= Tourism in Ukraine =

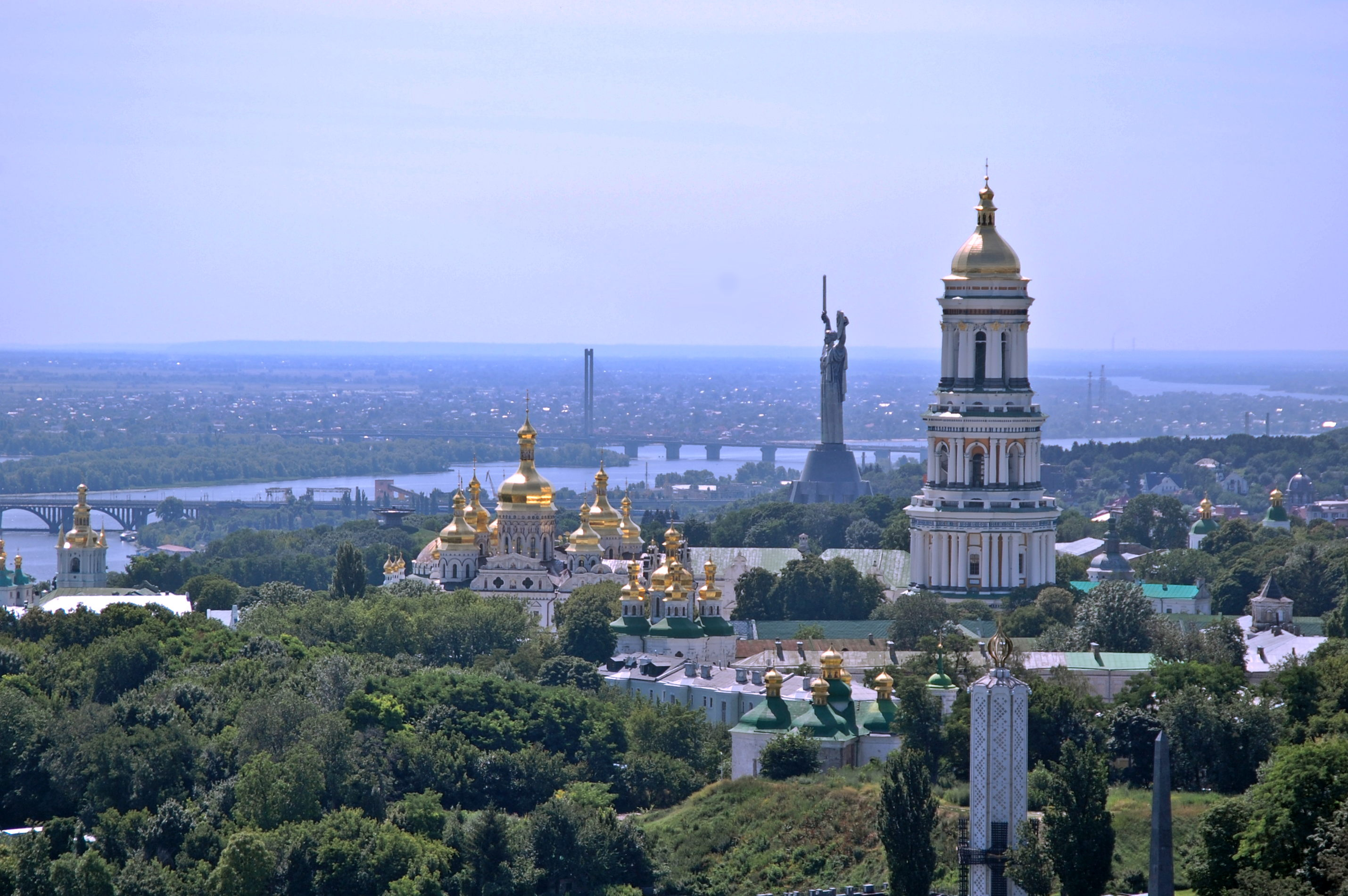
- Kyiv

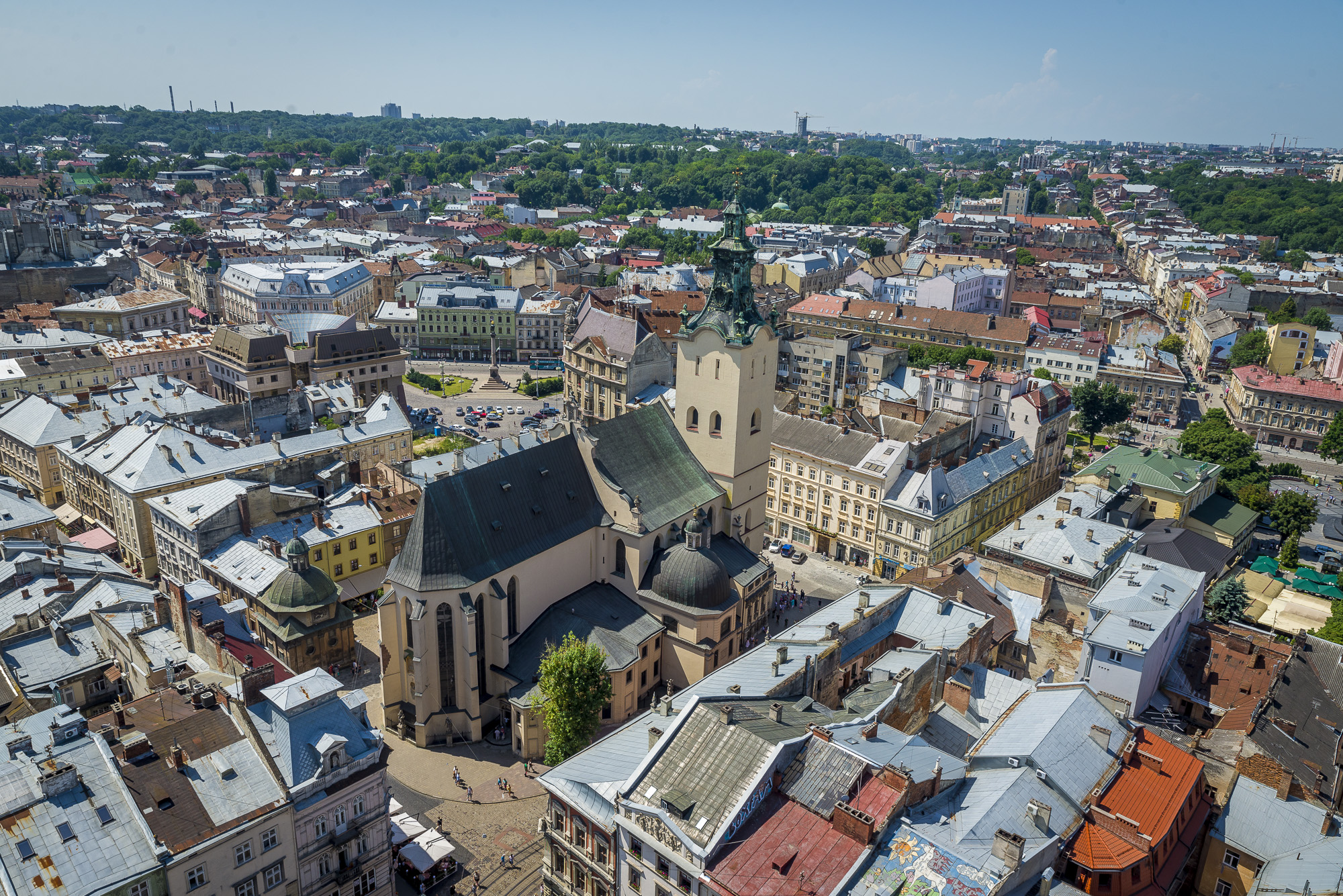
- Lviv

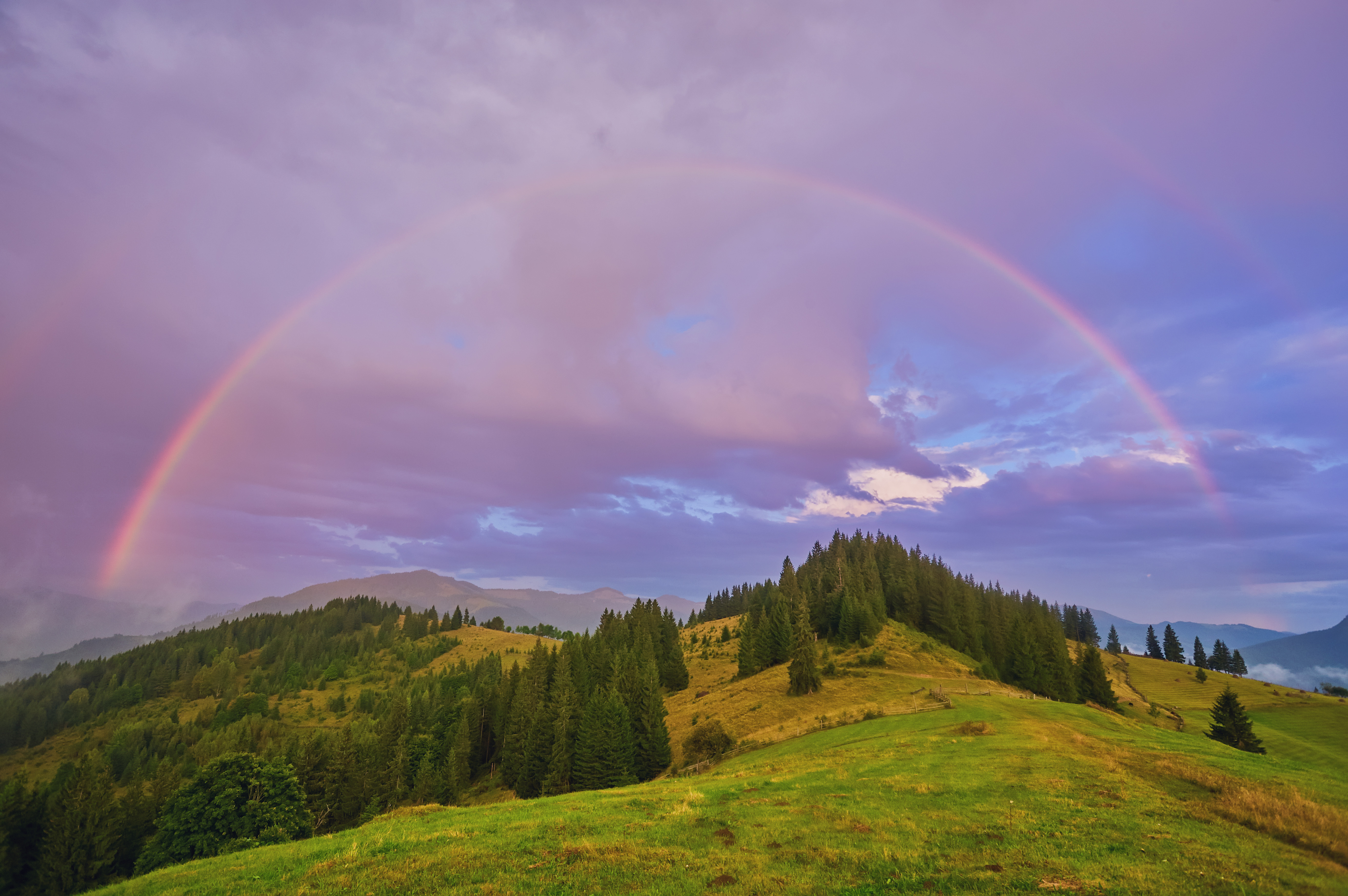
- A rainbow over the Carpathian Mountains

Tourism in Ukraine attracted more than 20 million foreign citizens every year before the 2014 Russian annexation of Crimea. Since 2014 this has halved. Visitors come from Europe, Turkey and Israel.

Ukraine offers tourists skiing, hiking, hunting, and fishing opportunities. There are nature reserves, historic churches and castles and other architectural treasures throughout the country. Kyiv, Lviv, Odesa and Kamyanets-Podilskyi are considered to be Ukraine's principal tourist centres. Other cities are less well known to tourists, such as Odesa.

The country's tourism industry is underdeveloped, but it does provide crucial support for Ukraine's economy. Since 2005 citizens of European Union and EFTA, United Kingdom, Canada, Japan and South Korea no longer require a visa to visit Ukraine for tourism purposes.

== Introduction ==
Tourism in Ukraine attracted more than 20 million foreign citizens every year before the 2014 Russian annexation of Crimea. Since 2014 this has lowered to about 10 million tourists. Visitors primarily come from Eastern Europe, but also from Western Europe, Turkey and Israel.

Before the Russo-Ukrainian War, Ukraine occupied 8th place in Europe by the number of tourists visiting, according to the World Tourism Organization rankings. Ukraine has numerous tourist attractions: mountain ranges suitable for skiing, hiking and fishing: the Black Sea coastline as a popular summer destination; nature reserves of different ecosystems; churches, castle ruins and other architectural and park landmarks; various outdoor activity points. Kyiv, Lviv, Odesa and Kamyanets-Podilskyi were Ukraine's principal tourist centres each offering many historical landmarks as well as formidable hospitality infrastructure. Tourism used to be the mainstay of Crimea's economy, but there was a major fall in visitor numbers following the Russian annexation in 2014.

The Seven Wonders of Ukraine and Seven Natural Wonders of Ukraine are the selection of the most important landmarks of Ukraine, chosen by the general public through an Internet-based vote.

Ukraine is a destination on the crossroads between central and eastern Europe, between north and south. It borders Russia and is not far from Turkey. It has mountain ranges – the Carpathian Mountains suitable for skiing, hiking, fishing and hunting. The coastline on the Black Sea is a popular summer destination for vacationers. Ukraine has vineyards where they produce native wines, ruins of ancient castles, historical parks, Orthodox, Catholic and Protestant churches as well as a few mosques and synagogues. Kyiv, the country's capital city has many unique structures such as Saint Sophia Cathedral and broad boulevards. There are other cities well known to tourists, such as the harbour town Odesa and the old city of Lviv in the west. Most of Western Ukraine, which used to be within the borders of the Republic of Poland before World War II, is a popular destination for Poles. Crimea, a little "continent" of its own, had been a popular vacation destination for tourists for swimming or sun tanning on the Black Sea with its warm climate, rugged mountains, plateaus and ancient ruins, though the tourist trade has been severely affected by Russia's occupation and annexation of the territory in 2014. Cities there include: Sevastopol and Yalta – location of the peace conference at the end of World War II. Visitors can also take cruise tours by ship on the Dnieper River from Kyiv to the Black Sea coastline. Ukrainian cuisine has a long history and offers a wide variety of original dishes.

The country's tourism industry is generally considered to be underdeveloped, but it does provide crucial support for Ukraine's economy. Ukraine does have certain advantages, including much lower costs than other European destinations, as well as visa-free access for most people from Europe, the former Soviet Union, and North America. Since 2005 citizens of European Union and EFTA, United States, Canada, Japan and South Korea no longer require a visa to visit Ukraine for tourism purposes. Additionally, no visa is required from most countries of the former Soviet Union with the exceptions of Russia and Turkmenistan.

Top 10 countries whose residents provided the most visits to Ukraine (2016)
| Country | Number |
|---|---|
| Moldova | 4.3 million |
| Belarus | 1.8 million |
| Russia | 1.5 million |
| Hungary | 1.3 million |
| Poland | 1.2 million |
| Romania | 0.8 million |
| Slovakia | 0.4 million |
| Israel | 0.2 million |
| Turkey | 0.2 million |
| Germany | 0.2 million |

== Popular tourist city destinations ==
=== Central Ukraine ===
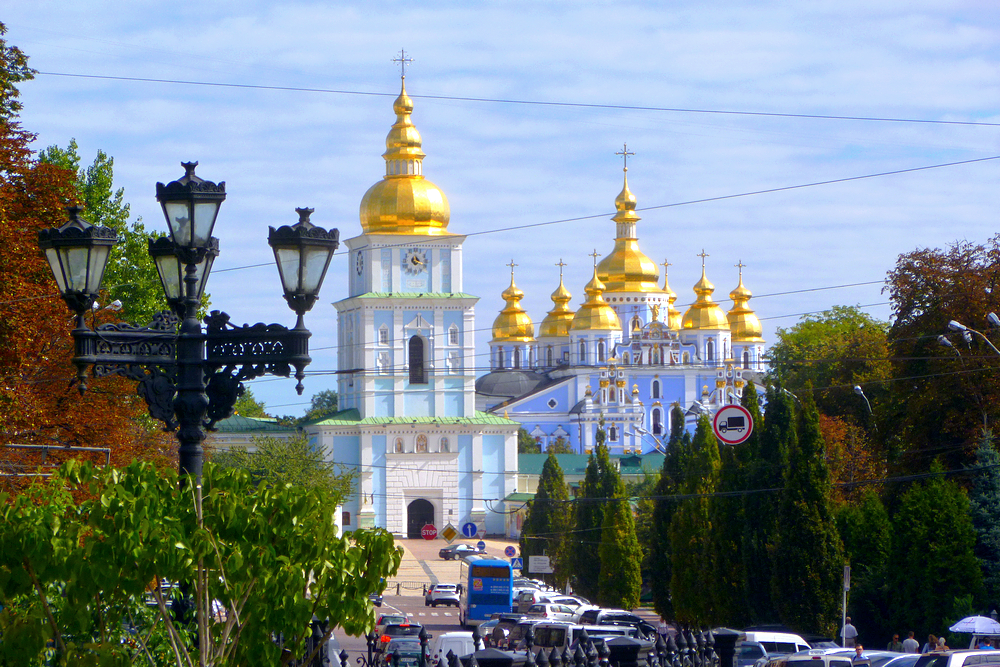
St. Michael's Golden-Domed Monastery in Kyiv.

Main cities

- Kyiv – the historical capital of Kievan Rus' and modern Ukraine on the Dnieper River. Ancient churches, broad boulevards, beautiful landscapes and a variety of cultural facilities make it a popular destination.
- Chernihiv – ancient city of Kievan Rus', one of the oldest cities in Ukraine, has lots of Medieval architecture. Some of the oldest human settlements in Europe have also been discovered in the area.
- Pereiaslav – "living museum", one of the biggest historic and ethnographic reserves in Ukraine. There are over 20 different museums, and the city hosts various exhibitions and fairs.
- Vinnytsia – the largest city in the historic region of Podillia. Houses the largest floating fountain in Europe, built on the Southern Bug River near Festyvalnyi Isle.
- Sumy – city's history started in the mid-17th century.
- Uman – known for its arboretum and being the site of Rosh Hashana kibbutz.
- Poltava – a common destination for culinary and cultural tourism.
- Novhorod-Siverskyi – historic city known for its churches.
- Chyhyryn and Baturyn – former capitals of the Cossack Hetmanate with sites of the Cossack era.
- Kropyvnytskyi - known for the fortress of St. Elizabeth - one of the few earthen forts from the XVIII century that have survived in Europe, and an architectural heritage in the style of neoclassicism.

=== Western Ukraine ===
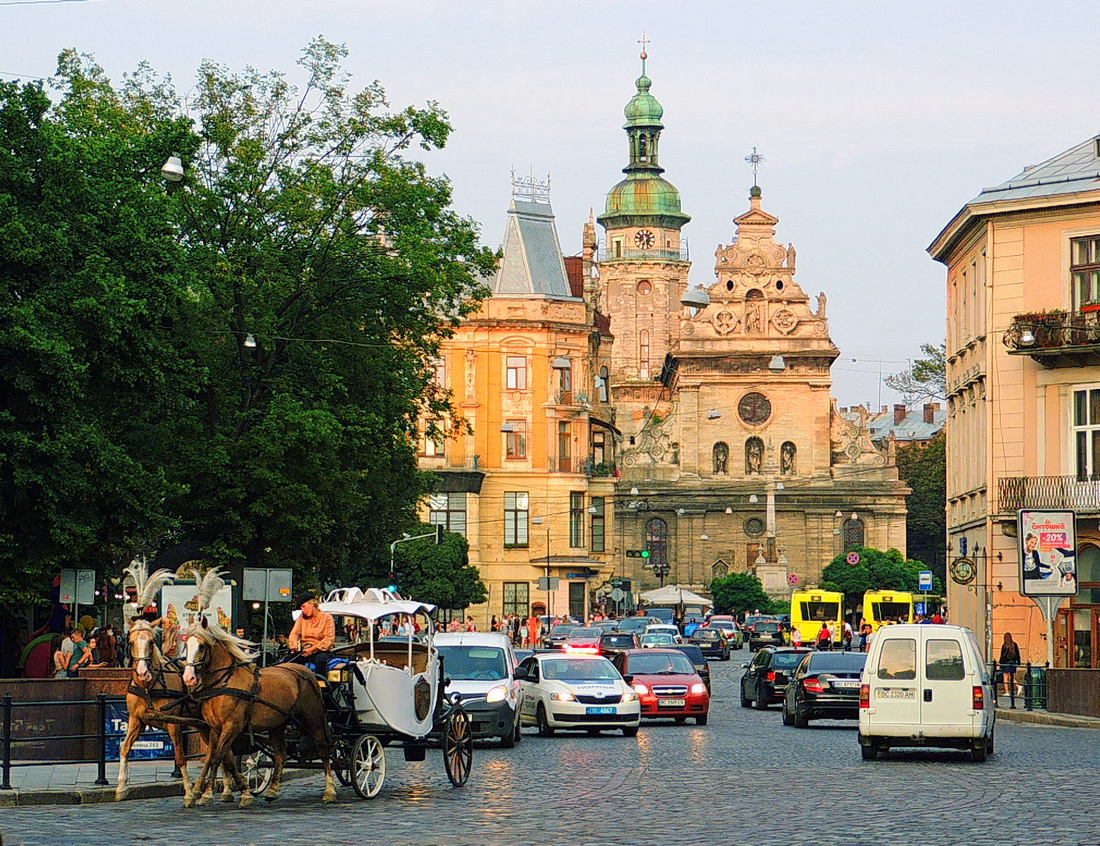
The Bernardine church and monastery in Lviv

- Lviv – old city in the west of country, with its medieval old town and unique architecture with Polish and Austrian influences. The top tourist destination in Ukraine, when it comes to architecture and culture.
- Ivano-Frankivsk – western Ukrainian city that was recognized as the best city to live in Ukraine.
- Chernivtsi – the capital of Bukovina offers Balkan atmosphere and fine classical Habsburg architecture in Central-European style, as it was part of Austrian empire (prior to 1918).
- Uzhhorod – the capital of Transcarpathia, one of the oldest cities in Ukraine. It attracts tourists because of its proximity to the Carpathian Mountains.
- Mukachevo – a major city of Transcarpathia, especially known for its castle.
- Kamianets-Podilskyi – a historic city surrounded by the Smotrych River canyon. It is well known for its castle.
- Ternopil – a historic city known for its pond.
- Lutsk – the post-Mongol capital of Volhynia, known for its castle.
- Drohobych – known for its historic centre and the wooden church.
- Halych – the Rus'-era capital of Galicia which migrated to the north and developed into a new city from 14th century, forming a historic complex with neighboring villages.
- Khotyn – known for its 13th–17th century fortress, the city is a common stop on the Chernivtsi–Kamianets-Podilskyi tourist route.
- Pochaiv and Kremenets – neighboring historic cities the sites of which are united under one national historic and architectural reserve. The highlights are Pochaiv Lavra and Saint Ignatius Church accordingly.
- Golden Horseshoe of Lviv Oblast – a tourist route which includes various castles in Lviv Oblast, such as Olesko, Pidhirtsi, Zolochiv, Svirzh, and sometimes also Zhovkva, Pomoriany, and Stare Selo castles.

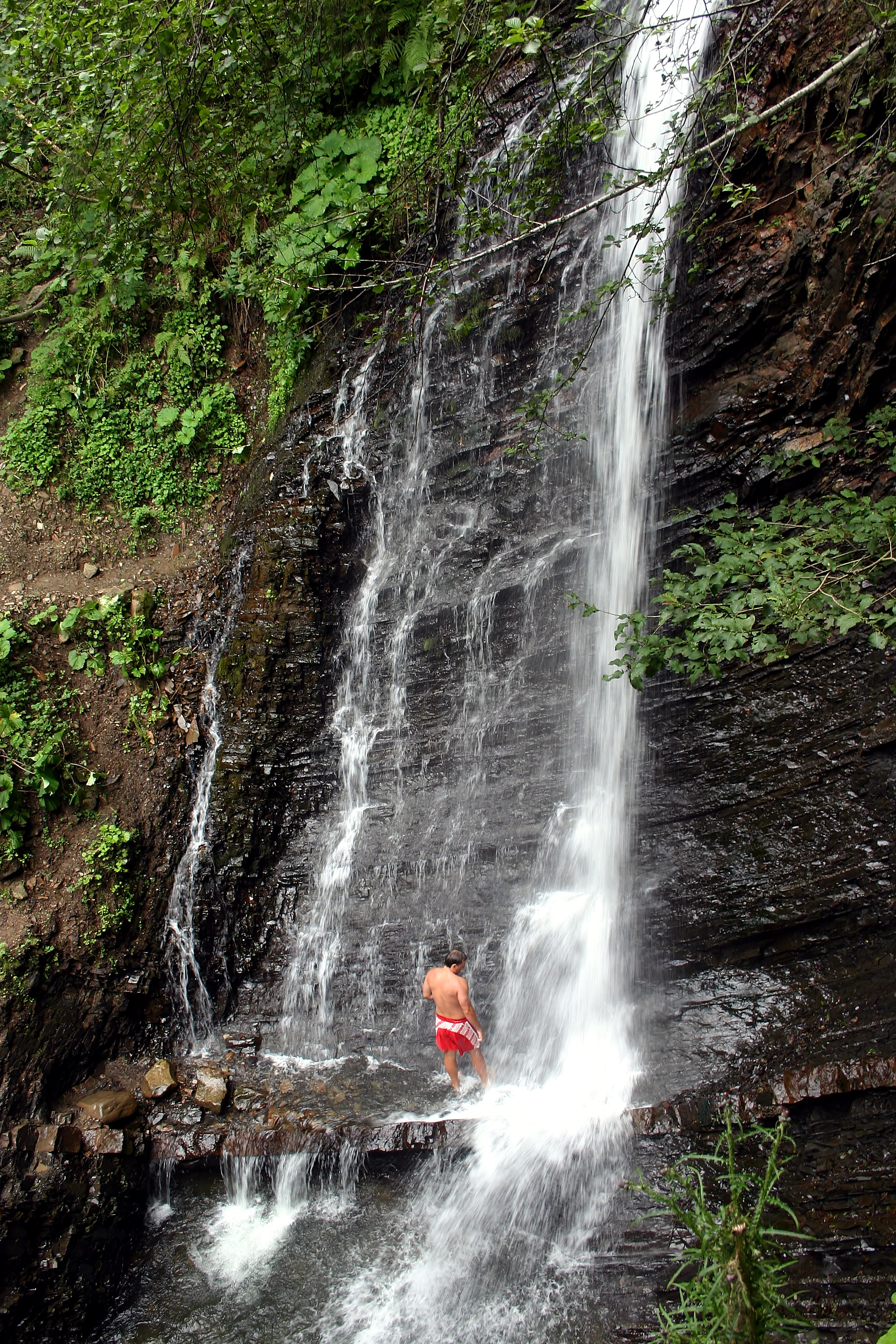
Waterfall Zhenets in Ivano-Frankivsk Oblast

=== Eastern Ukraine ===
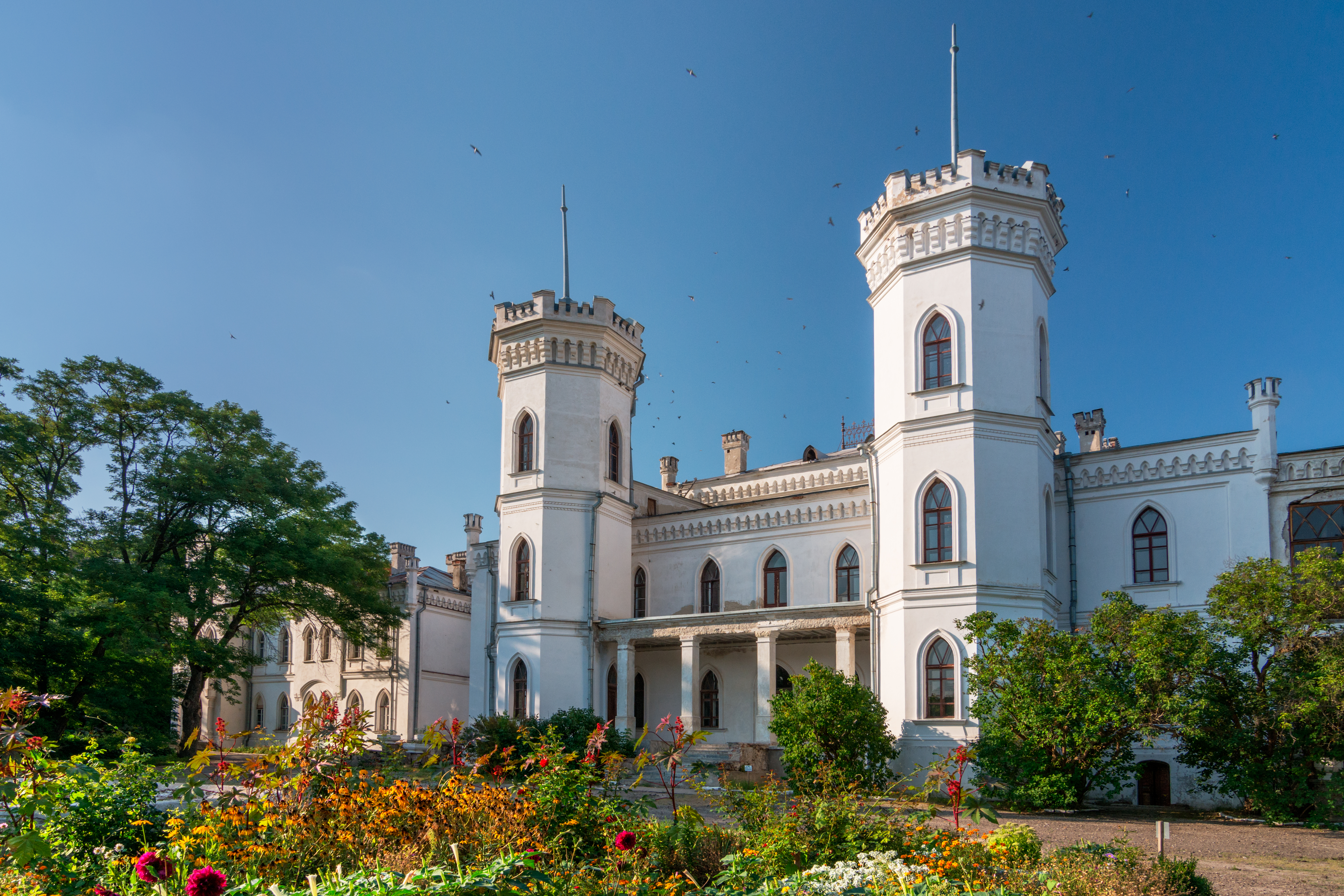
Sharivka Manor, Bohodukhiv Raion Kharkiv Oblast

- Kharkiv – city's history started in the mid-17th century, when the Cossacks created the Sloboda settlements; and since then, the city has turned into one of the largest commercial, cultural and educational centers in Ukraine with a population of over 1.7 million people. From December 1919 to June 1934, Kharkiv was the capital of Soviet Ukraine, with Derzhprom being the highlight of the era. The Ukrainian cultural renaissance commenced here in the years 1920–1930.
- Sviatohirsk – known for its monastery on hills.
- Bakhmut – site of multiple historic buildings until their destruction during the Battle of Bakhmut.
- Donetsk
- Luhansk

=== Southern Ukraine ===
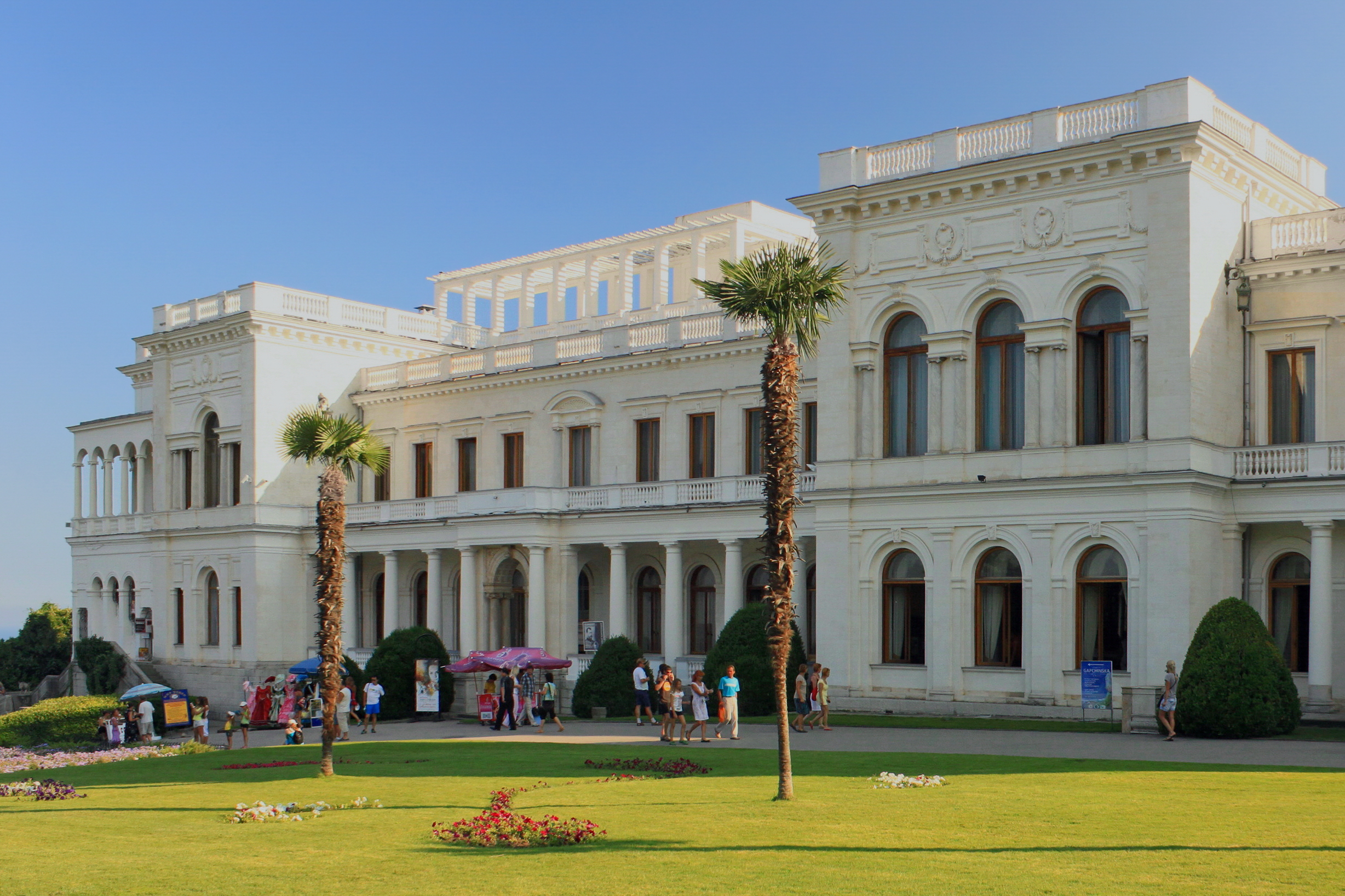
Livadia Palace in Yalta (Crimean Southern Coast)

- Odesa – a harbor city on the Black Sea with a mixture of different cultures, including Jewish, Armenian, German, Russian and Greek cultures along with the native Ukrainian culture. Odesa is a Black Sea resort and the largest trading center of Ukraine.
- Zaporizhzhia – the sixth largest city in Ukraine, famous for Khortytsia Island, DniproHES and Sotsmisto (Socialist city) neighborhood.
- Dnipro – the fourth largest city in Ukraine.
- Izmail – a historic town on the Danube River in Odesa Oblast of south-western Ukraine.
- Bilhorod-Dnistrovskyi – one of the oldest cities in Ukraine, dating back to the ancient Greek colony of Tyras.
- Sevastopol – a port city known for the ruins of Chersonesos Taurica, an ancient Greek settlement (currently under administration of the Russian Federation).
- Bakhchysarai – the traditional capital of Crimean Tatars, known for its palace and cave town (currently under administration of the Russian Federation).
- Kerch – among the oldest cities in Ukraine, with buildings and structures of ancient Greek, Byzantine, Ottoman, Imperial Russian, and Soviet eras (currently under administration of the Russian Federation).
- Crimean Southern Coast (Crimean Riviera) – the coastline of Yalta and Alushta municipalities which covers many resort towns, especially known for the nature and palaces (currently under administration of the Russian Federation).

== Landscapes ==
- Carpathian Mountains – impressive mountain landscapes with skiing and hiking possibilities, spas with cold and hot springs. Ski resorts include Bukovel, Slavsko, Verkhovyna, Vorokhta.
- Hoverla – the highest mountain in Ukraine. Hiking.
- Azov coast – bathing resorts.
- Dnieper – cruises.
- Dniester – canoeing, boat sailing.
- Southern Bug – rafting, ecotourism.
- Shatsk Lakes – bathing, camping, hiking.
- Sofiyivka Park, located in Uman.
- Waterfalls of Ukraine – ecotourism.
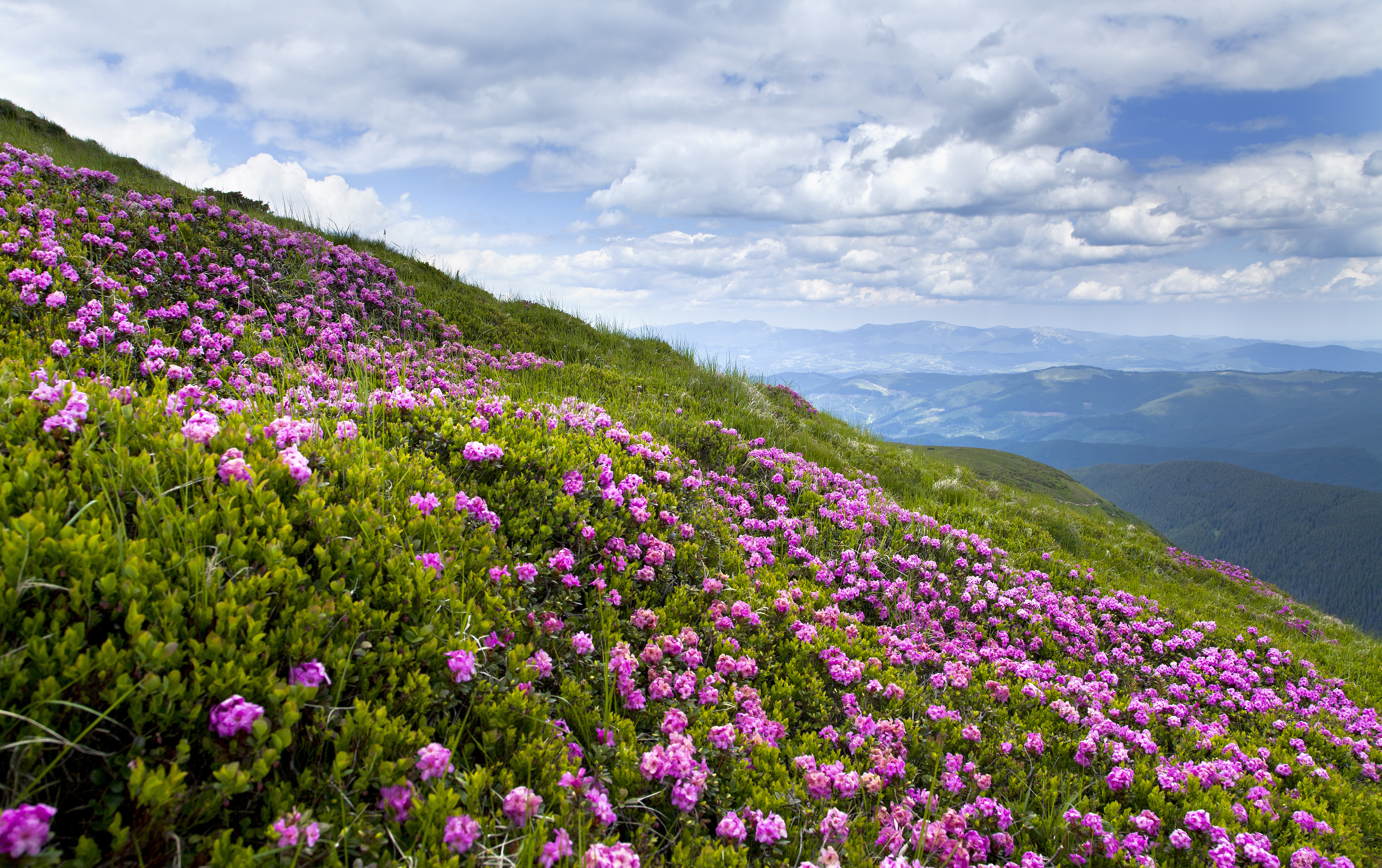
The rhododendrons at the Chornohora valley

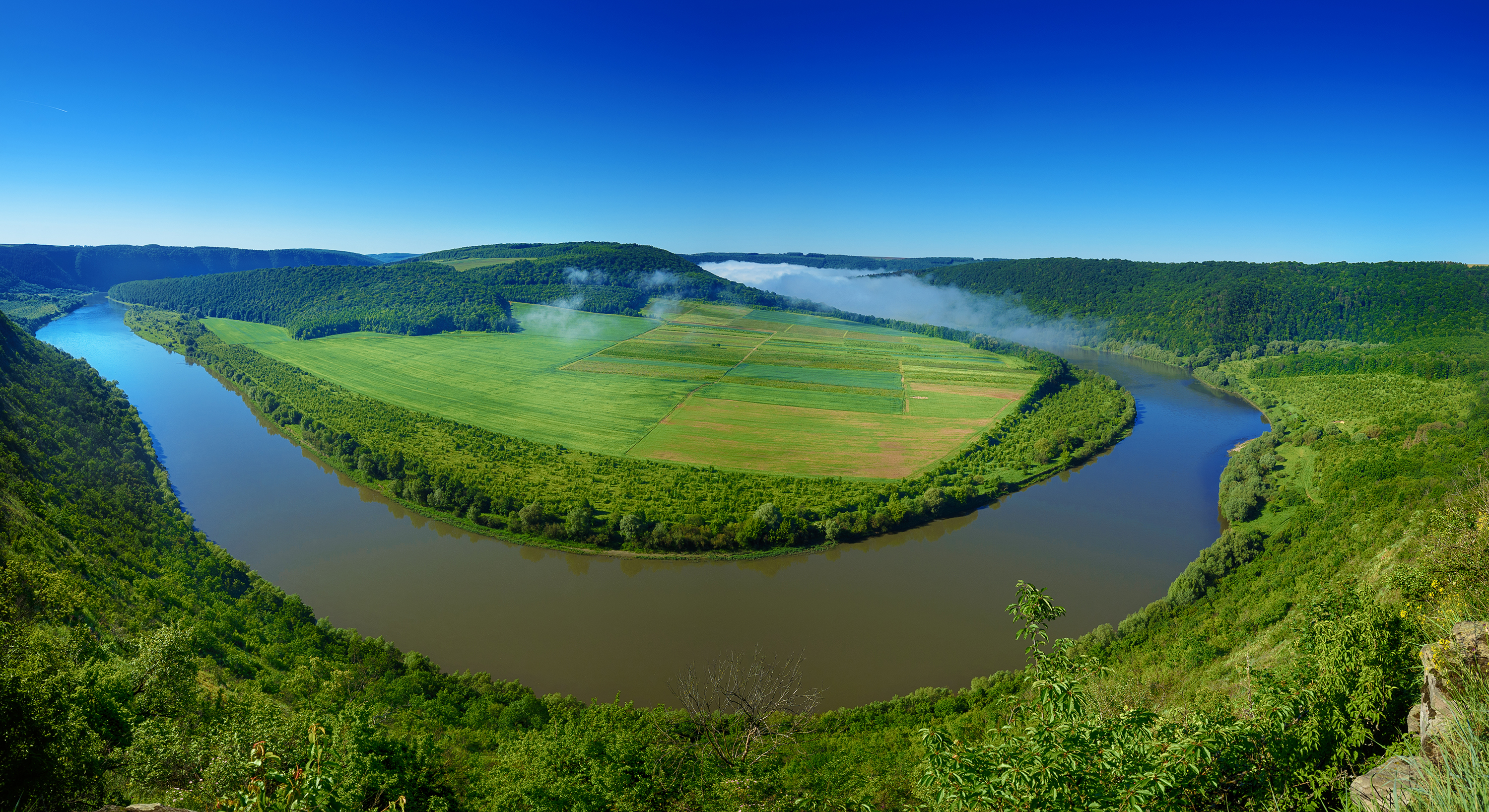
Dniester Canyon National Nature Park near Chervona mountain

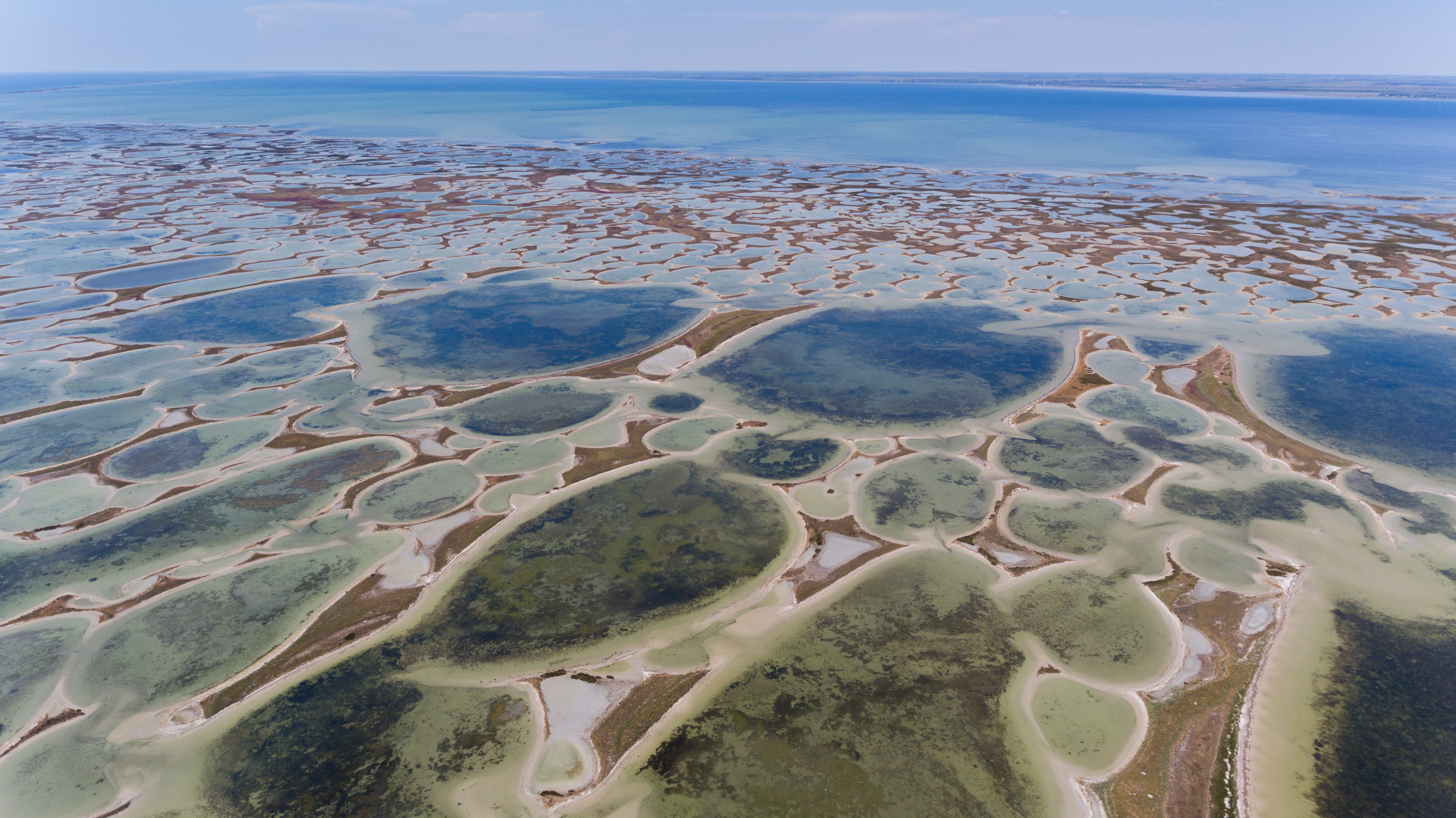
Dzharylhach National Nature Park, Kherson Oblast

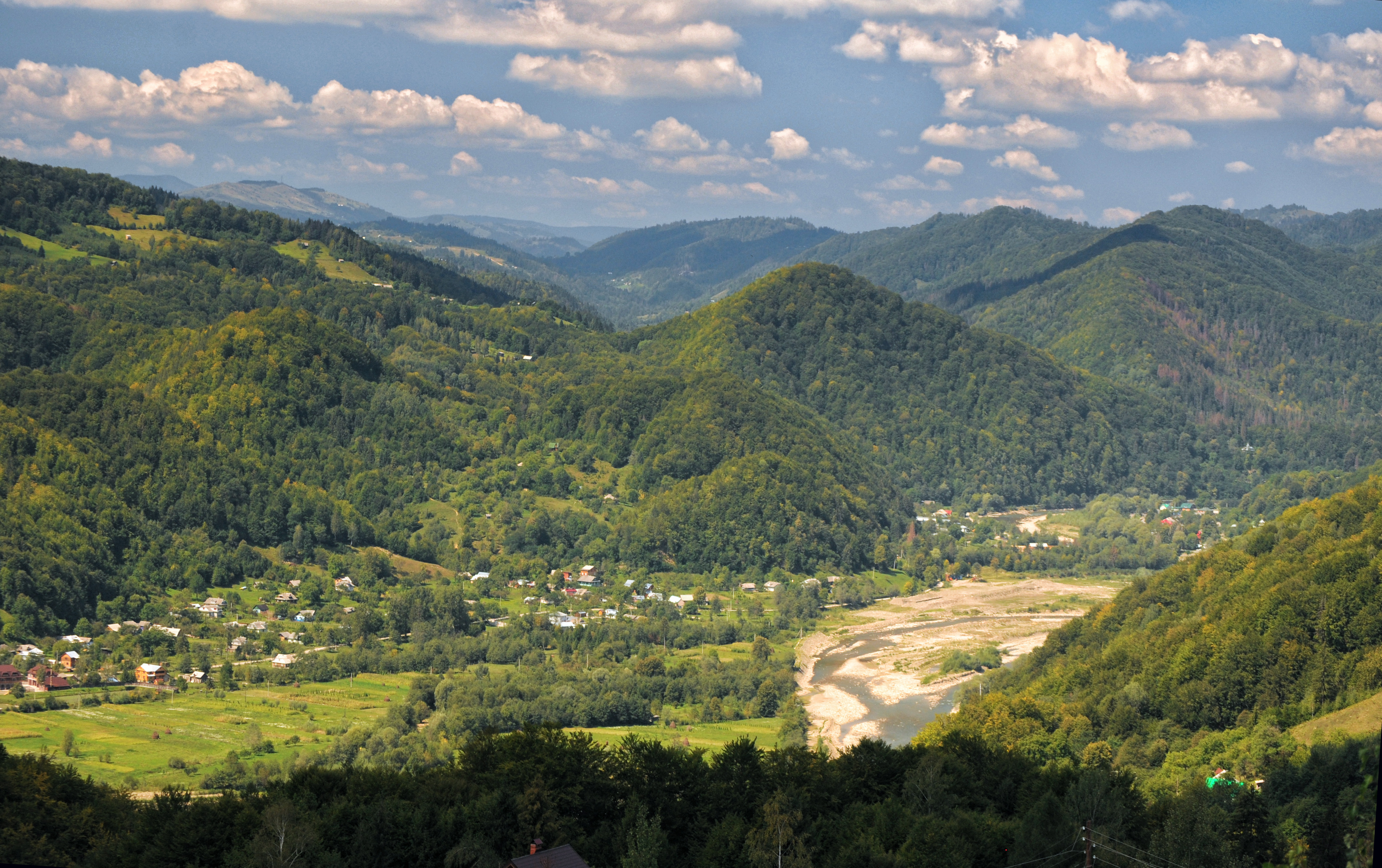
Village in Ivano-Frankivsk Oblast

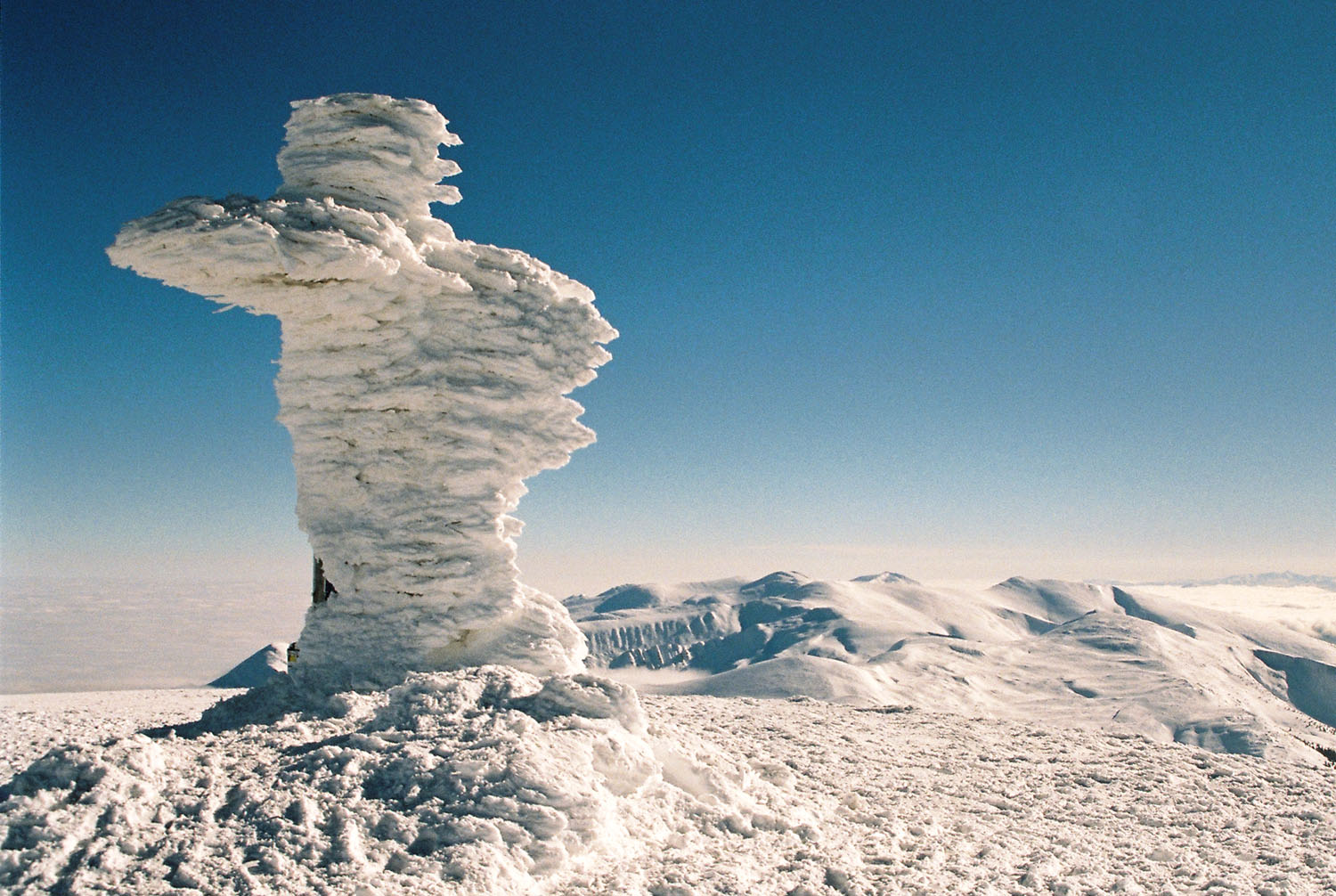
At the top of Hoverla in winter

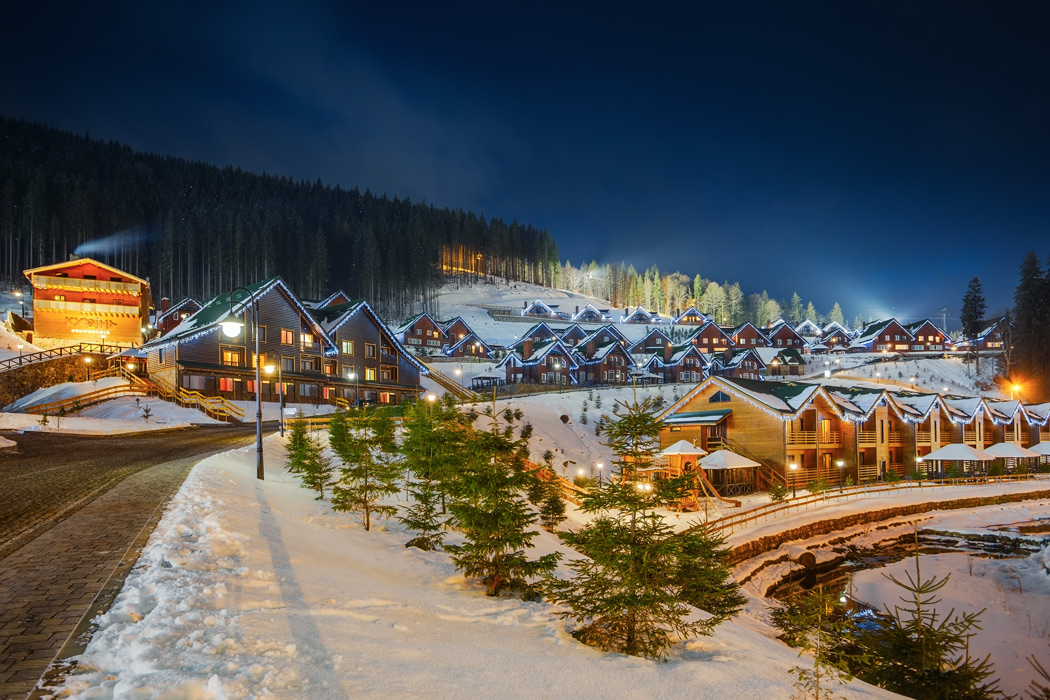
Bukovel, the largest ski resort in Eastern Europe and Ukraine

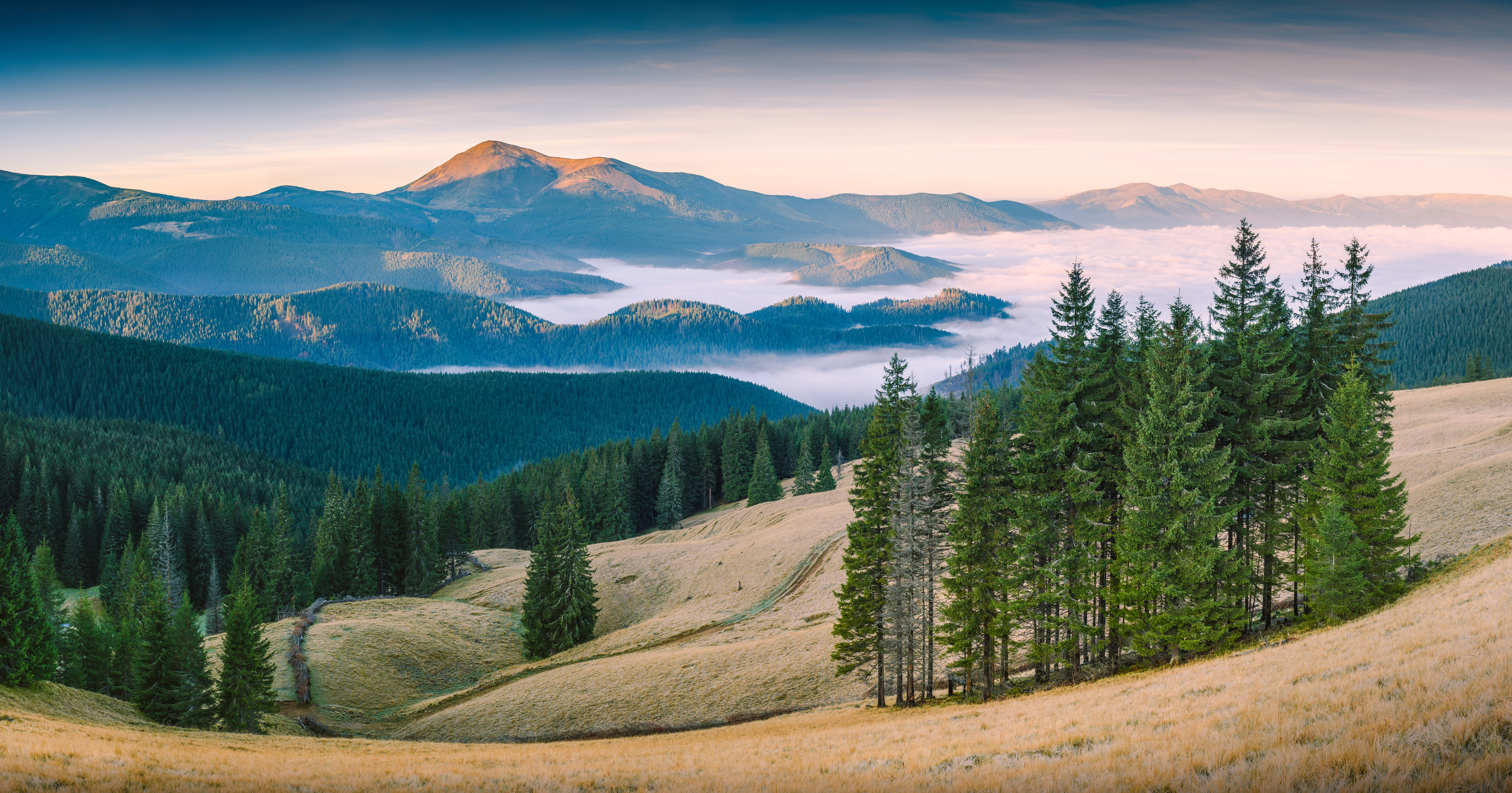
Carpathian Biosphere Reserve in Zakarpattia Oblast

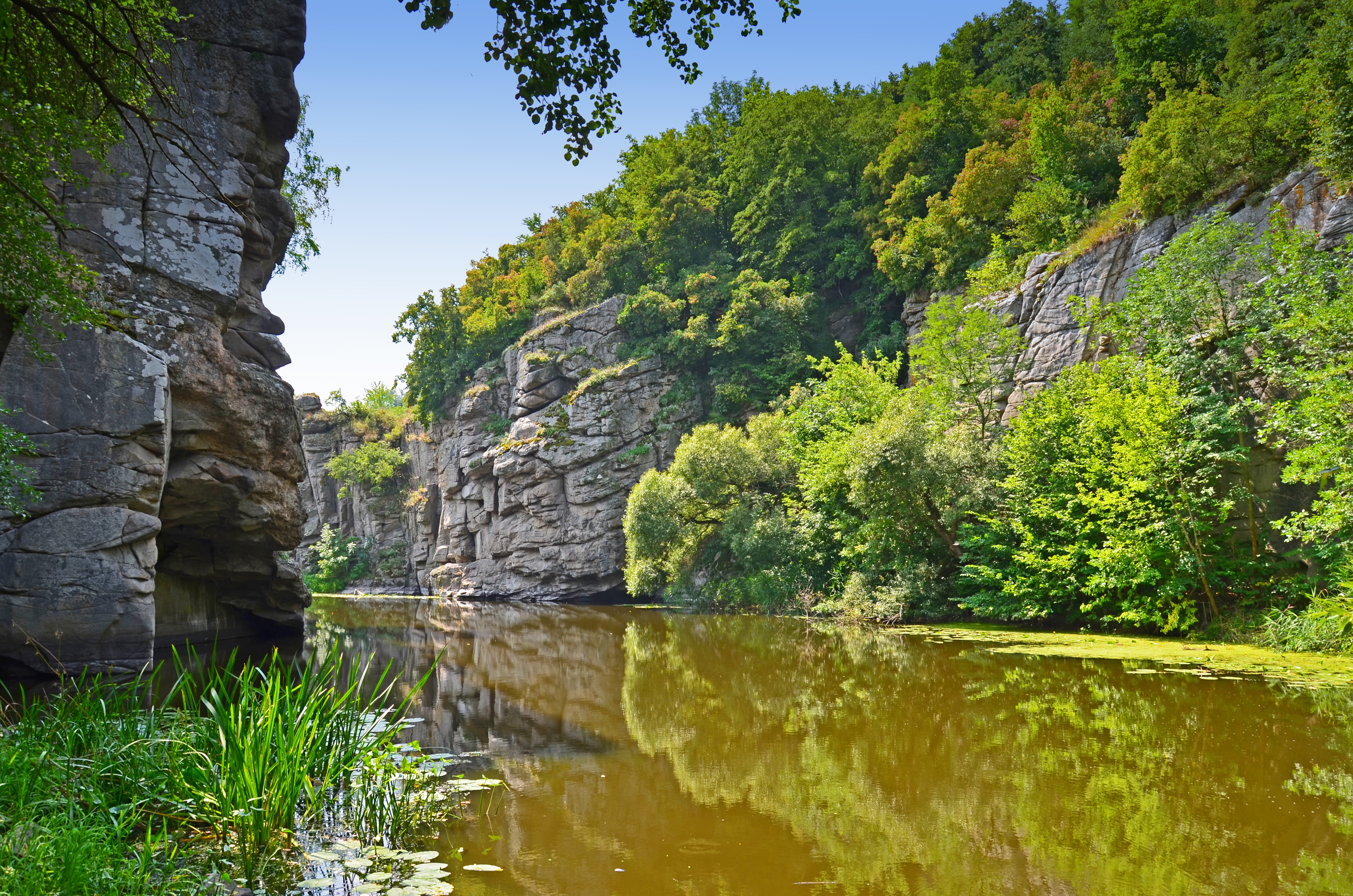
Buky Canyon in the Cherkasy Oblast

=== Seven Wonders of Ukraine ===
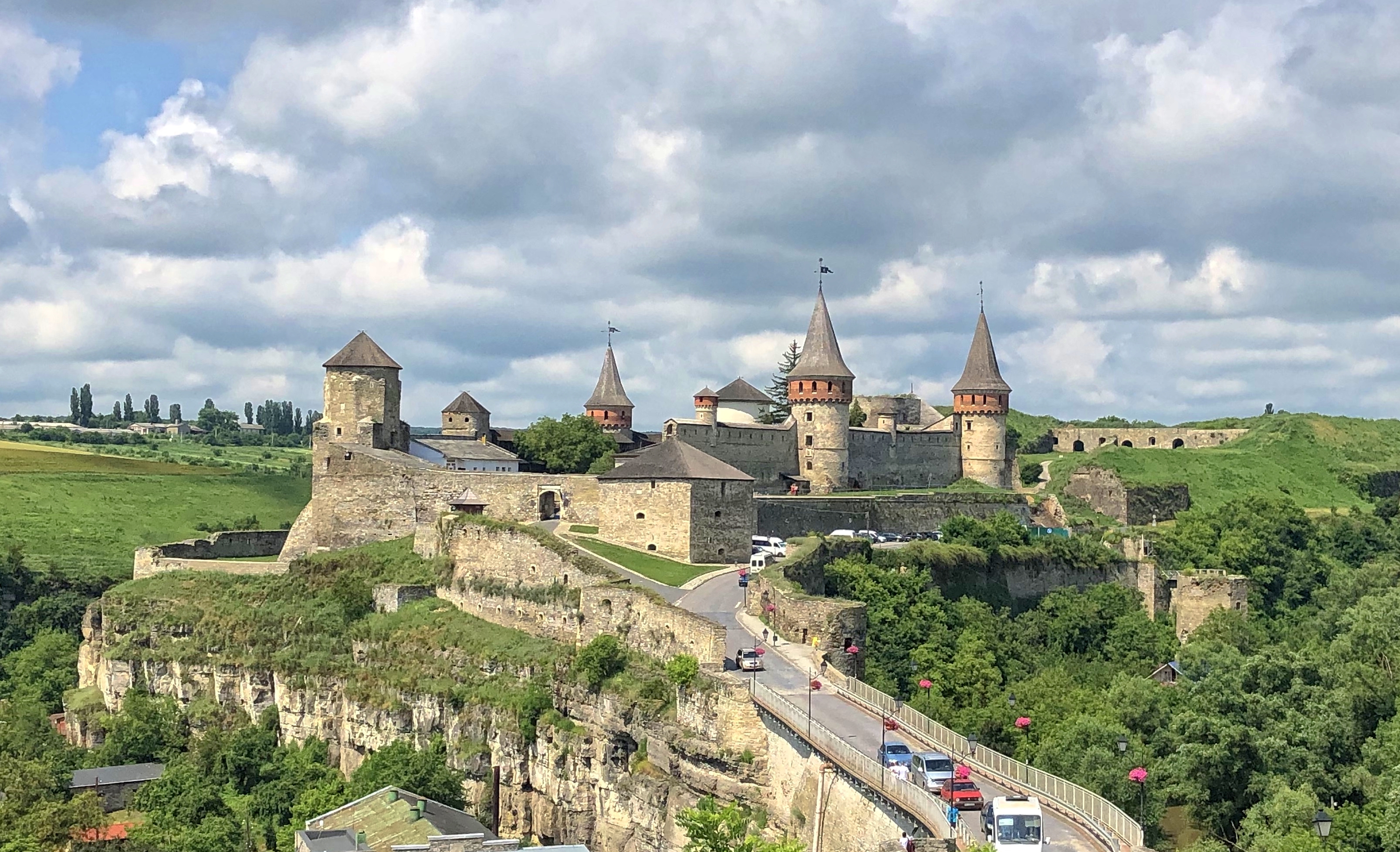
Kamianets-Podilskyi Castle, 2019

The Seven Wonders of Ukraine are the seven historical and cultural monuments of Ukraine, which were chosen in the Seven Wonders of Ukraine contest held in July 2007.

- Sofiyivka Park in Uman, Cherkasy Oblast
- Kyiv Pechersk Lavra (Monastery of the Caves)
- Kamianets-Podilskyi Historical Complex in Kamianets-Podilskyi, Khmelnytskyi Oblast
- Khortytsia in Zaporizhzhia, Zaporizhzhia Oblast
- Chersonesus in Sevastopol
- Saint Sophia Cathedral, Kyiv
- Khotyn Fortress in Khotyn, Chernivtsi Oblast

=== Seven natural wonders of Ukraine ===
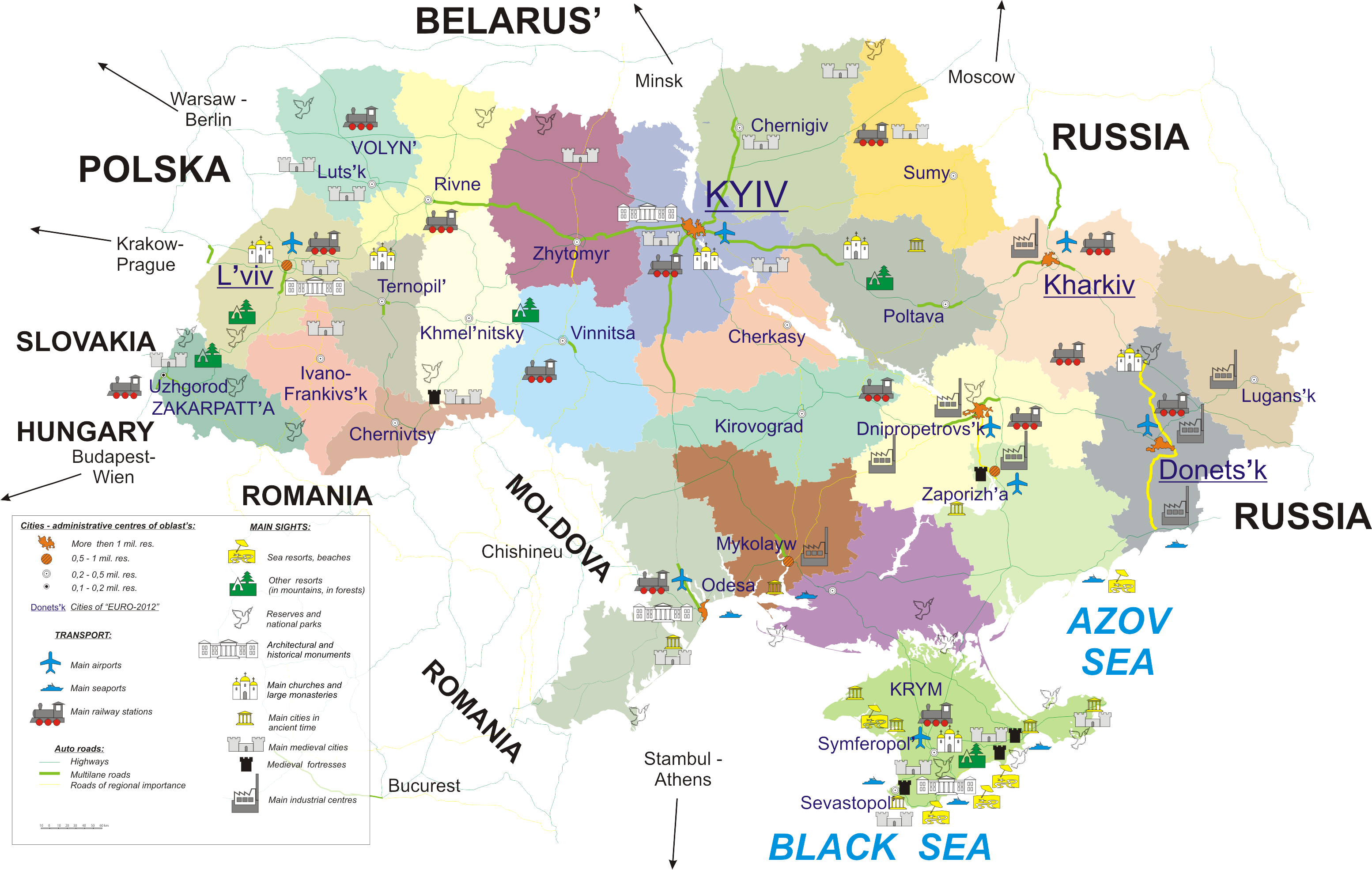
Tourism in Ukraine

Winners of all Ukraine competition Seven natural wonders of Ukraine:

- Askania-Nova near Askania-Nova, Kherson Oblast
- Granite-steppe lands of Buh in Mykolaiv Oblast
- Dniester Canyon, Dnister
- Marble Cave (Crimea)
- Podillian Tovtry in Khmelnytskyi Oblast
- Lake Svitiaz, part of a group of lakes near Shatsk, Volyn Oblast
- Lake Synevyr near village of Synevyrska Poliana in Carpathian Mountains

=== Recognized World Heritage sites ===
- Kyiv: Saint Sophia Cathedral and Related Monastic Buildings, Kyiv Pechersk Lavra
- L'viv – the Ensemble of the Historic Centre (Old Town, Pidzamche and St. George's Cathedral)
- Residence of Bukovinian and Dalmatian Metropolitans in Chernivtsi
- Ancient City of Tauric Chersonese and its Chora in Sevastopol
- Segments of the Struve Geodetic Arc (at Staro-Nekrasivka, Baranivka, Felshtyn, and Katerynivka)
- Ancient and Primeval Beech Forests in Ukrainian Carpathians, Roztochchia and Satanivska Dacha.
- Wooden tserkvas of the Carpathian Region
- The Historic Centre of Odesa

== Medical tourism ==
Lately many modern dental clinics with high quality dentistry equipment and high quality materials have been established in Ukraine. They provide patients with high quality dentistry services for prices much cheaper in comparison with Western and Russian clinics. Many tourists from United States, European Union and Russia arrive for dental services, providing a sort of dental tourism.

Other popular sorts of medical tourism in Ukraine are spas, eye and plastic surgery, hair transplants, and mud baths.

Truskavets and Myrhorod are well known for their mineral springs.

== Religious tourism ==
Uman is a pilgrimage site for Breslov Hasidic Jews, especially on Rosh Hashana kibbutz.

Saint Sophia Cathedral and Kyiv Pechersk Lavra in Kyiv are sites of Eastern Orthodox pilgrimage.

== Events ==
=== Festival culture ===
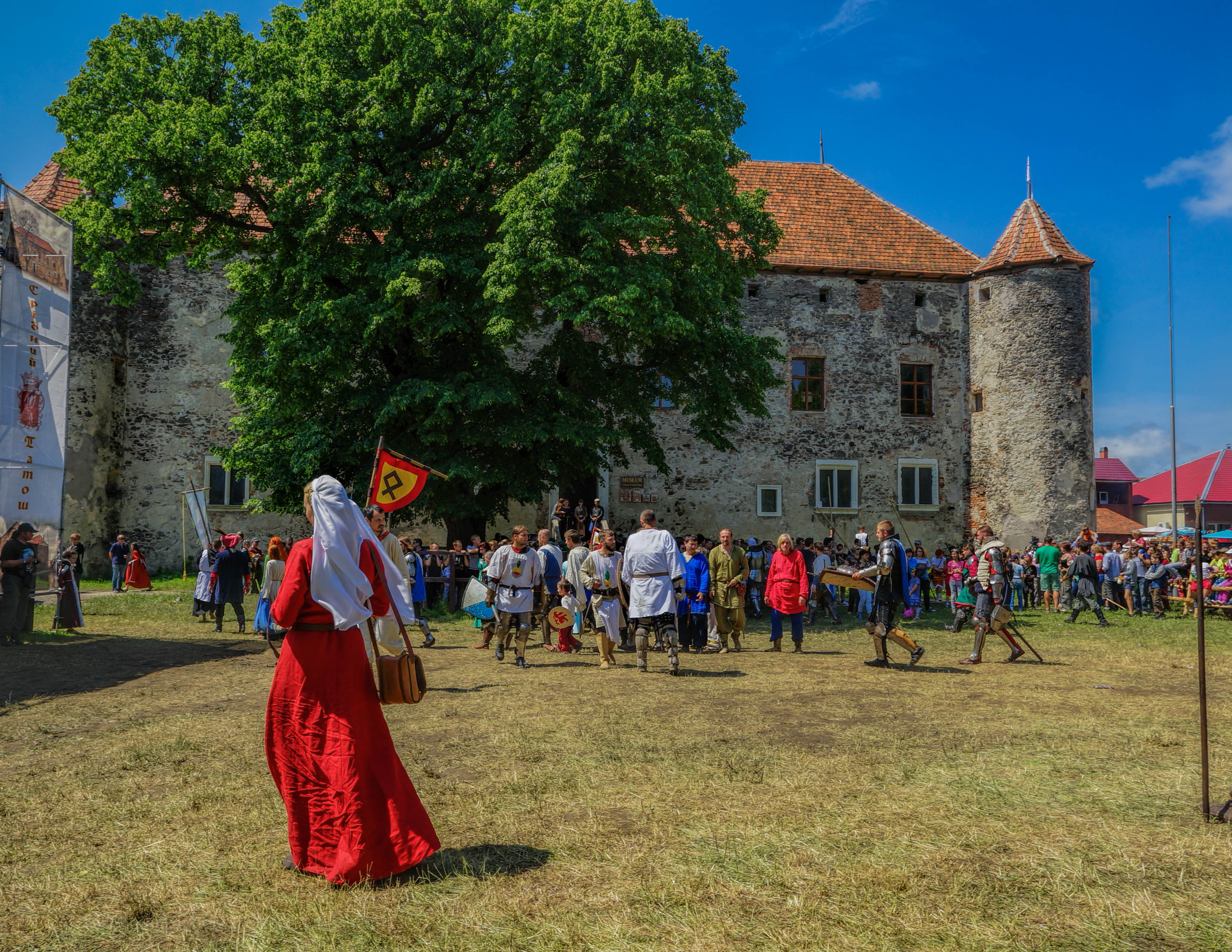
Thousands of tourists visit the festival of medieval culture "Silver Tatosh" in the castle of Saint-Miklos, Chynadiiovo, Zakarpattia Oblast

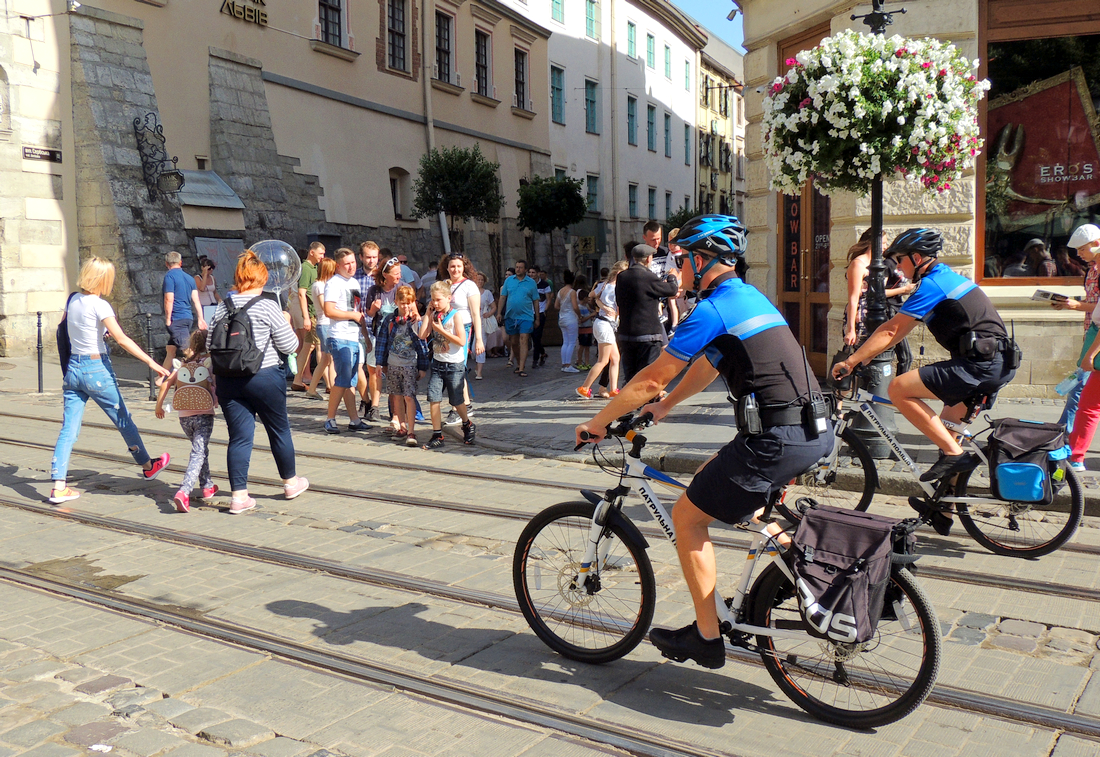
Police patrol by bicycles in the tourist area of Lviv

In recent years a variety of festivals emerged in major Ukrainian cities. Among the most popular are international jazz festival in Lviv, street food festival in Kyiv, various summer festivals in Odesa—a popular tourist destination in summer. Many of these festivals take place in former industrial buildings of the Soviet era and are thus helping to rejuvenate these areas.

| Type | Event | Location | Season | Notes |
|---|---|---|---|---|
| Film festival | Molodist International Film Festival | Kyiv | April | |
| Film festival | Kyiv International Short Film Festival | Kyiv | April | |
| Film festival | Odesa International Film Festival | Odesa | Second half of July | |
| Food festival | Borshch-yiv | Borshchiv | September | |
| Food festival | Deruny Festival | Korosten | September | |
| Food festival | Lviv Cheese and Wine Festival | Lviv | October | |
| Humor festival | Humorina | Odesa | April | |
| Arts festival | Gogolfest | Kyiv | September | |
| Music festival | Zaxidfest | Rodatychi, Lviv Oblast | Middle of August | |
| Music festival | Fajne Misto | Ternopil | July | |
| Music festival | Leopolis Jazz Fest | Lviv | June | |
| Music festival | Atlas Festival | Kyiv | June | |
| Music festival | Kyiv Music Fest | Kyiv | Late September to early October | |
| Music festival | Koktebel Jazz Festival | Koktebel (before 2014) Zatoka and Bilhorod-Dnistrovskyi (after 2014) | Middle of September | |
| Music festival | Kraina Mriy | various | January | |
| Poetry festival | Meridian Czernowitz | Chernivtsi | September | |
| Sports festival | Hot Air Balloon Festival | Kamianets-Podilskyi | May | |
| Sports festival | Leopolis Grand Prix | Lviv | June | |
| Cultural festival | Forpost Fest | Kamianets-Podilskyi | August | |
| Cultural festival | Book Forum Lviv | Lviv | September | |
| Cultural festival | Etnovyr | Lviv | August | |
| Cultural festival | Koliada na Maizliakh | Ivano-Frankivsk | January | |

=== Trade fairs ===
| City | Trade fair | Industry | Notes |
|---|---|---|---|
| Kyiv | AGRO | Agriculture | |
| Lviv | The Lviv Publishers’ Forum | Books | |
| Kyiv | Metal-Forum of Ukraine | Metal branch | |
| Velyki Sorochyntsi | Sorochyntsi Fair | Cuisine | |
| Kyiv | Jeweller Expo Ukraine | Jewellery | |
| Kyiv | Kyiv Fashion | Clothes and style | |
| Kyiv | Upakovka | Packaging industry | |
| Kyiv | Arms and Security | Weapons | |

== Governing body of tourist industry and its chairs ==
- Main Directorate of Foreign Tourism (at the Government of the Ukrainian SSR and part of the Soviet Goskominturist)
  - 1964–74 Yosyp Zatyahan
  - 1974–89 Viktor Dobrotvor
- Ukrintur Association
  - 1989–93 Volodymyr Skrynnyk
- State Committee of Ukraine on tourism
  - 1993–96 Volodymyr Skrynnyk
  - 1997–98 Anatoliy Kasianenko
  - 1998–2000 Valeriy Tsybukh
- State Department of Tourism (State Committee of Youth Policy, Sport and Tourism)
  - 2001–02 Anatoliy Matviyenko
- State Tourist Administration of Ukraine
  - 2002–05 Valeriy Tsybukh
- State Service of Tourism and Resorts (Ministry of Culture and Tourism)
  - 2005–06 Ihor Prystavskyi
  - 2006–10 Anatoliy Pakhlya
- State Agency of Ukraine on Tourism and Resorts (Ministry of Infrastructure)
  - 2011–14 Olena Shapovalova
- Department (Directorate) of Tourism and Resorts (Ministry of Economic Development and Trade)
  - 2016–17 Ivan Liptuha
  - 2018–2019 Oksana Serdyuk
- State Agency for Tourism Development of Ukraine (Ministry of Culture and Information Policy of Ukraine)
  - 2019–present Mariana Oleskiv

== Foreign travel statistics ==
Most visitors arriving in Ukraine were from the following countries of nationality:

| Country | 2017 | 2016 | 2015 | 2014 | 2013 |
|---|---|---|---|---|---|
| Moldova | ▲4,435,664 | ▼4,296,409 | ▲4,393,528 | ▼4,368,355 | 5,417,966 |
| Belarus | ▲2,727,645 | ▼1,822,261 | ▲1,891,518 | ▼1,592,935 | 3,353,652 |
| Russia | ▼1,464,764 | ▲1,473,633 | ▼1,231,035 | ▼2,362,982 | 10,284,782 |
| Poland | ▲1,144,249 | ▲1,195,163 | ▲1,156,011 | ▼1,123,945 | 1,259,209 |
| Hungary | ▼1,058,970 | ▲1,269,653 | ▲1,070,035 | ▲874,184 | 771,038 |
| Romania | ▲791,116 | ▲774,585 | ▲763,228 | ▼584,774 | 877,234 |
| Slovakia | ▼366,249 | ▼410,508 | ▼412,519 | ▼416,158 | 424,306 |
| Turkey | ▲270,695 | ▲199,618 | ▲140,691 | ▼116,302 | 151,706 |
| Israel | ▲261,486 | ▲216,638 | ▲149,386 | ▼101,799 | 120,913 |
| Germany | ▲209,447 | ▲171,118 | ▲154,498 | ▼131,244 | 253,318 |
| Other countries | ▼1,499,357 | ▲1,503,510 | ▲1,065,837 | ▼1,038,829 | 1,757,103 |
| Total | ▲14,229,642 | ▲13,333,096 | ▼12,428,286 | ▼12,711,507 | 24,671,227 |

Number of foreign citizens visiting Ukraine (from 2014, excluding Crimea)

Statistics are based on data from the State Statistics Agency of Ukraine.

- 2000: 6.4 million
- 2001: 9.2 million
- 2002: 10.5 million
- 2003: 12.5 million
- 2004: 15.6 million
- 2005: 17.6 million
- 2006: 18.9 million
- 2007: 23.1 million
- 2008: 25.4 million
- 2009: 20.8 million
- 2010: 21.2 million
- 2011: 21.4 million
- 2012: 23.0 million
- 2013: 24.7 million
- 2014: 12.7 million
- 2015: 12.4 million
- 2016: 13.3 million
- 2017: 14.2 million

== Gallery ==
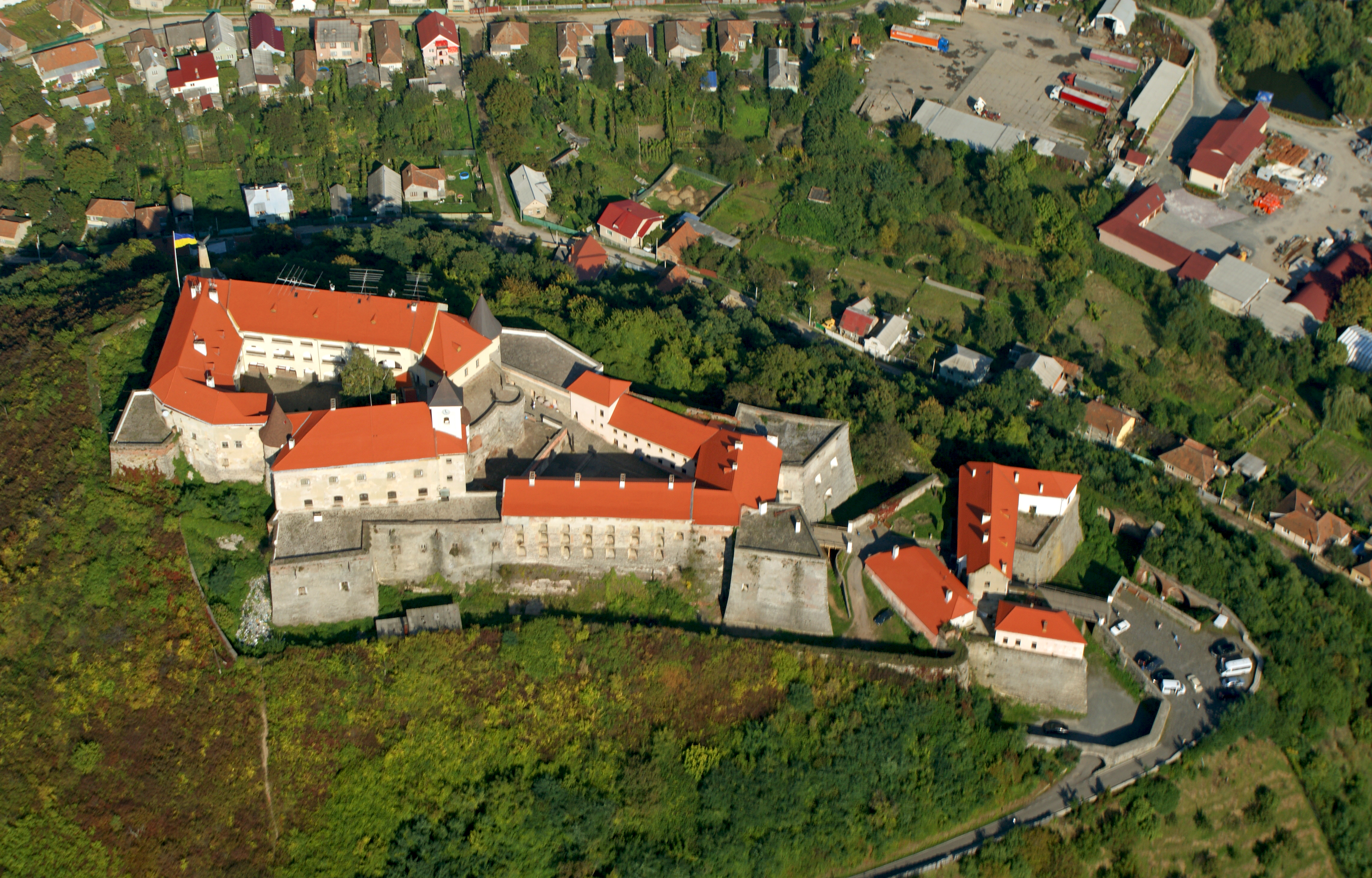
Palanok Castle in Mukachevo

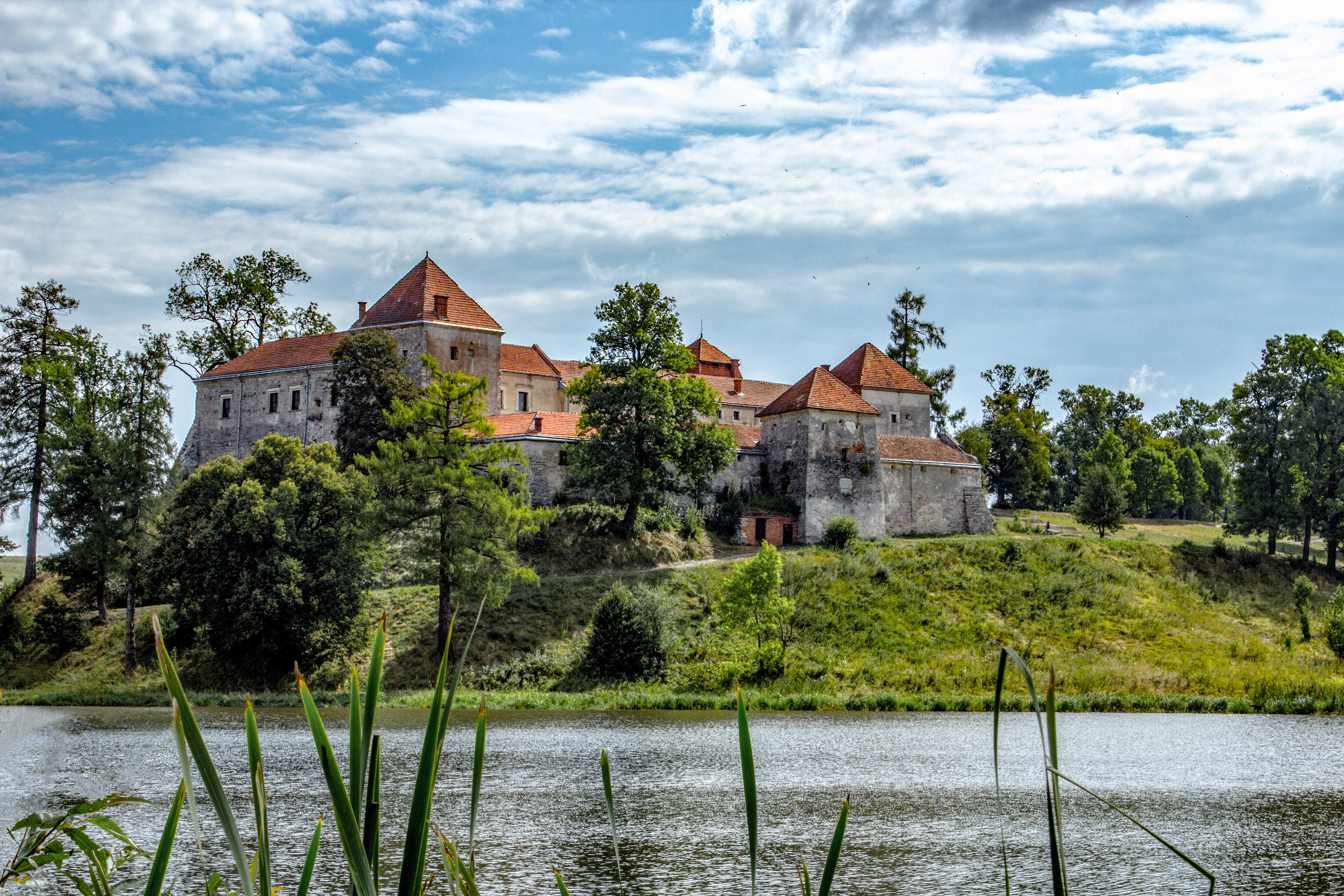
Svirzh Castle in Lviv Oblast

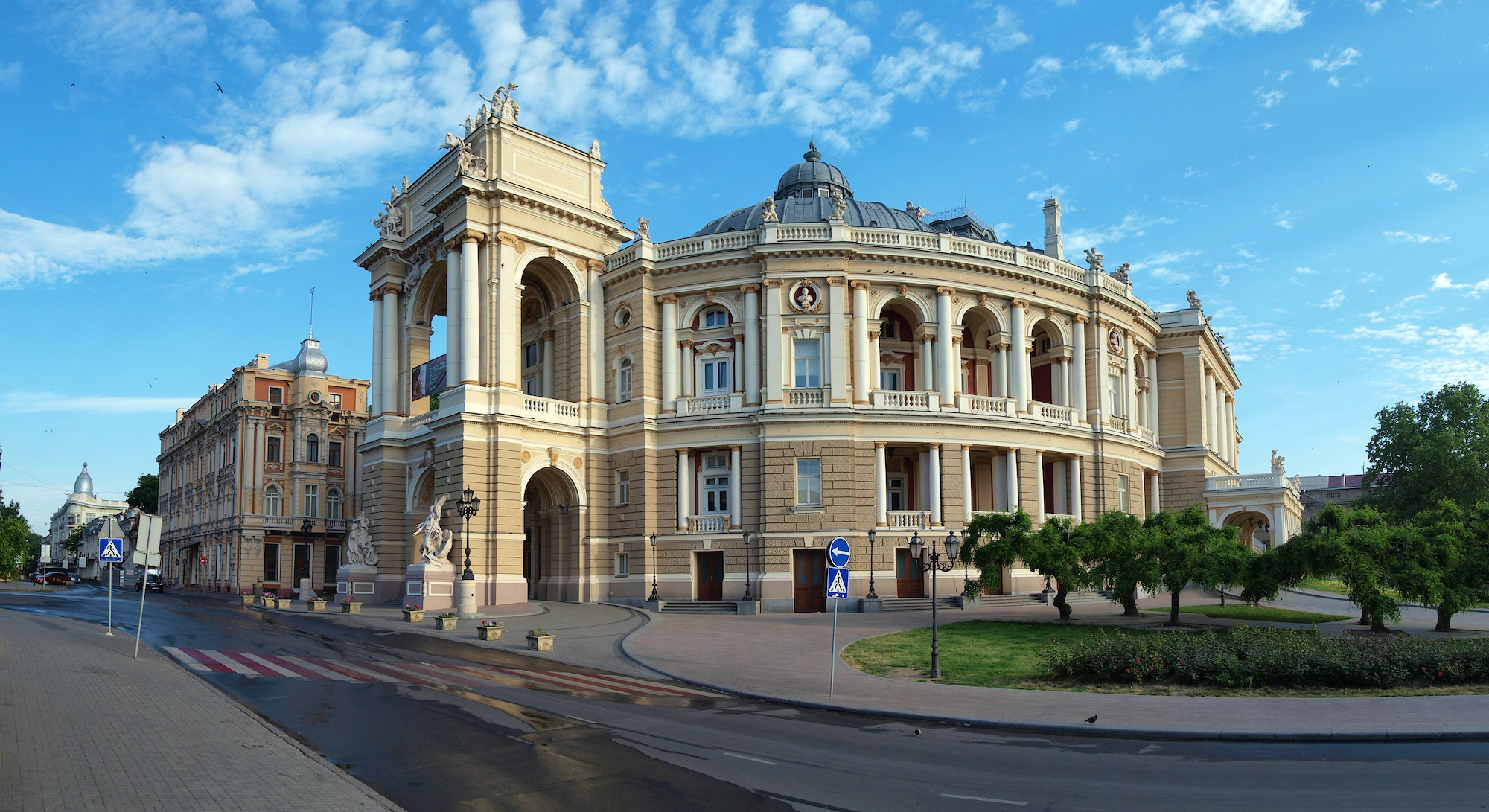
The famous Odesa Opera and Ballet Theater

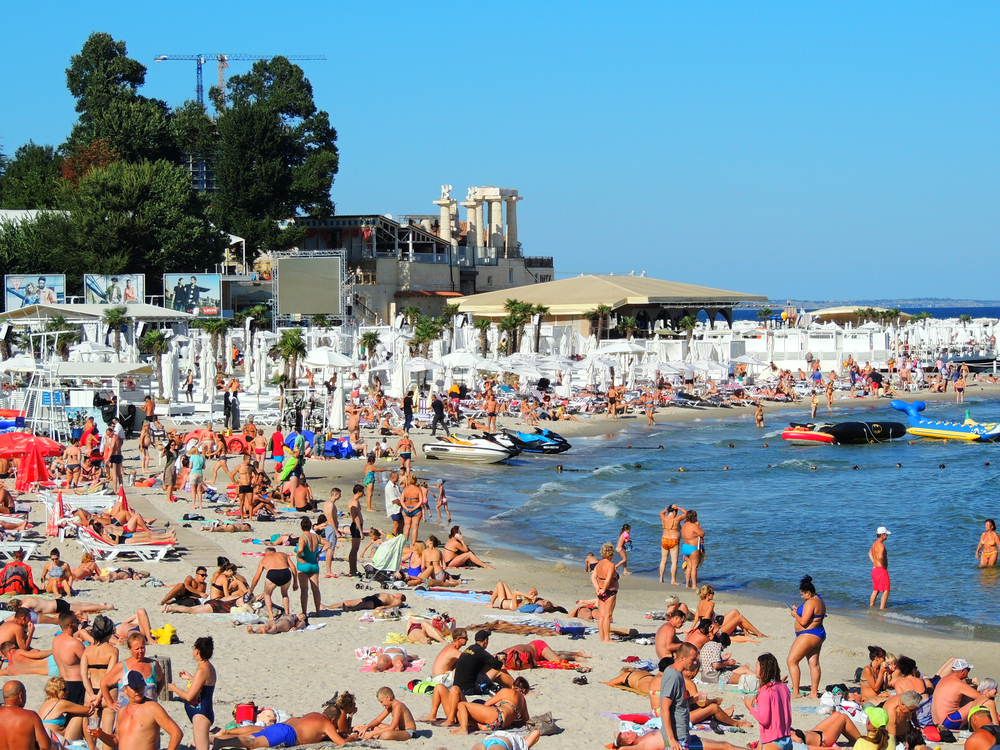
Arcadia Beach in Odesa

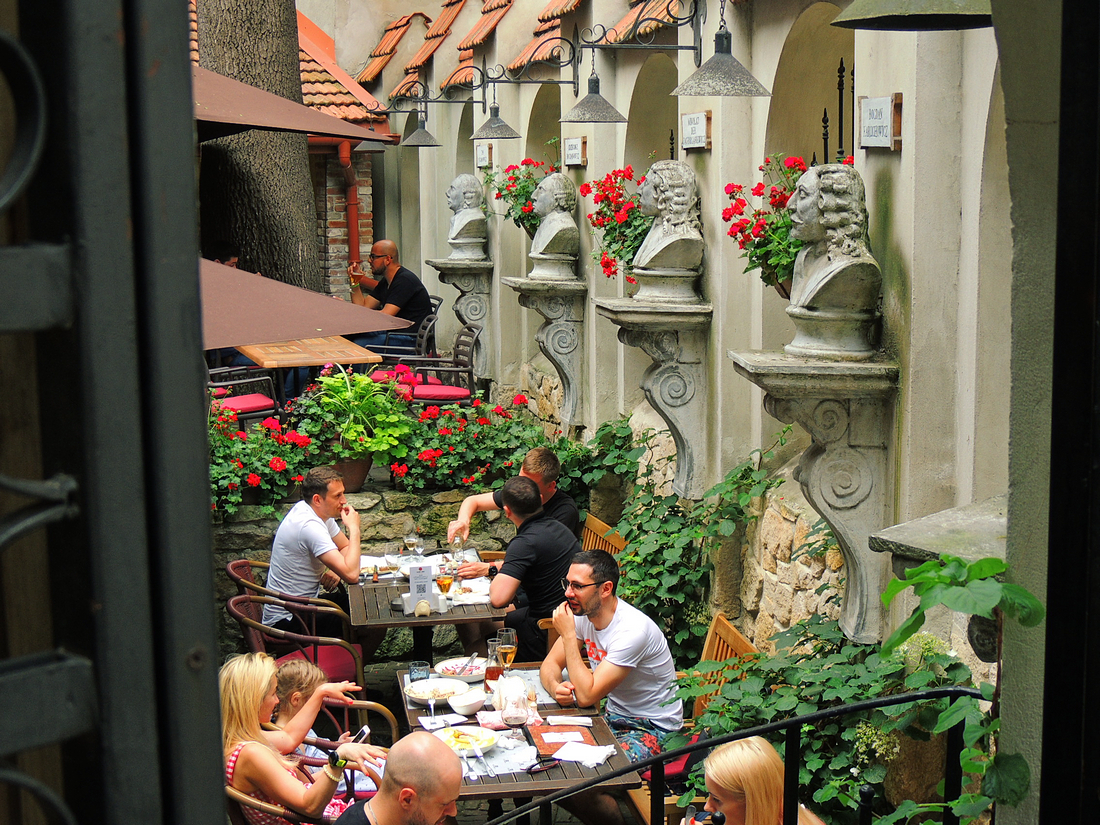
Restaurants in Ukraine are very affordable for foreign tourists.

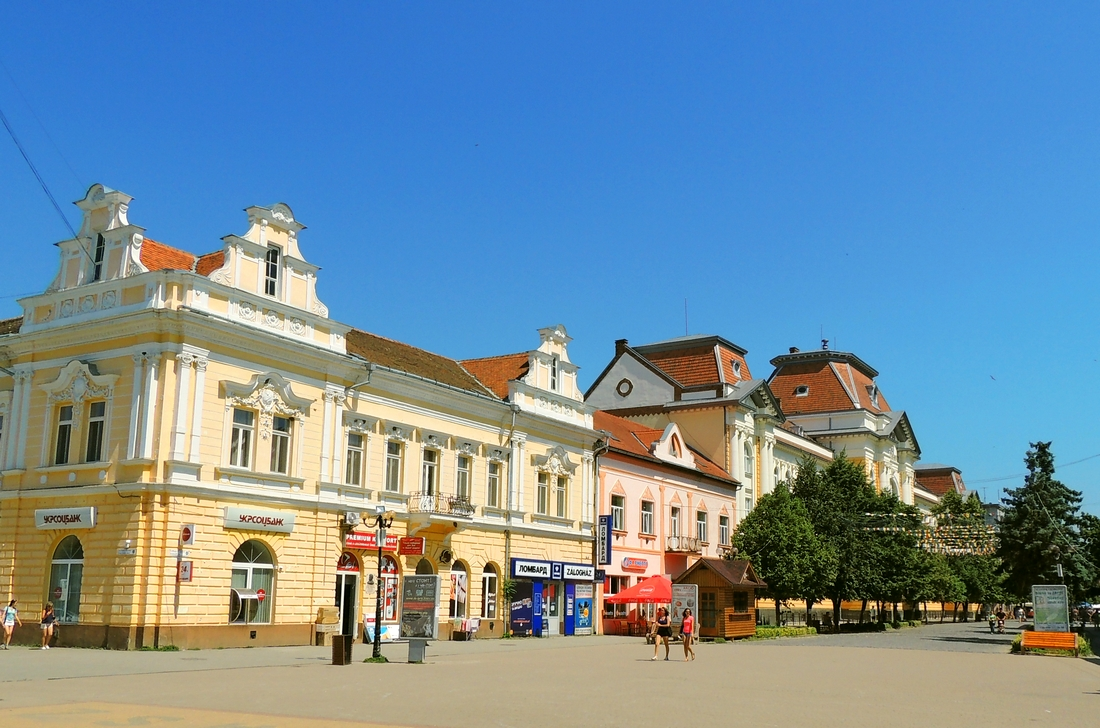
Berehove, a small town in Western Ukraine

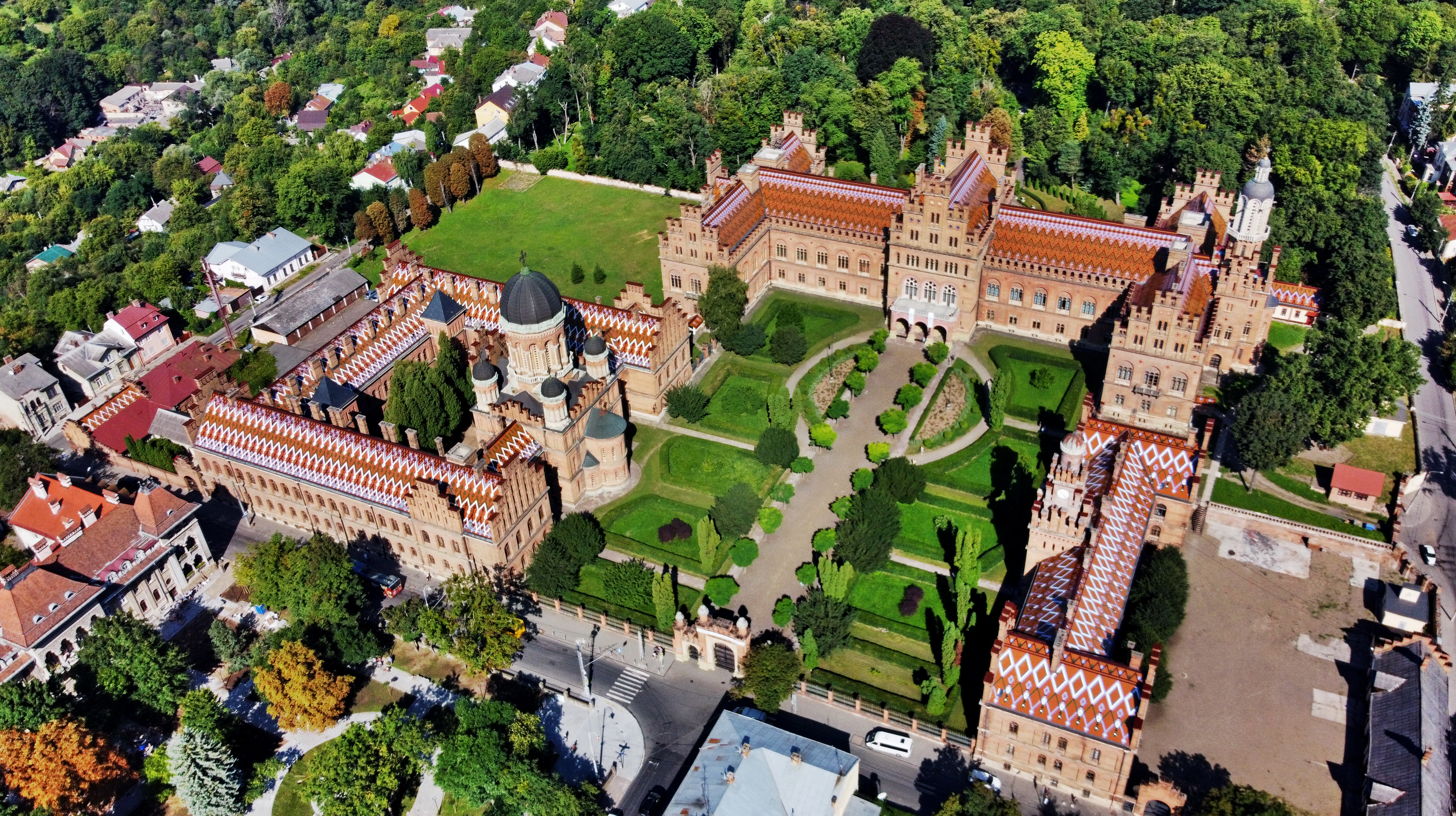
Residence of the Metropolitans in Chernivtsi

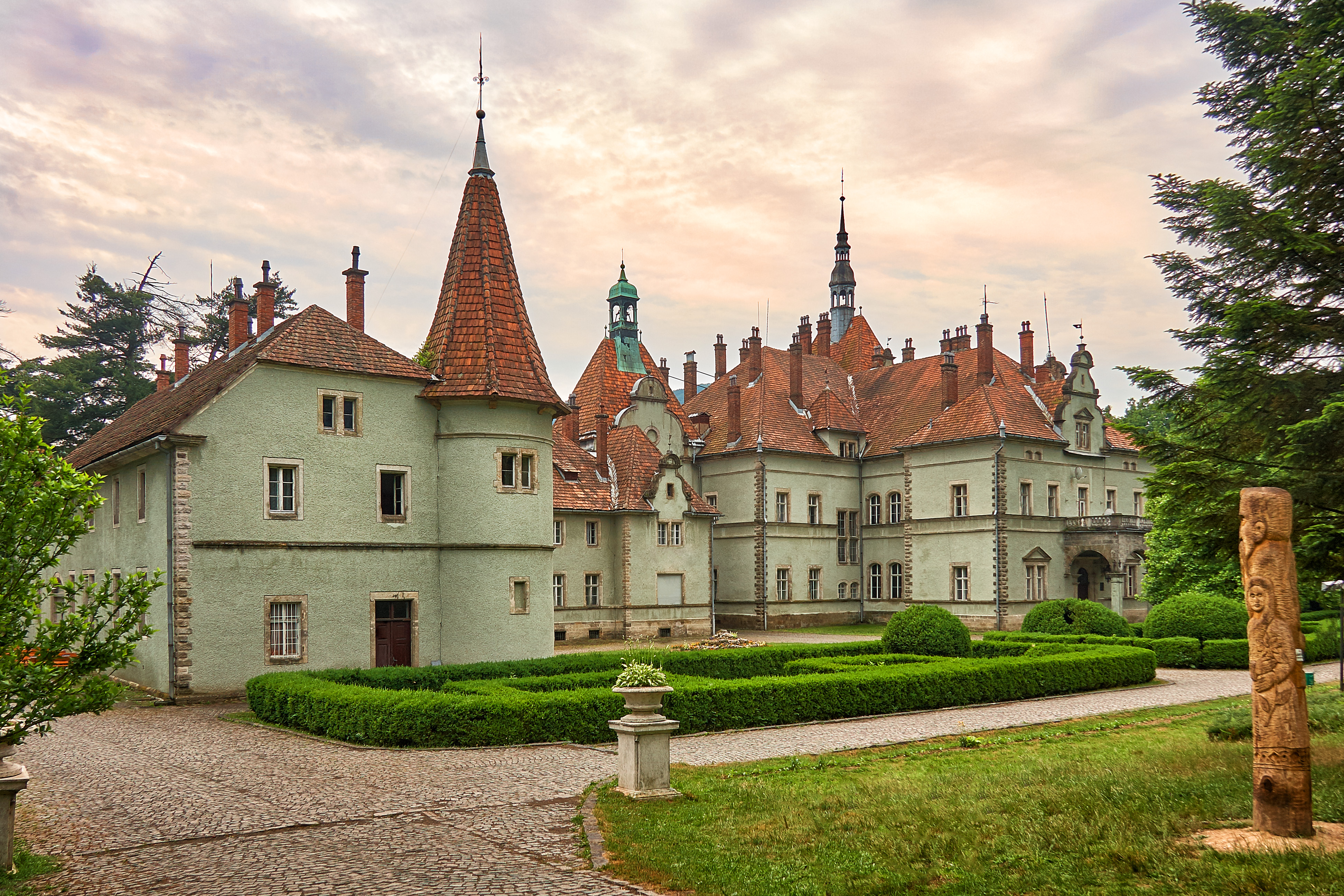
Schoenborn Castle-Palace in Zakarpattia Oblast

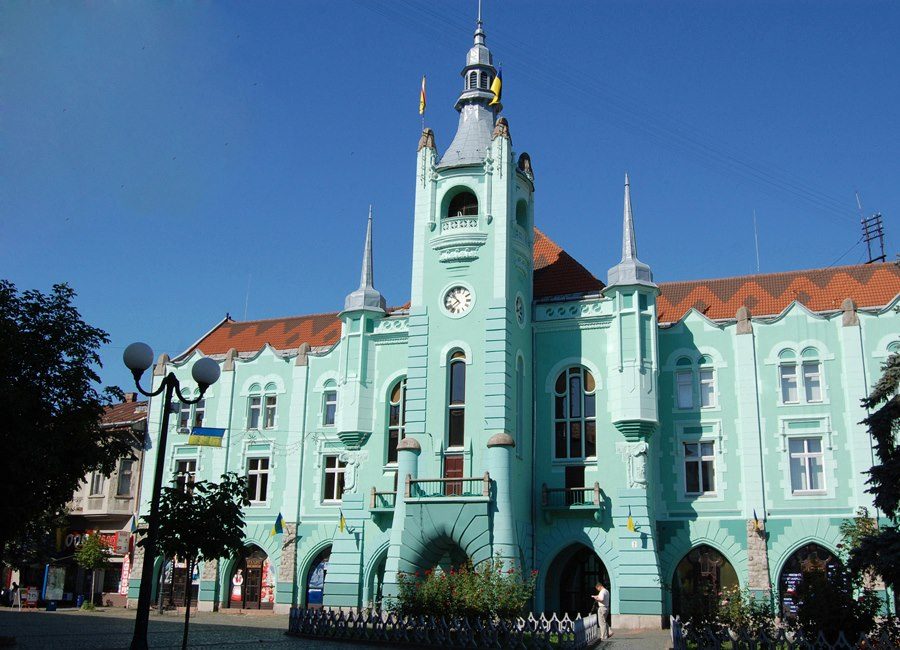
Mukachevo Town Hall

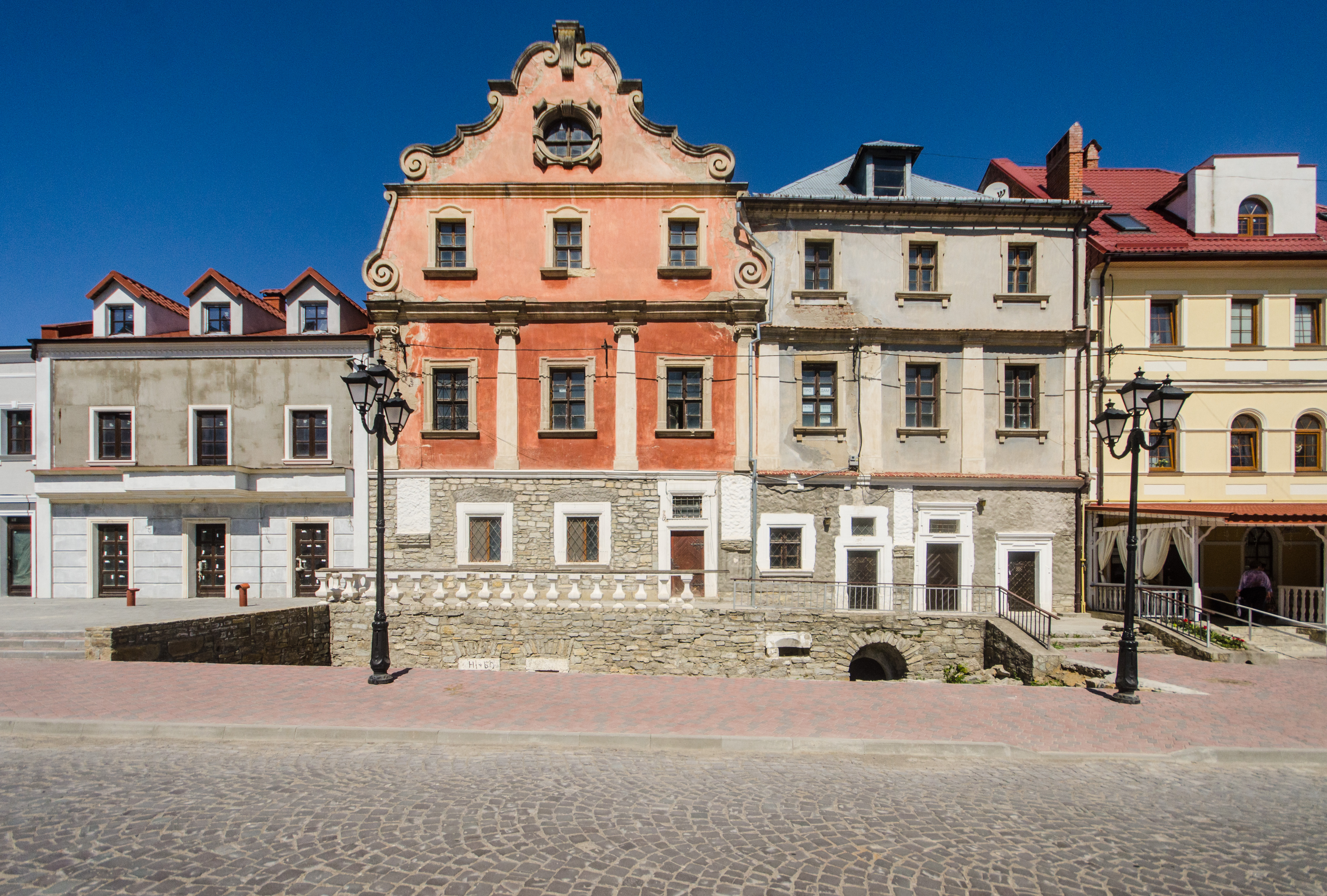
Centre of Kamianets-Podilskyi

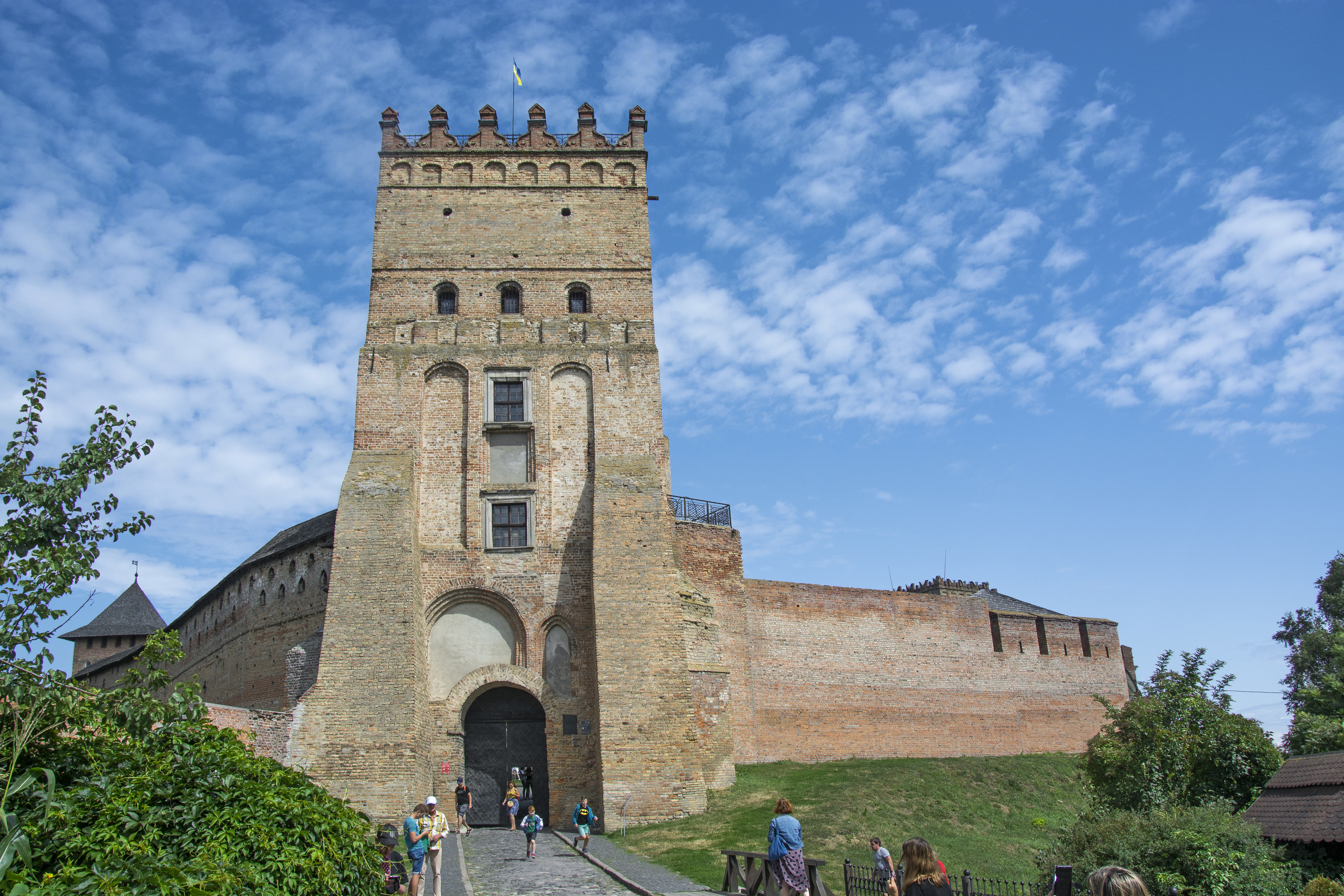
Gate tower of Lubart's Castle in Lutsk

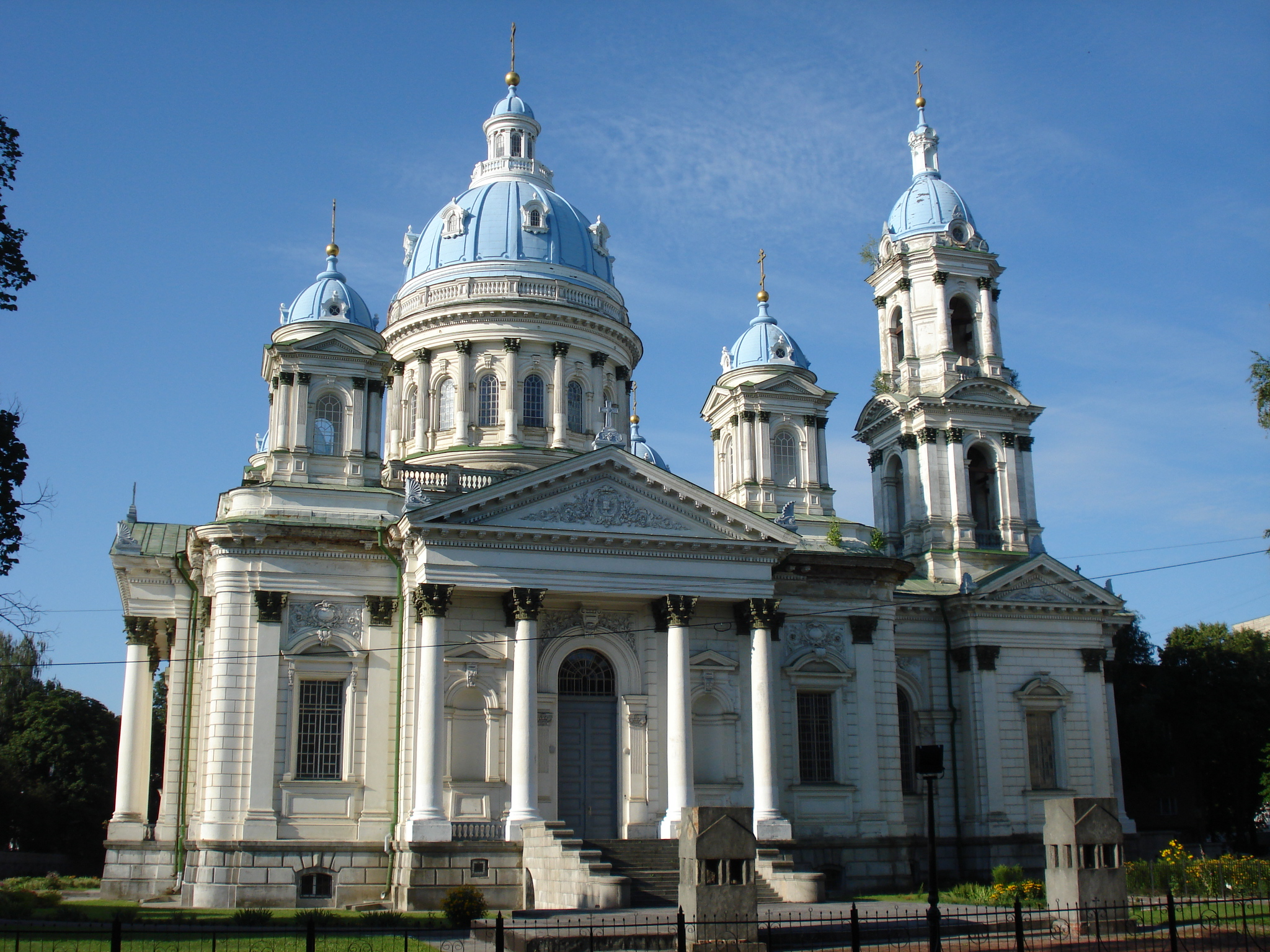
Trinity Cathedral in Sumy

Multimedia Fountain Roshen in Vinnytsia, the largest floating fountain in Europe

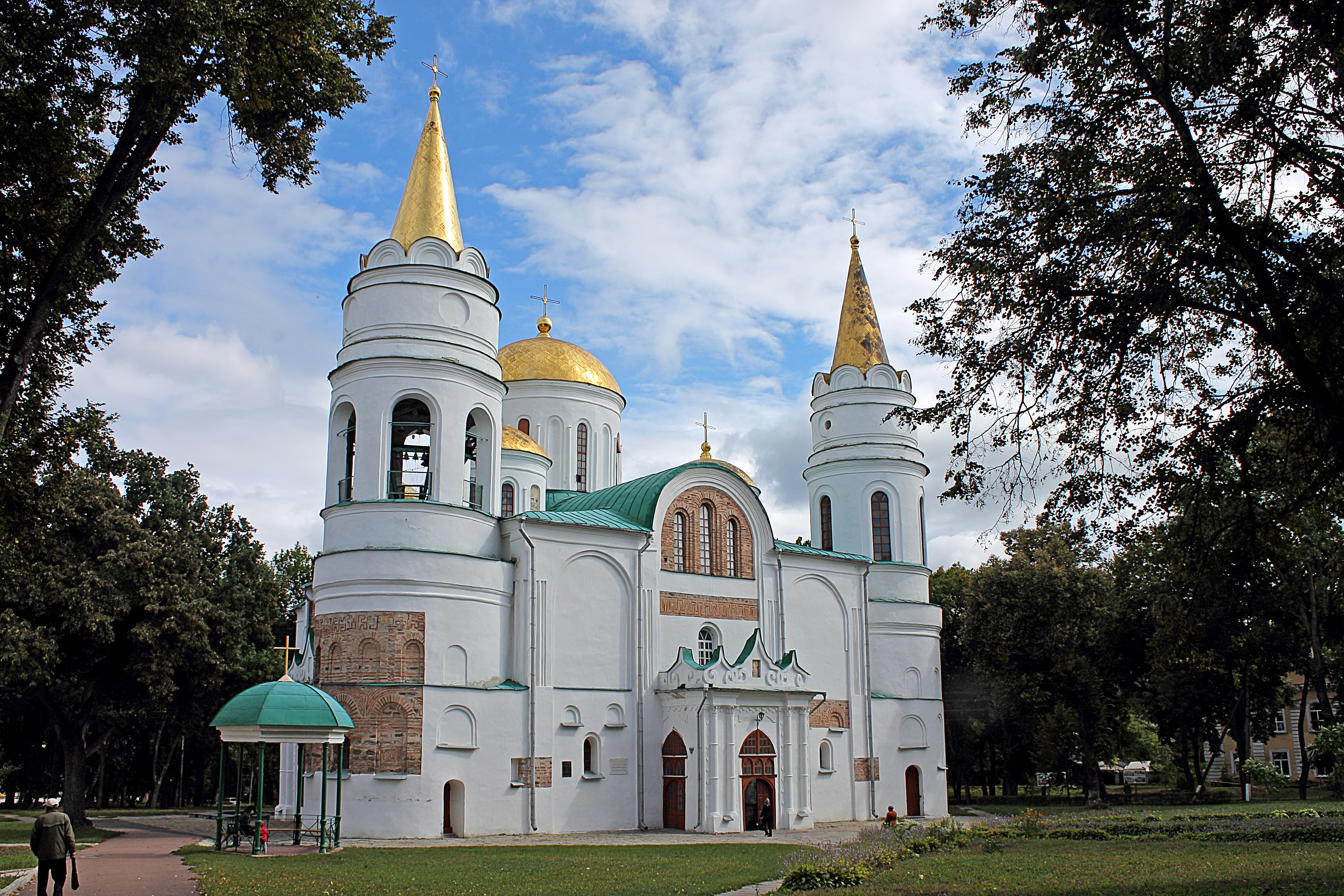
Transfiguration Cathedral in Chernihiv

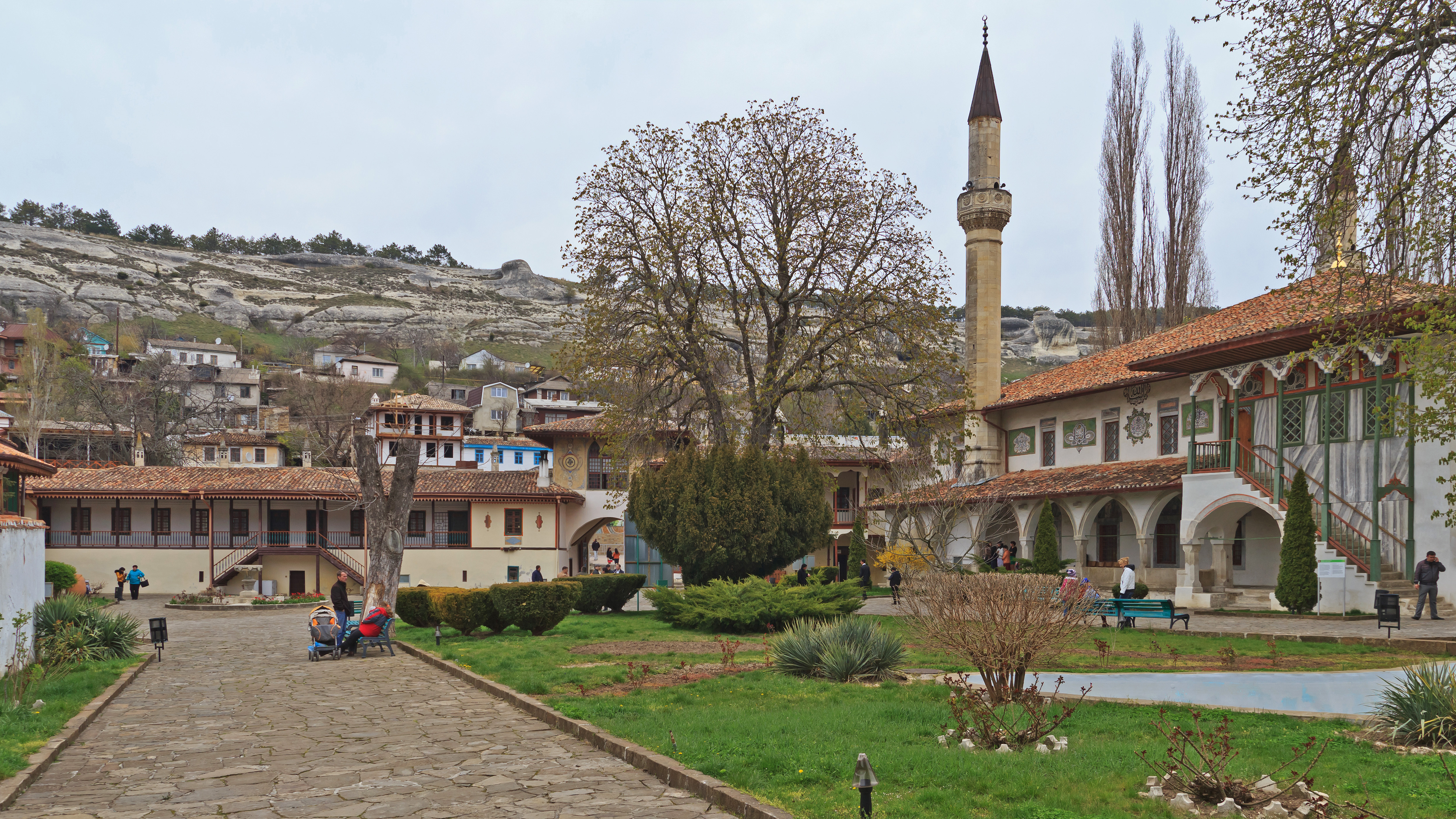
Khan's Palace in Bakhchysarai, Crimea

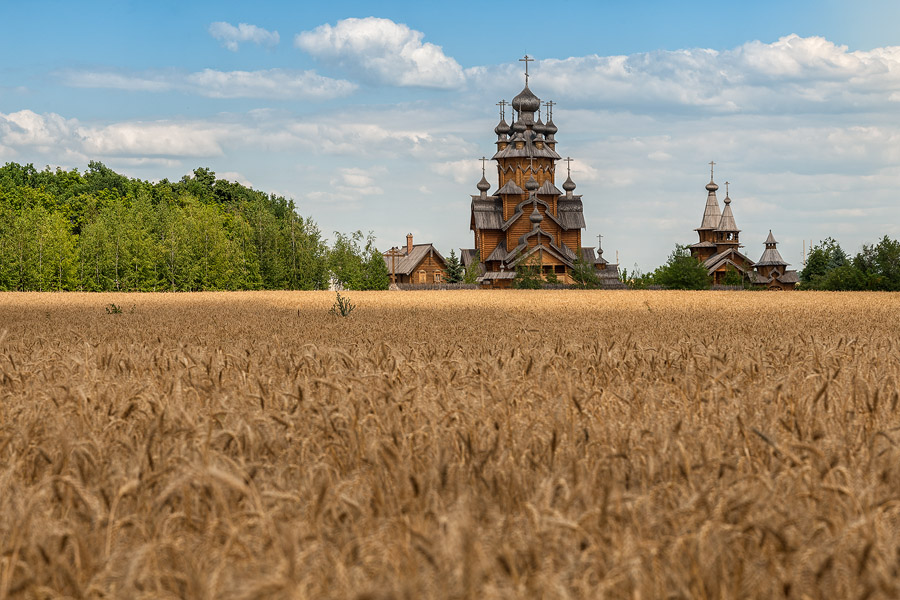
All Saints Scete of Sviatohirsk Lavra in Sviatohirsk, Donetsk Oblast

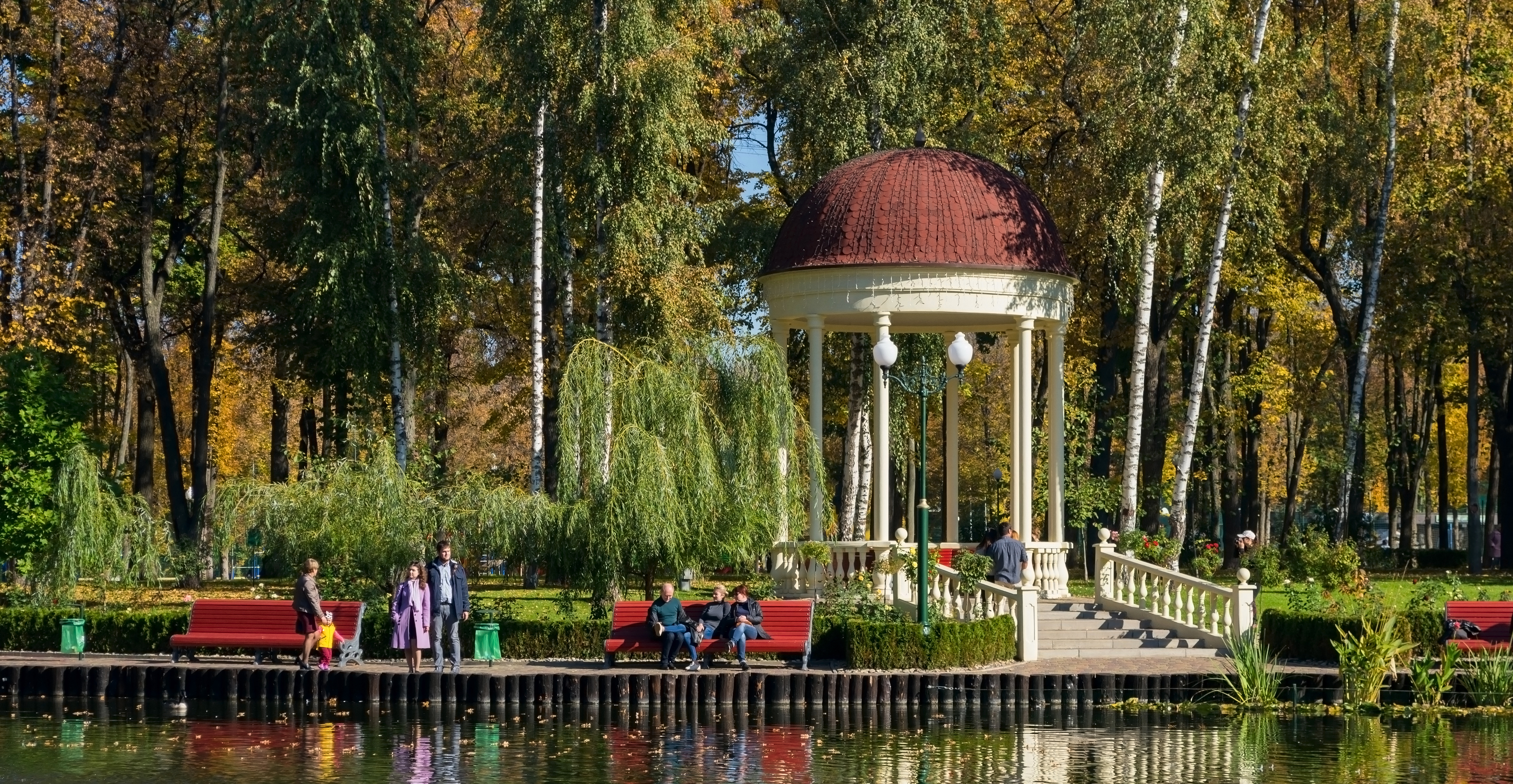
Central Park, one of the most visited attractions in Kharkiv

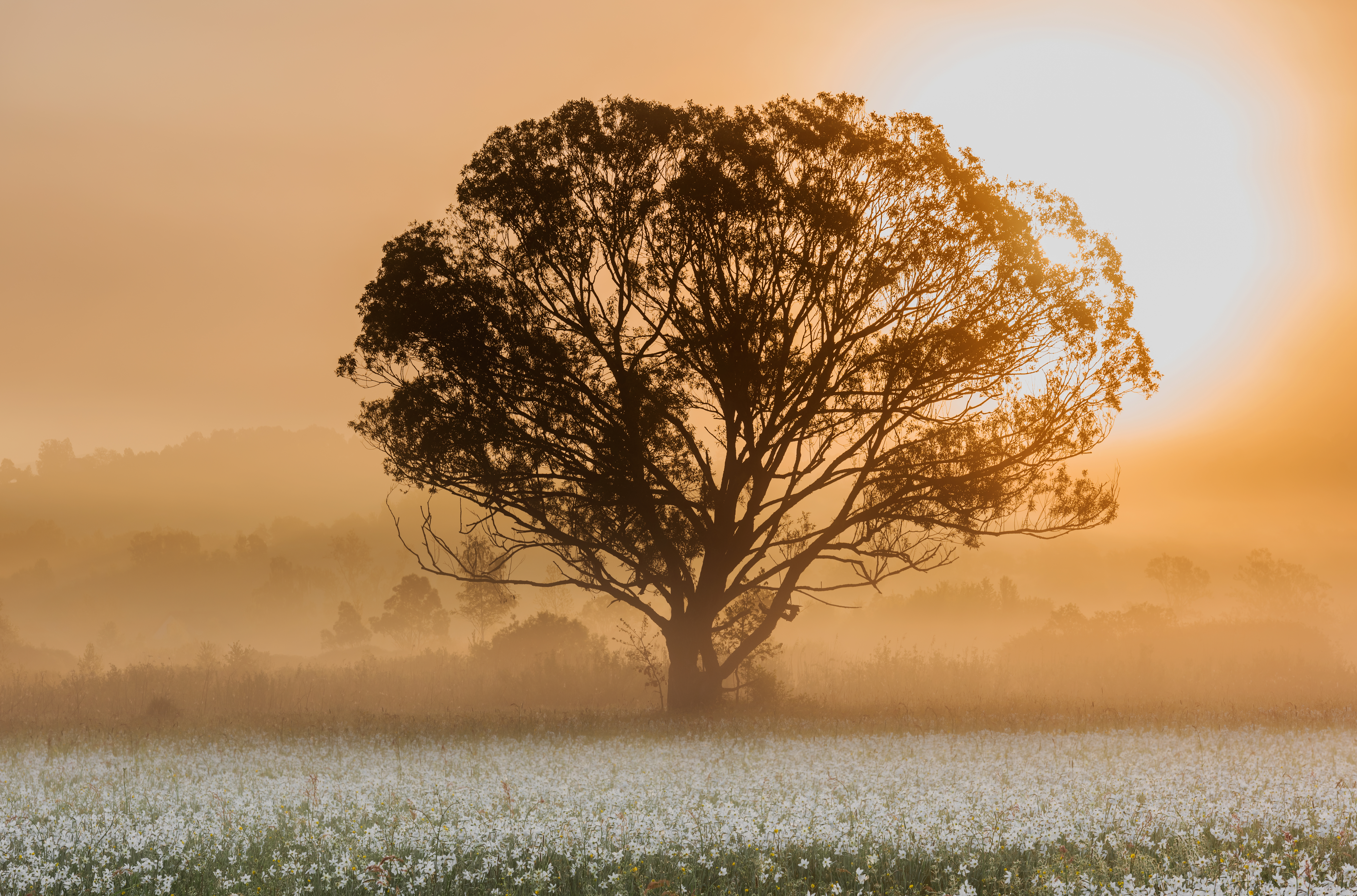
Valley of Narcissus in Zakarpattia Oblast

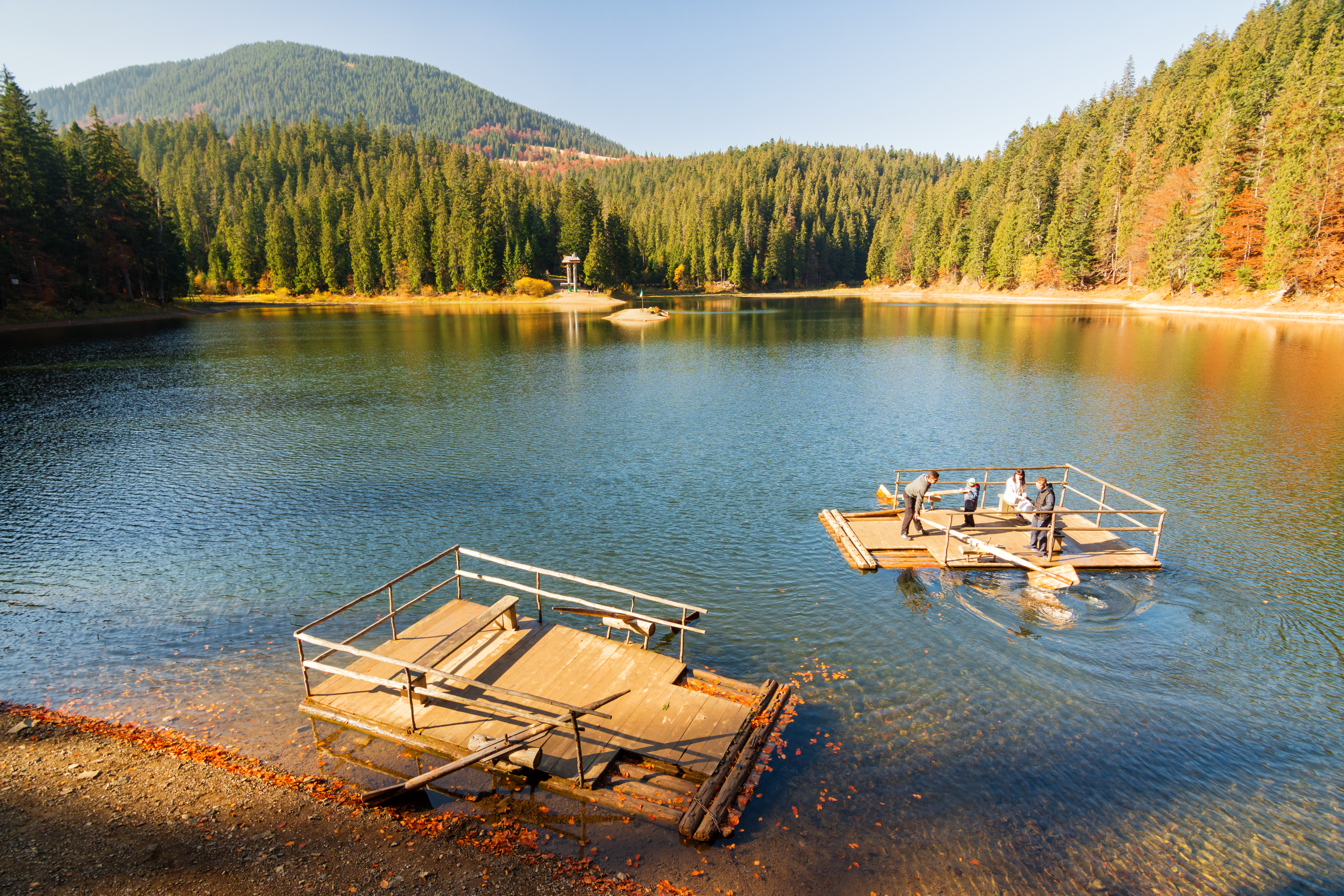
Lake Synevyr in Synevyr National Nature Park

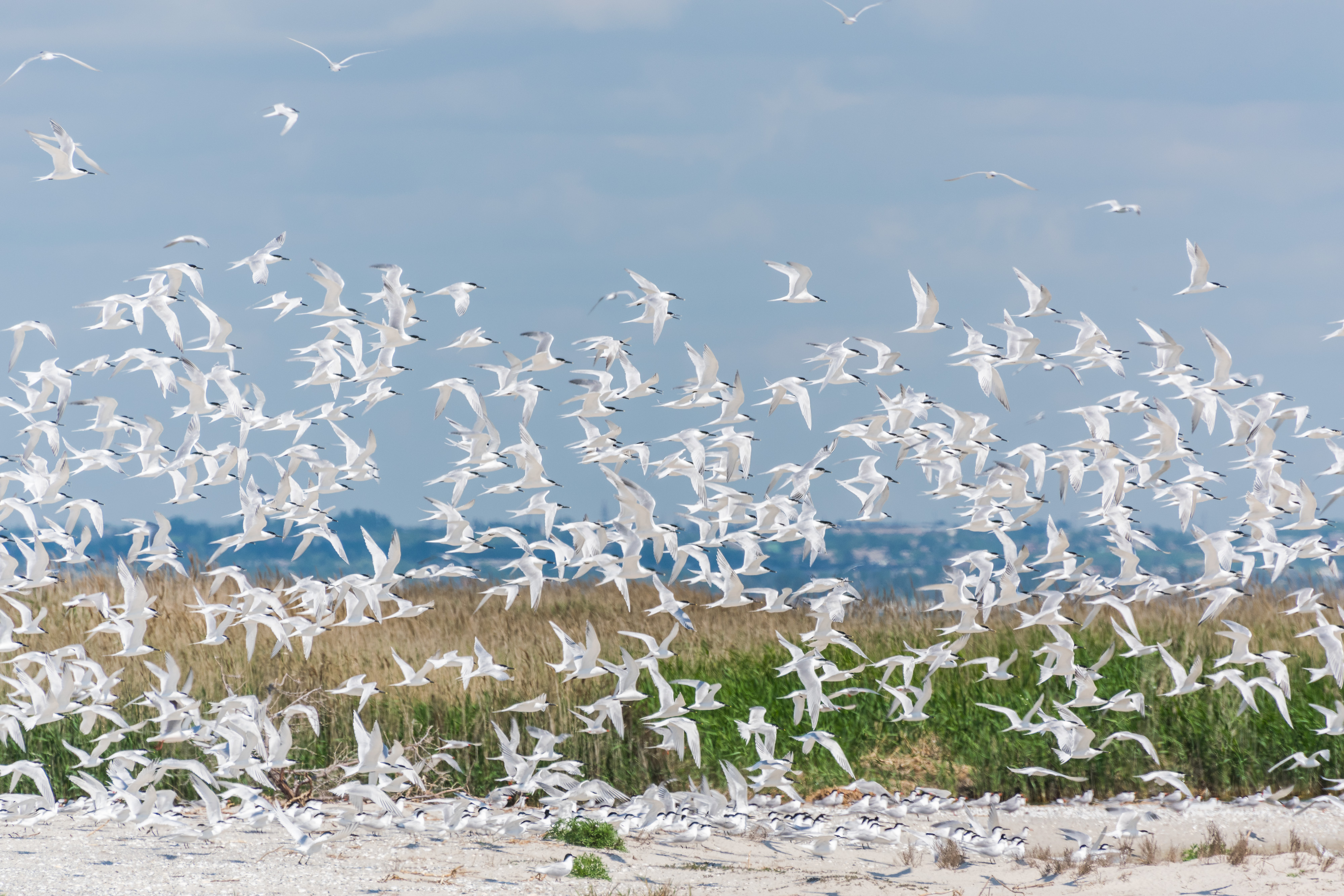
Common tern on Bilosaray Spit, Sea of Azov

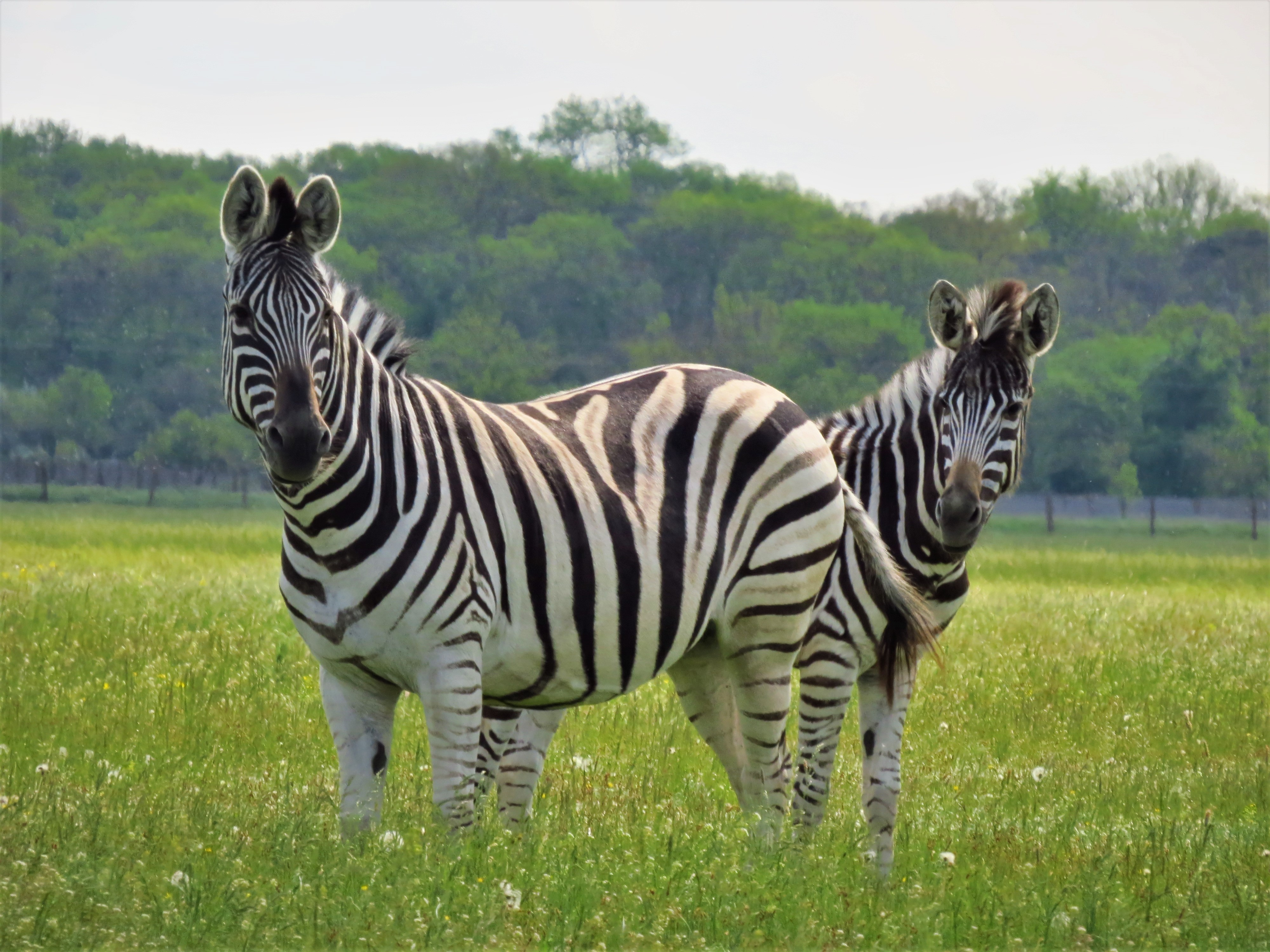
Askania-Nova biosphere reserve in Kherson Oblast, located within the dry Taurida steppe.

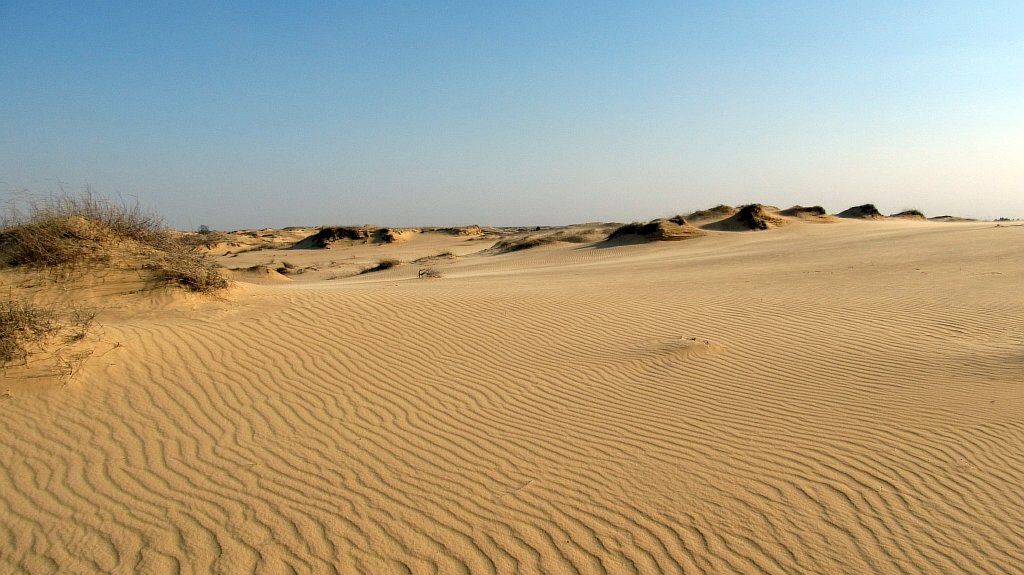
Oleshky Sands, the second-largest desert in Europe

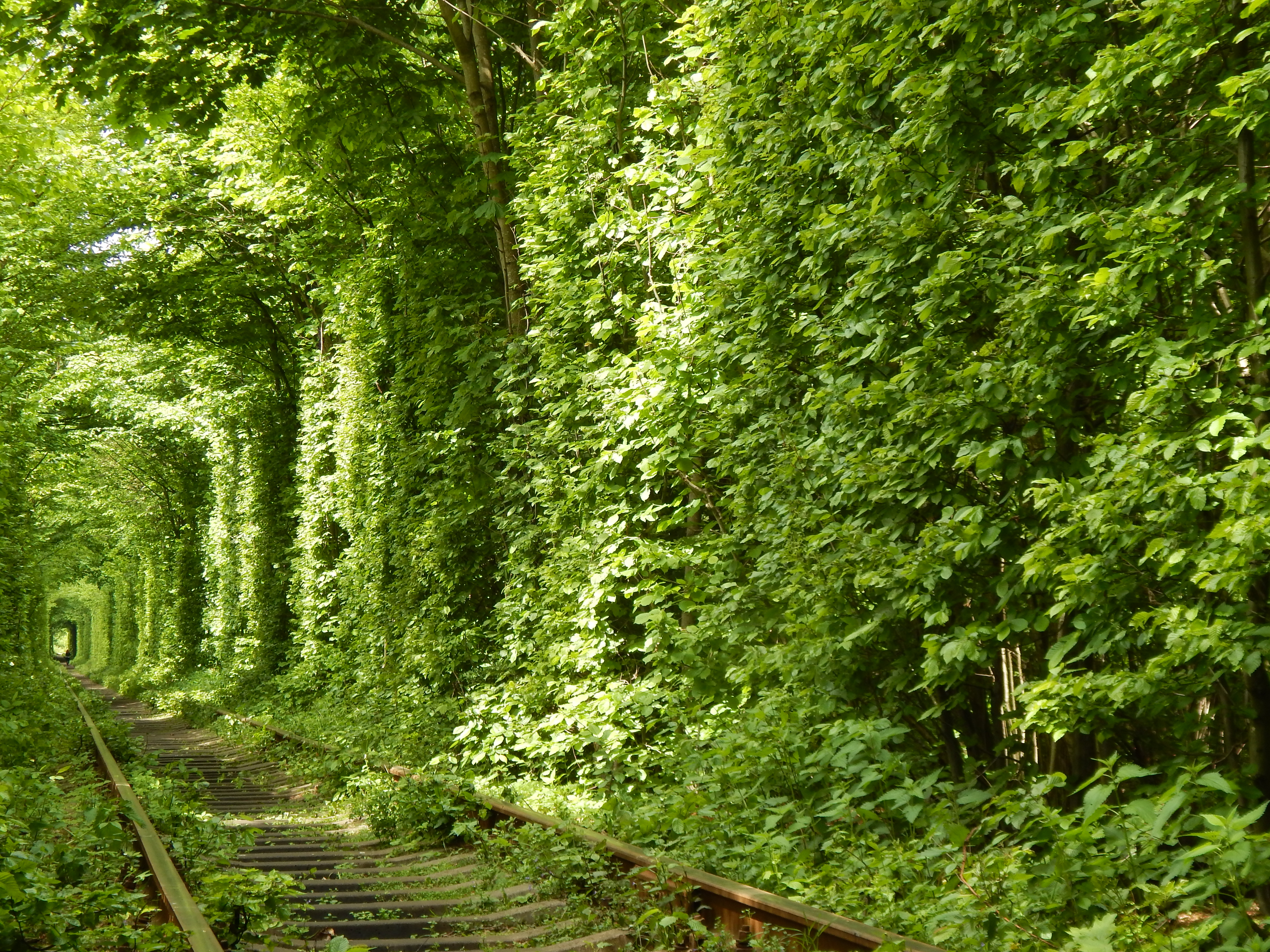
Tunnel of Love

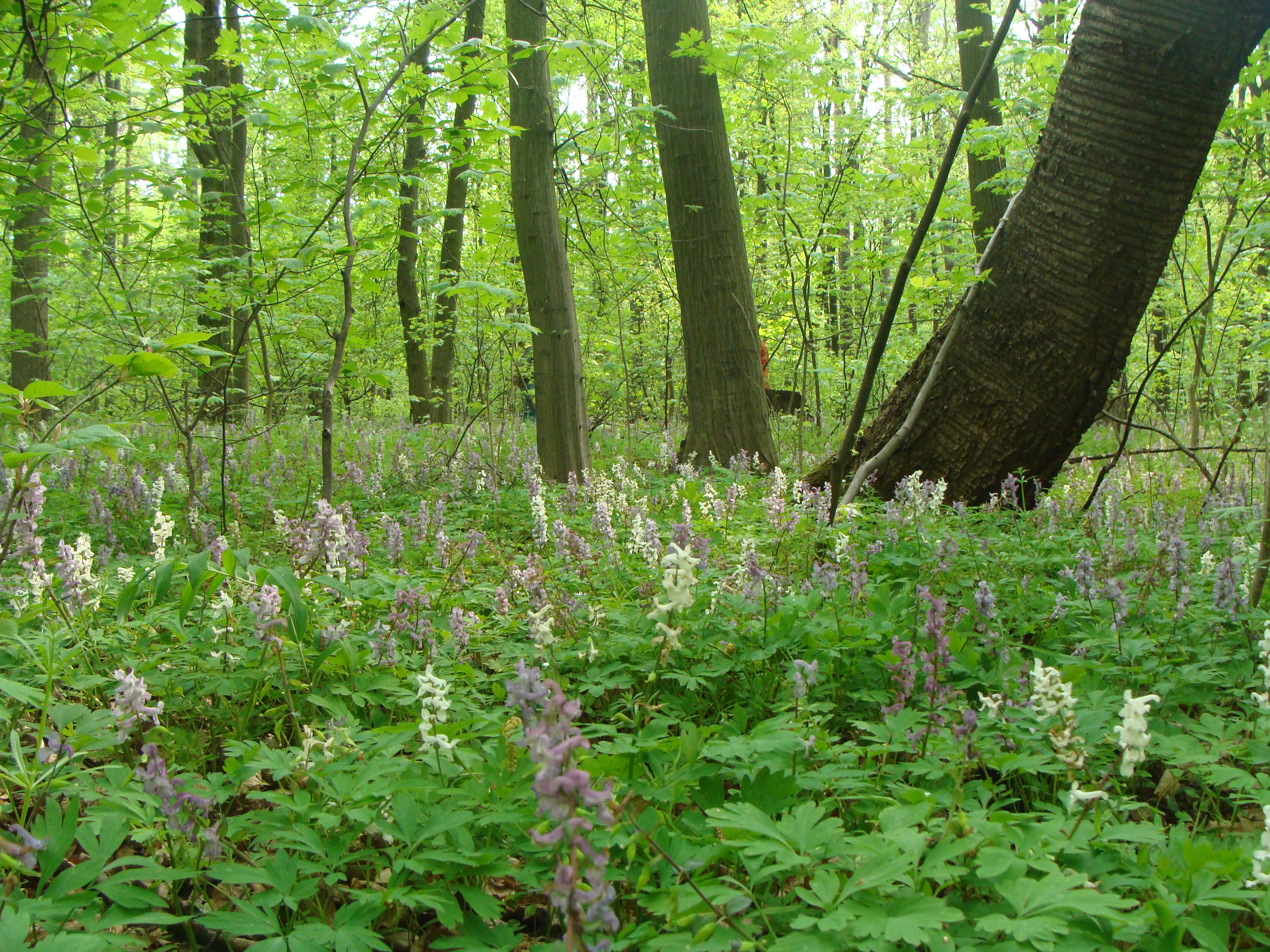
Holosiiv National Nature Park, Kyiv

== See also ==
- List of museums in Ukraine
- List of places named after people (Ukraine)
- List of UNESCO World Heritage Sites in Ukraine
- Seven Wonders of Ukraine
- Biosphere reserves of Ukraine
- Lists of Nature Reserves of Ukraine
- National Parks of Ukraine
- Transport in Ukraine
- Ukrainian cuisine
- Ukrainian culture
- Ukrainian historical regions
- Visa policy of Ukraine
- Wooden churches in Ukraine
