= Boris Levenson =

Russian composer

Boris Levinson (Loewensohn) (1884-1947) was a Russian-born American composer.

Levenson was born on 22 March 1884 in Akkerman, Bessarabia (now Bilhorod-Dnistrovskyi, Ukraine, then a province of Russian Empire). Levenson became a pupil of Nikolai Rimsky-Korsakov and was awarded a doctorate from the St. Petersburg Conservatory in 1907. Between 1907 and 1915 and conducted in St. Petersburg, Moscow, Kyiv, and Odessa.

He became a composer of his own right. A Bessarabian Jew, Levenson focused his work on Jewish folk songs.

He accompanied a March 1921 performance of his work in London's Aeolian Hall by the Philharmonic String Quartet and assorted guests.

His first U.S. concert was given in New York's Aeolian Hall in 1922. He performed and conducted his own works frequently in New York, including an annual concert at Carnegie Chamber Music Hall. Among his collaborators included bassonist Simon Kovar, Lorenzo Sansone, and Nina Koshetz.

His musical output also includes a string quartet among other works. This was performed in a concert of his works in London, England in April, 1920.

He died in March 1947 in New York City.

== Selected compositions ==
- Danse Orientale, op. 66 for violin and piano
- The Dawn, song
- Dreams (Episodes from Life: Youth, First Love, Struggles, Peaceful Old Age)
- A Fantasy on Two Hebrew Folk Tunes
- Gaily Lived the Tiny Mouse
- The Greedy Mousie, op. 87, Russian fable, song
- Hebrew Grand Fantasia
- Hebrew Suite for eight solo instruments
- Let There Be Music, op. 83, a prayer for SSAA chorus, words by Sydney King Russell.
- A Night in Bagdad
- Night in Hamadan, song
- The Nights and Days Unbroken Stream, song
- Oriental Fantasie for cello and orchestra
- Palestine, a Hebrew suite in four movements, premiered in 1926 in New York's Aeolian Hall.
- Quartet in B-flat
- The Sad Birch Tree, song
- Schir Bres, an ancient Palestinian cradle song arranged for SSA choir.
- Serenade, song
- Song of Orient
- The Volga
- Three Folk Songs for string quartet and piano, premiered March 1st, 1921 in London. 1. Jewish/Palestine, 2. Armenian (Crimean Haitarma), 3. Russian (Boatmen on the Volga)
