= Caprara =

Caprara can refer to:

- Aeneas de Caprara, Austrian field marshal
- Giovanni Battista Caprara, Italian statesman and cardinal
- Palais Caprara-Geymüller, a palace in Vienna

== See also ==
- Prati di Caprara, an urban forest in Bologna
