= Regazzoni =

Regazzoni is a surname. Notable people with the surname include:

- Alberto Regazzoni (born 1983), Swiss footballer
- Carlos Regazzoni (1943–2020), Argentine sculptor
- Clay Regazzoni (1939–2006), Swiss racing driver

== See also ==
- Reguzzoni
- Ragazzoni
