= Prati di Caprara =

Urban woodland in Bologna, Italy

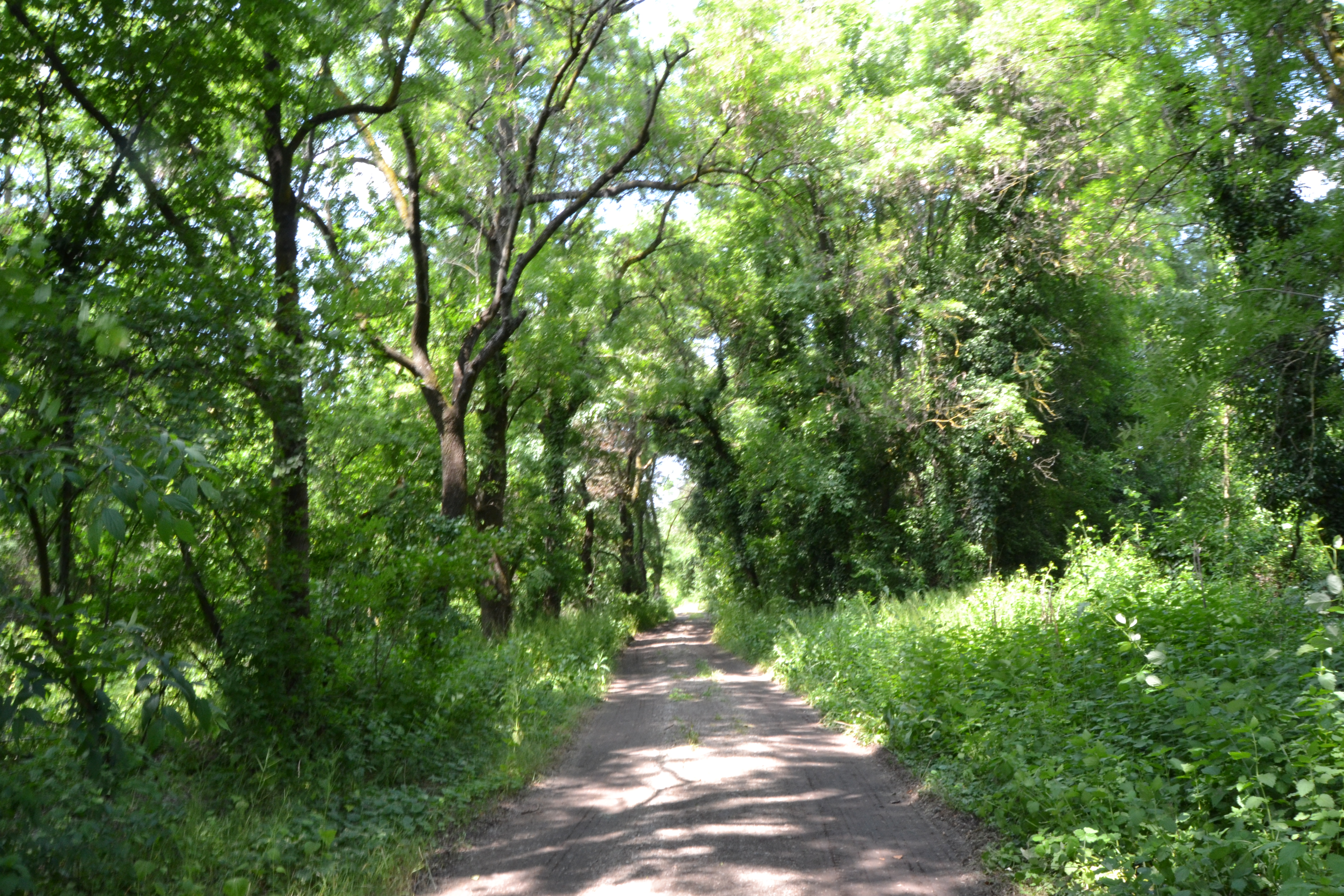
- Interactive map of Prati di Caprara
- Type: Urban forest
- Coordinates: 44.5076865°N 11.3153273°EItaly - Bologna
- Area: More than 100 acres

Prati di Caprara (Italian: Meadows of Caprara) is a large urban forest in Bologna, Italy, located to the west of the historic city centre, near the Ospedale Maggiore. Covering approximately 47 hectares, it is one of the largest semi-natural areas within the city.

== Location ==
“Prati di Caprara” (Meadows of Caprara) is a former military area of Bologna located near the city center, outside Porta San Felice, opposite to the Maggiore Hospital. The area develops between Via Emilia Ponente, the Ravone stream and the small canal Ghisiliera.

== History ==
The noble family of Caprara probably donated Prati di Caprara to Bologna Municipality around the end of the eighteenth century; during Napoleon Bonaparte's official visit to the city, on June 21–25, 1805 a military parade in his honor was staged at Prati di Caprara. After the unification of Italy in 1861, Prati di Caprara became a military area and was used as a ground for conducting military exercises, parades and horse competitions. The flat and clear nature of the area had always made Prati di Caprara the ideal site for horse racing organized by the Bolognese Horse Racing Society. The mixed military-equestrian use of the area was sealed in 1897 with the inauguration of a racecourse that replaced the inadequate one of the Montagnola park, in the city center. With the permission of the military authorities, in 1909 the area welcomed the soccer field of the newly founded Bologna Football Club. Prati di Caprara hosted an aviation event in 1910, and on September 24, 1913, the flight of Francesco Baracca landed here from Taliedo (Milan). A few days later, on October 1, 1913, the parade ground of Prati di Caprara became the airport for the aircraft and the airships of the army.

When the Bologna Airport was relocated to Borgo Panigale, in 1931, the airfield of Prati di Caprara became playground for the paramilitary exercises of "Fascist Saturdays". According to Giulio Pallotta (Mayor of the nearby village of Fontanelice during World War Two), Prati di Caprara in Bologna was used as a concentration camp for prisoners of the Allied army. "When signing the Armistice the gates were opened and hundreds of American, British, South African, Canadian, Indian and Australian prisoners escaped from town and vanished in the nearby countryside".

On the day of the liberation of Bologna from the Nazi-fascist occupation, citizens, partisans, allied soldiers and tanks crowded the main square, Piazza Maggiore; the future Mayor of Bologna, Giuseppe Dozza, Borghese and Zoccoli, the President of the regional CLN (Comitato Liberazione Nazionale, National Committee for Liberation) greeted the citizens from the balcony of the municipality. The celebration was disrupted by the finding of the corpses of the partisans Sante Vincenzi and Giuseppe Bentivogli, slaughtered and abandoned into the Prati di Caprara by the fascists while fleeing.

== Prati di Caprara today ==
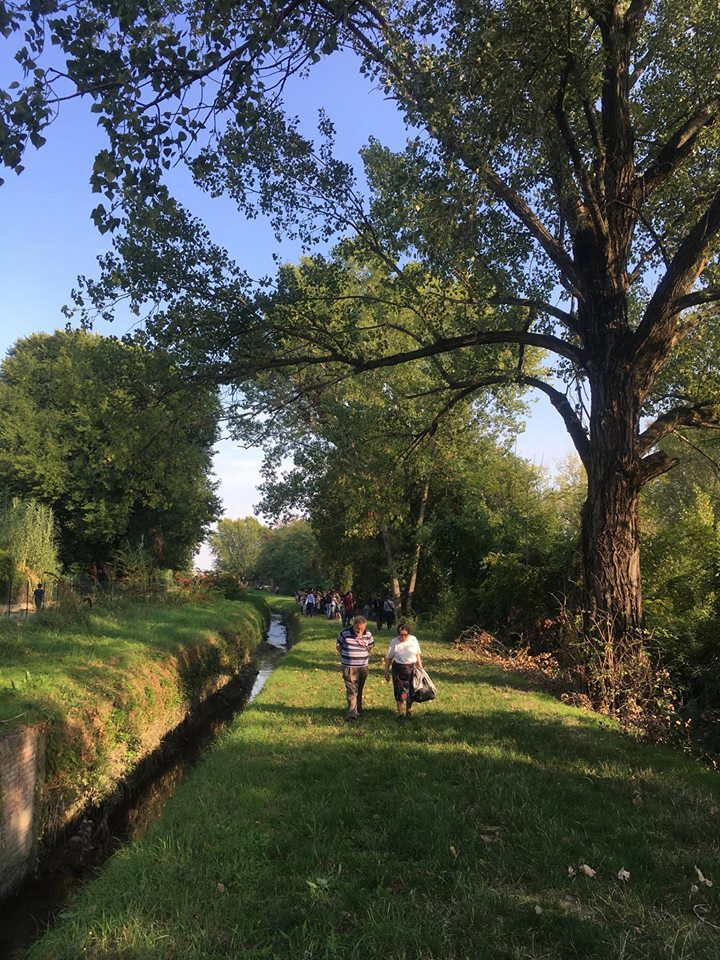
Channel Ghisiliera near the Prati di Caprara Est northern border

Prati di Caprara today is a state-owned area entrusted to Invimit Sgr, a company of the Ministry of Economy and Finance, which offers asset management services for real estate investment trusts. They comprehend two areas, which have been left over to landscape evolution and to nature alone since the late fifties. The east ground with its 27 hectares is an urban woodland, by far the biggest green area of Bologna, even larger than the main park Giardini Margherita. The west ground, of about 16 hectares, is only partially inhabited by spontaneous vegetation and houses the dismantled San Felice Barracks (only a few buildings are still in use). The Meadows of Caprara is currently a candidate in the competition for “place of the heart 2018”, a campaign of the Italian Environment Fund (FAI).

=== Characters of the Prati di Caprara Est urban forest ===
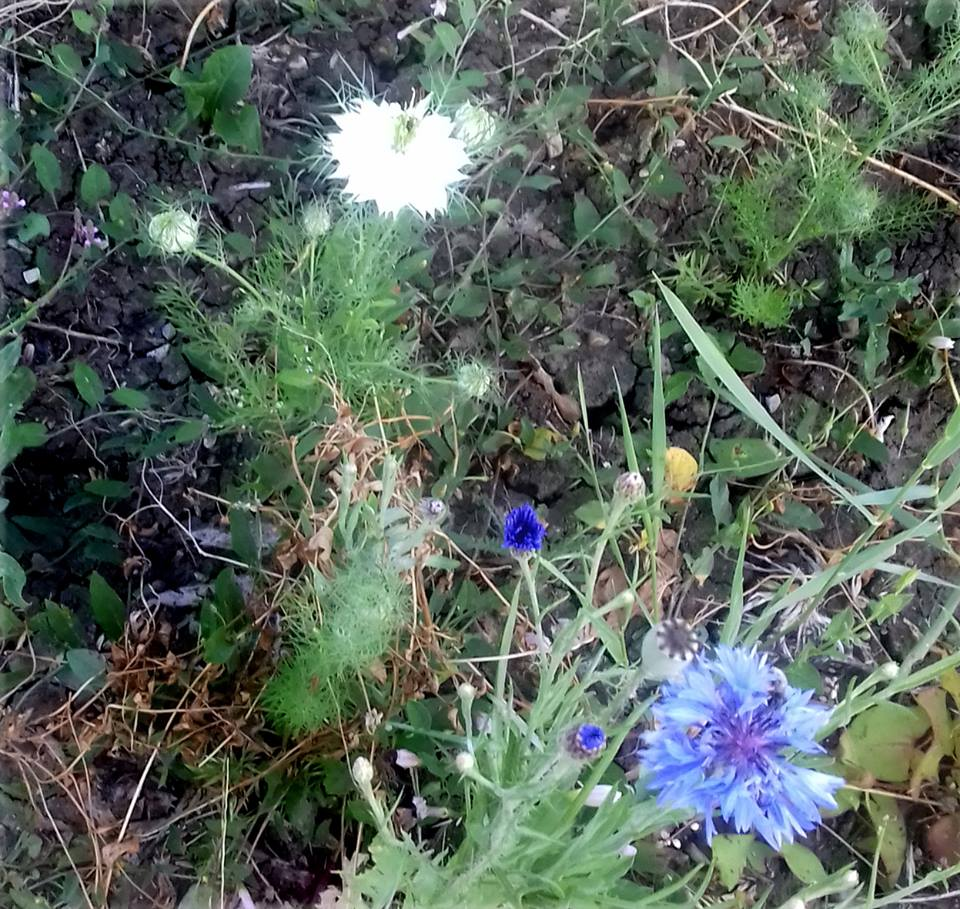

The “Prati di Caprara Est” is a "wild urban woodland" (sensu Kowarik 2005) that is the result of a "spontaneous establishment of shrubs and trees that occurs in abandoned urban and industrial areas without any human predefined scheme". The dominant tree layer is mainly composed of pioneer species such as black locust (Robinia pseudoacacia L.), white poplar (Populus alba L.) and Canadian poplar (Populus x canadensis Moench). Some areas are dominated by young communities of tree of heaven (Ailanthus altissima (Mill.) Swingle) and narrow-leafed ash (Fraxinus oxycarpa M. Bieb. ex willd). There are many trees of considerable diameter and height of about forty years old. These species are gradually going to be replaced by other species more typical of the remnant plain forests: there are in fact several saplings of common oak (Quercu robur L.) and field elm (Ulmus minor Mill.). Inside the woodland are numerous ecological niches (dead wood in different stages of decomposition, shady and humid microenvironments alternated with little meadows) which are essential for the life of many biodiversity taxa (insects, small mammals, mushrooms, plants) linked to wild forests; indeed these species aren't able to survive in more conventional urban green areas. Until now, field surveys reported at least 150 plant species, most of them typical of woodland or ecotones environment.

Regarding bird life, researchers highlight the presence of European robin (Erithacus rubecula), a species which normally doesn't nest in urban areas, common nightingale (Luscinia megarhynchos) and peregrine falcon (Falco peregrinus), which flies above the woodland for trophic reasons. Moreover, the presence of the common moorhen (Gallinula chloropus) highlights the existence of temporary wet areas within the forest.

== Peculiarities ==
Prati di Caprara appears in the novel by the Bolognese writer Riccardo Bacchelli, The Devil at Pontelungo, which tells the Italian vicissitudes of the Russian revolutionary Michail Bakunin and his disciple Carlo Cafiero. Among the episodes of the novel there was the failed anarchist insurrection of 1874 in Bologna, which brought the young Andrea Costa to jail. The insurrection was meant to start at the Anarchist meeting at Prati di Caprara and precisely at Pontelungo's bridge, between the rione Santa Viola and Borgo Panigale.

In April 1906 Prati di Caprara was the site of the second Buffalo Bill's Italian tour, as documented by the photographs of Indians riding outside the exhibition tent.

The famous Italian writer and director Pier Paolo Pasolini used to play soccer at the Prati di Capara during his university years in Bologna:

"The afternoons I spent playing soccer on the Meadows of Caprara... were undoubtedly the most beautiful of my life. I almost get a knot in my throat if I think about it. At that time, the Bologna football team was the most powerful of its history: that of Biavati and Sansone, of Reguzzoni and Andreolo (the King of the camp), of Marchesi, Fedullo and Pagotto. I have never seen anything more beautiful than the exchanges between Biavati and Sansone (Reguzzoni was taken a bit as a model by Pascutti). What Sundays at the Municipal Stadium!"

Below the western ground of Prati di Caprara is buried the rubble of the 1980s massacre at Bologna's railway station; they were the subject of evidence during the third process, in July 2018.

== Bibliography ==
- R. Bacchelli., Il diavolo al Pontelungo. Historical Novel. With a chronology of the author's life and its times, introduction and bibliography by Edmondo Aroldi, Milano, Mondadori, 1987
- I. Kowarik, 2005, Wild urban woodlands: towards a conceptual frame work. In: Kowarik I, Körner S. «eds» Wild urban woodlands. Springer-Verlag Berlin Heidelberg. Doi: 10.1007/3-540-26859-6_1
- L. Morìni, ...per essere libere; Sindaco dei giorni difficili, in V. Paticchia, Sindaci e governatori della liberazione in provincia di Bologna (1944-1945).
- P. P. Pasolini, Lettere 1940-1954, edited by N. Naldini, Torino, Einaudi 1986.
