= Akkerman Convention =

Treaty signed on October 7, 1826, between the Russian and the Ottoman Empires

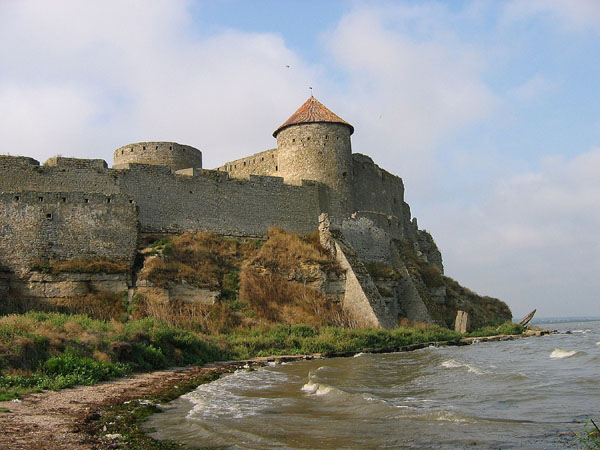
Akkerman fortress

The Akkerman Convention was a treaty signed on October 7, 1826, between the Russian and the Ottoman Empires in the Budjak citadel of Akkerman (present-day Bilhorod-Dnistrovskyi, Ukraine). It imposed that the hospodars of Moldavia and Wallachia be elected by their respective Divans for seven-year terms, with the approval of both Powers. It also provided for the retreat of Ottoman forces from both Danubian Principalities after their prolonged stay following military actions in 1821 (that were carried in response to the Filiki Etaireía in the Greek War of Independence), and Tudor Vladimirescu's uprising. The Ottomans also agreed to cede to Wallachia the control over the Danube ports of Giurgiu, Brăila and Turnu. The convention also tackled the Serbian question: in article 5, autonomy for the Principality of Serbia was given, and the return of lands removed in 1813. Serbs were also granted freedom of movement through the Ottoman Empire.

Sultan Mahmud II's repudiation of the convention triggered the Russo-Turkish War (1828–1829).

== See also ==
- List of treaties
