= Bilhorod-Dnistrovskyi =

City in Odesa Oblast, Ukraine

Bilhorod-Dnistrovskyi Білгород-Дністровський Cetatea Albă (Romanian)
- City
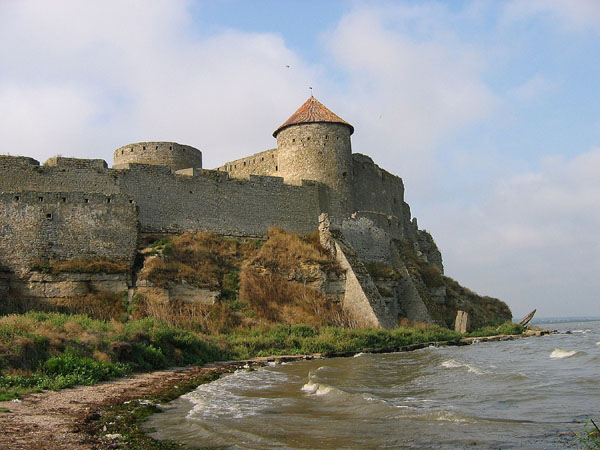
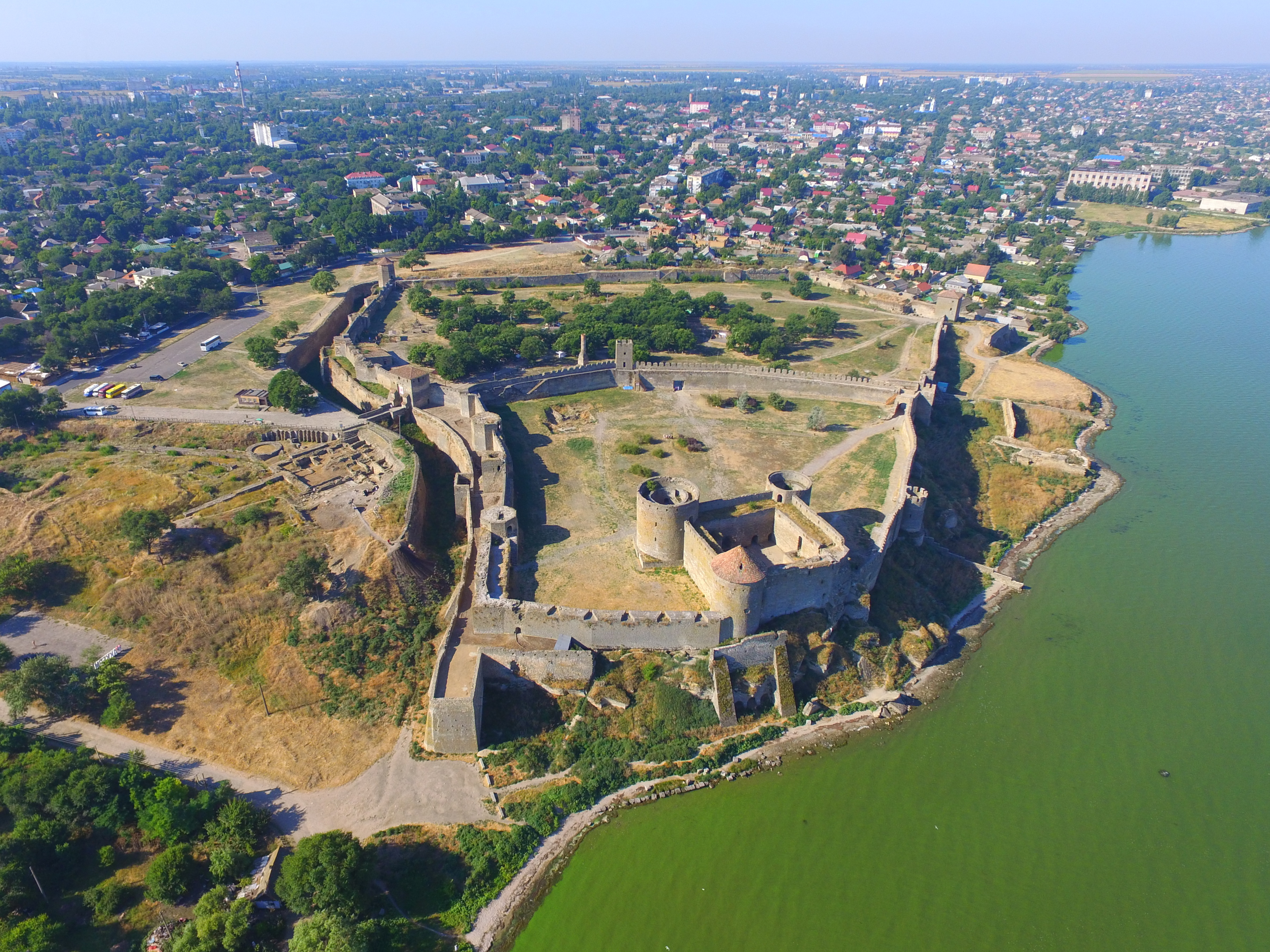
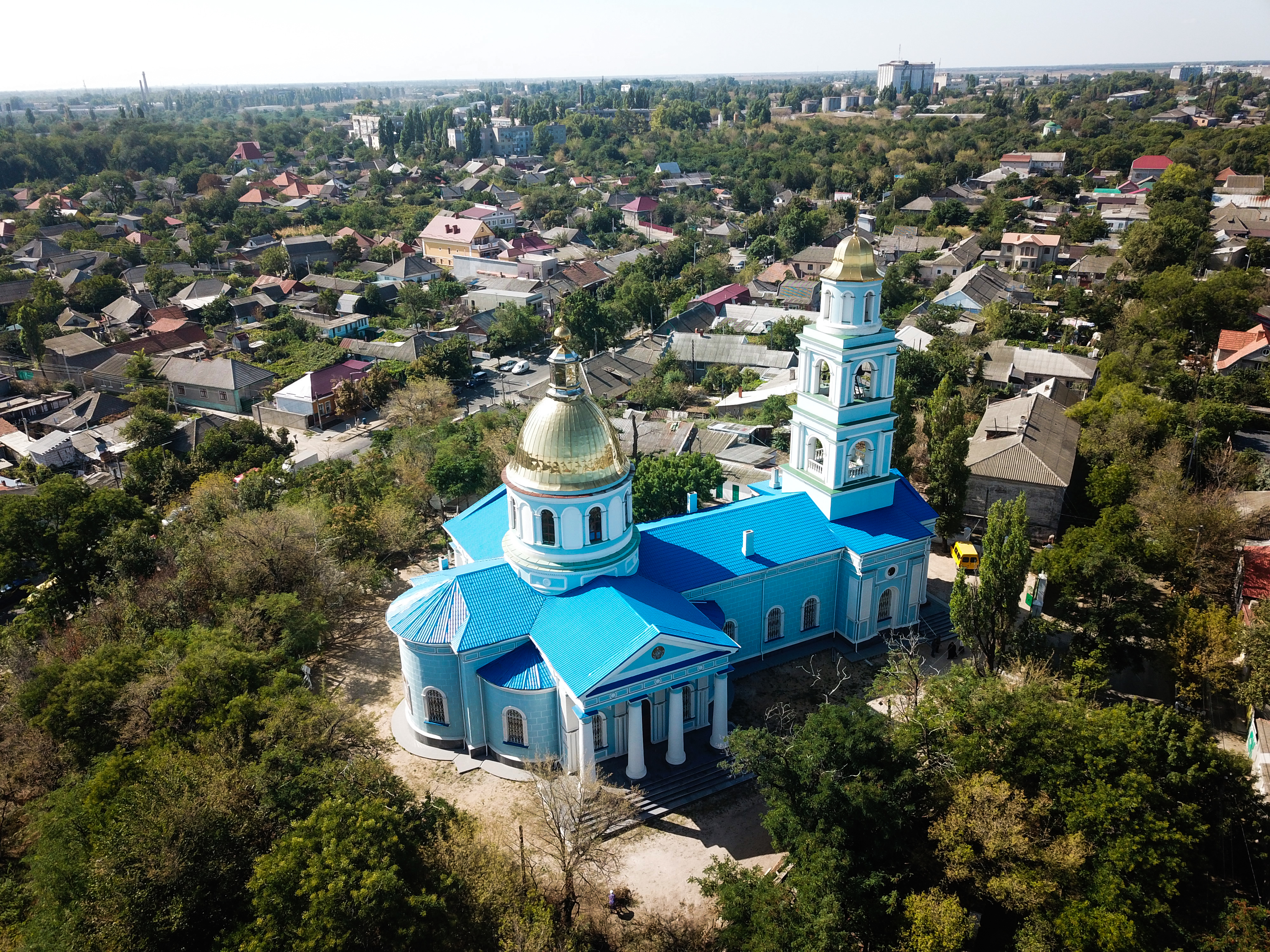
- Clockwise from top: Fortress; Savior-Transfiguration Cathedral; view on the Fortress and Tyras from above

- Flag Coat of arms

- Location in Ukraine Bilhorod-Dnistrovskyi (Ukraine)
- Coordinates: 46°11′N 30°21′E
- Country: Ukraine
- Oblast: Odesa Oblast
- Raion: Bilhorod-Dnistrovskyi Raion
- Hromada: Bilhorod-Dnistrovskyi urban hromada

Area
  - Total: 31 km^{2} (12 sq mi)
- Elevation: 28 m (92 ft)

Population (2022)
  - Total: 47,727
- Time zone: UTC+2 (EET)
  - Summer (DST): UTC+3 (EEST)
- Postal code: 67700—67719
- Area code: +380 4849
- Climate: Cfb
- Website: bilgorod-d.gov.ua

Bilhorod-Dnistrovskyi (Ukrainian: Білгород-Дністровський, IPA: [ˈbilɦorod d⁽ʲ⁾n⁽ʲ⁾iˈstrɔu̯sʲkɪj]; Romanian: Cetatea Albă; Russian: Белгород-Днестровский, romanized: Belgorod-Dnestrovskiy), historically known as Aq Kirmān (Turkish: Akkerman) or by other names, is a port city in Odesa Oblast, southwestern Ukraine. It is situated on the right bank of the Dniester Estuary leading to the Black Sea, in the historical region of Budjak. It also serves as the administrative center of Bilhorod-Dnistrovskyi Raion and is coterminous with Bilhorod-Dnistrovskyi urban hromada, one of the hromadas of Ukraine. It is the location of a large freight seaport. Population: 47,727 (2022 estimate).

== Name ==
The city of Bilhorod-Dnistrovskyi is also referred to by alternative transliterations from Ukrainian as Bilhorod-Dnistrovsky. Dnistrovskyi was added to differentiate it from Belgorod (in Ukrainian Bilhorod), a city in Russia, when both were a part of the Soviet Union.

Previous names

- Ophiussa (Οφιούσσα), Phoenician colony (meaning "city of snakes" in Greek)
- Tyras (Τύρας), Ancient Greek colony (also the Greek name for the River Dniester)
- Turis, Antes name
- Asprokastron (Ἀσπρόκαστρον, "White Castle"), Greek name in Antiquity and the Middle Ages. Name attested from 944 to 1484 AD.
- Maurokastron (Μαυρόκαστρον, "Black Castle"), Greek name of a Roman/Byzantine fort in late antiquity on a site directly opposite Asprokastron, but usually taken together.
- Album Castrum ("White Castle"), Latin name
- Cetatea Albă ("White Citadel"), Romanian name
- Moncastro, Italian corruption of Maurokastron used by Genoese traders and during Genoese rule (14th–15th centuries)
- Turla, Turkic
- Akkerman, Ottoman Turkish ("White Castle") and Russian name until 1944
- Aqkermen, Crimean Tatar name
- Belgorod-Dnestrovskiy, Russian (Белгород-Днестровский, "White city on the Dniester")
- Weißenburg, ("White Castle"), German name

During the reign of Burebista, the city was known as Tyras and was incorporated into the Dacian kingdom. The town became part of the Principality of Moldavia in 1359. The fortress was enlarged and rebuilt in 1407 under Alexander the Good and in 1440 under Stephen II of Moldavia. It fell to Ottoman conquest on 5 August 1487.

The city became part of Romania from 1918 to 1940, and once again between 1941 and 1944 and is known in Romanian as Cetatea Albă with other languages using the Turkish name, Akkerman, or variations of the Turkish name. Since 1944 the city has been known as "Bilhorod-Dnistrovskyi" (Білгород-Дністровський), while on Soviet geography maps it is often translated into its Russian equivalent of "Belgorod-Dnestrovskiy" (Белгород-Днестровский), literally "white city on the Dniester".

The city is known by translations of "white city" or "castle" in a number of languages including Белгород Днестровски (Belgorod-Dnestrovski) in Bulgarian, Akerman (Акерман) in Gagauz, Białogród nad Dniestrem in Polish, Walachisch Weißenburg in Transylvanian German, Dnyeszterfehérvár in Hungarian and עיר לבן (Ir Lavan) in Hebrew.

In Western European languages, including English, the city has typically been known by the official name of the time or a transliteration derived from it.

The city's former name Akkerman is still extensively used as a nickname in informal speech and in local media.

== History ==
=== Ancient and medieval period ===
Ancient Greek colonies on the northern coast of the Black Sea, 8th to 3rd century BC

In the 6th century BC, Milesian colonists founded a settlement named Tyras on the future location of Bilhorod-Dnistrovskyi, which later came under Roman and Byzantine rule. In Late Antiquity, the Byzantines built a fortress and named it Asprokastron ("White Castle" - a meaning kept in several languages), but it passed out of their control in the 7th-15th centuries under control of Bulgaria, the cities called Belgorod (white city), as it was the border of the Bulgarian empire.

Slavic tribes of Tiverians and Ulichs inhabited the region during the period of Kyivan Rus'. Between the 12th and 14th centuries the city was used as a haven by princes of Galicia. In the 13th century the site was controlled by the Cumans, and became a center of Genoese commercial activity from c. 1290 on. Briefly held by the Second Bulgarian Empire in the early 14th century, by the middle of the century it was a Genoese colony. Sfântul Ioan cel Nou (Saint John the New), the patron saint of Moldavia, was martyred in the city in 1330 during a Tatar incursion. In 1391, Cetatea Albă was the last city on the right bank of the Dnister to be incorporated into the newly established Principality of Moldova, and for the next century was its second major city, the major port and an important fortress.

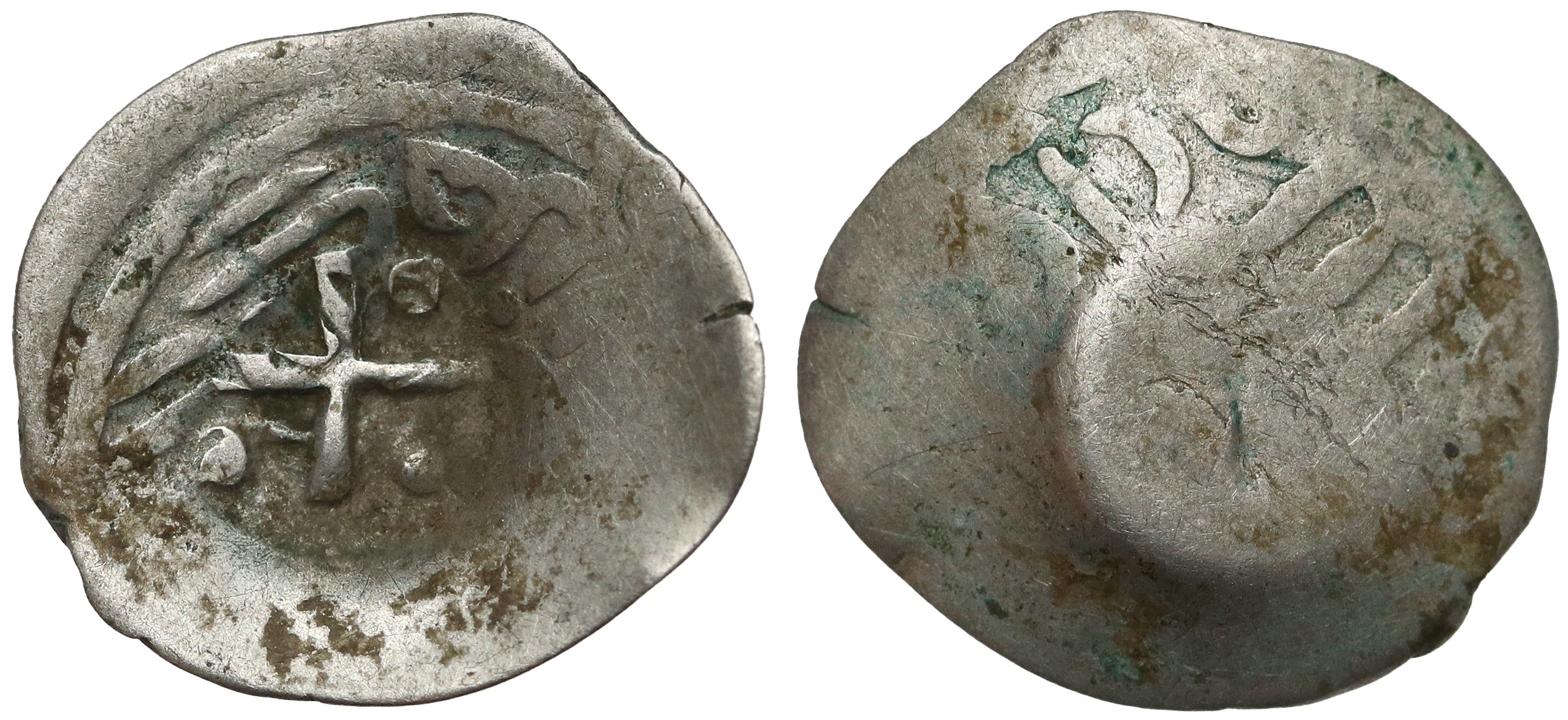
15th-century Moldavian coin from the local mint

In 1420, the citadel was attacked for the first time by the Ottomans, but defended successfully by Moldavian Prince Alexander the Kind.

In the 15th century, the port saw much commercial traffic as well as being frequently used for passenger traffic between central Europe and Constantinople. Among the travellers who passed through the town was John VIII Palaiologos.

=== Ottoman rule ===
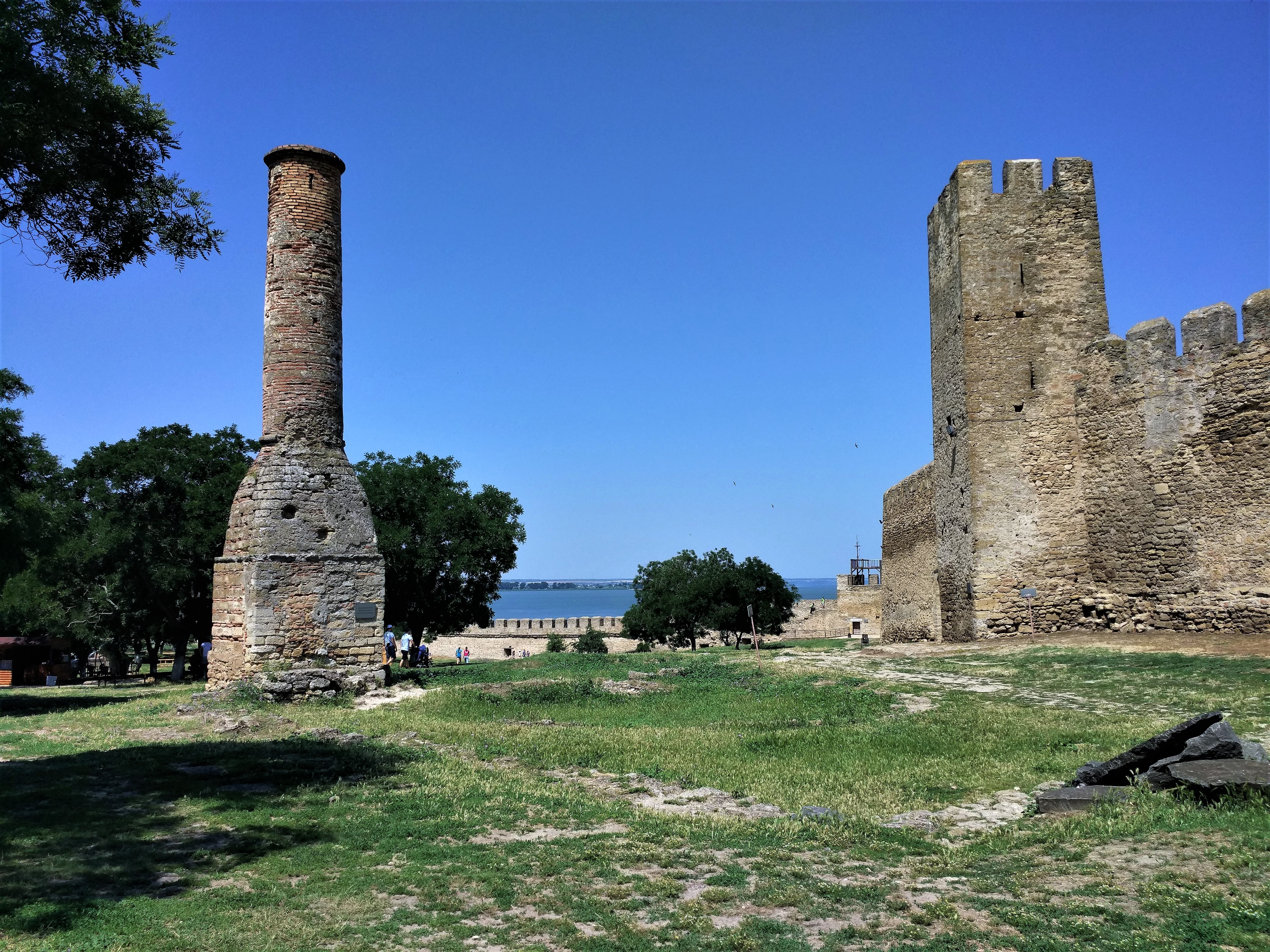
Turkish minaret near the walls of Akkerman Fortress

In 1484, along with Kiliia, Cetatea Albă was the last of the Black Sea ports to be conquered by the Ottomans. The Moldavian prince Stephen the Great was unable to aid in its defence, being under threat of a Polish invasion. The citadel surrendered when the Ottomans claimed to have reached an agreement with Prince Stephen, and promised safe passage to the inhabitants and their belongings; however, most of the city-dwellers were slaughtered. Later, attempts by Stephen the Great to restore his rule over the area were unsuccessful. Cetatea Albă was subsequently a base from which the Ottomans were able to attack Moldavia proper. In 1485, Tatars setting out from this city founded Pazardzhik in Bulgaria. In 1570 (Hijri 977) the town of Akkerman was inhabited by Muslims, Christians and Jews. It had 55 Muslim households in 25 neighbourhoods and 113 Non-Muslim households in 9 neighbourhoods and it was a "has" of the Sultan, a land property that was directly owned by the Sultan. The castle of Akkerman also had a Jewish congregation and a Roma congregation.

Following the Fall of Constantinople to the Ottomans in 1453, Sultan Mehmed II brought in colonists from Asprokastron to repopulate the city. It was established as the fortress of Akkerman, part of the Ottoman defensive system against Poland-Lithuania and, later, the Russian Empire.

In 1561 Akkerman, known in Ukrainian as Bilhorod, was mentioned as a residence of "Tatar Cossacks", who were hired into the service of Kaniv starost, prince Michał Wiśniowiecki. Under the Ottoman rule the city served as an important centre of Black Sea slave trade promoted by Crimean khans from the Giray dynasty. In 1516 the city was attacked by Zaporozhian Cossacks under the command of Przecław Lanckoroński and Ostap Dashkevych. Between 1540 and 1561 Akkerman was targeted in a series of punitive raids organized by Bar starost Bernard Pretwicz as an answer to Tatar raids against the Polish Kingdom. During the 1570s raids against the fortress continued, despite a ban introduced on the Cossacks by Polish authorities.

Following the liquidation of the Zaporozhian Sich, Akkerman served as a transit point for Zaporozhian Cossacks who didn't wish to serve the Russian Empire and migrated to Ottoman territories, establishing the Danube Sich.

=== Russian rule ===
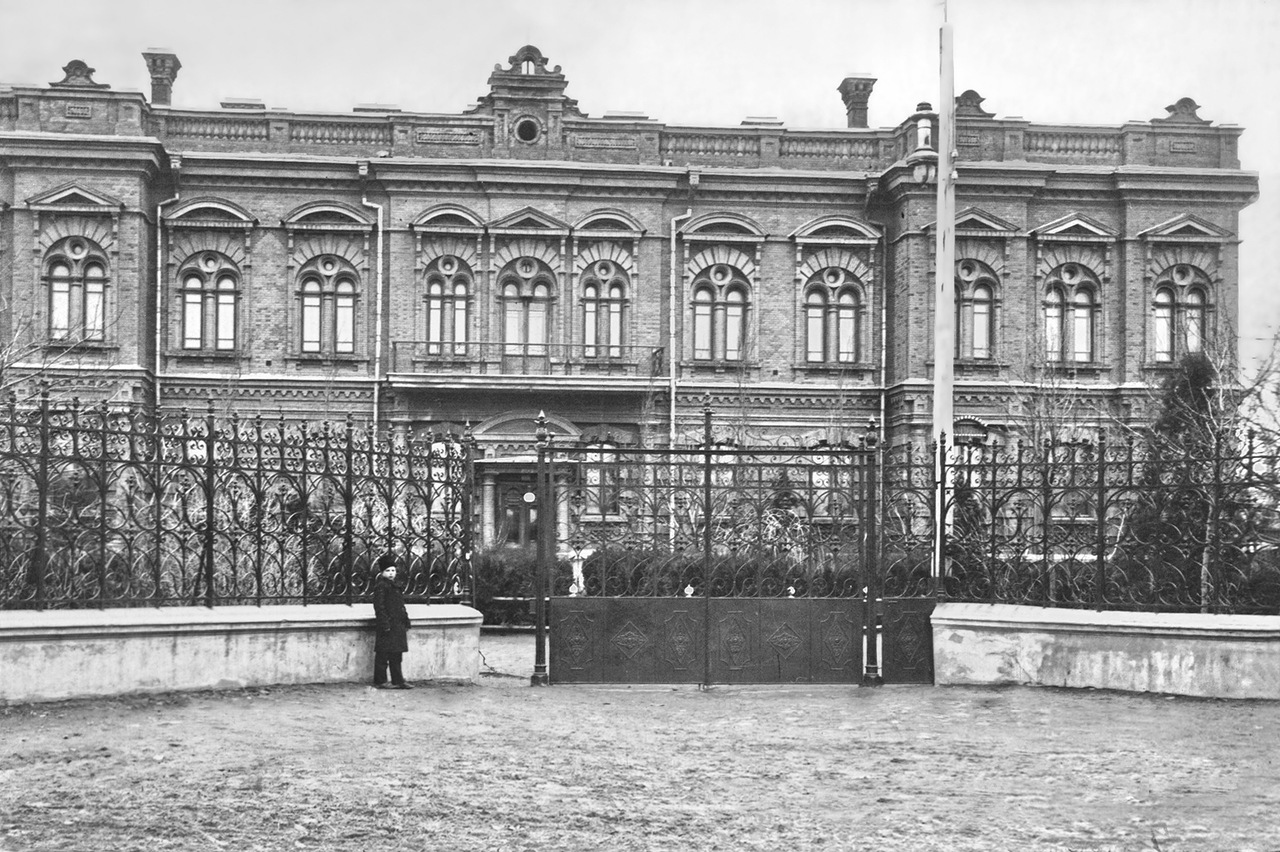
County office in c. 1895

Major battles between the Ottomans and the Russians were fought near Akkerman in 1770 and 1789. Russia conquered the town in 1770, 1774, and 1806, but returned it after the conclusion of hostilities. It was not incorporated into Russia until 1812, when it was annexed, along with the rest of Bessarabia.

On 25 September 1826, Russia and the Ottomans signed here the Akkerman Convention which imposed that the hospodars of Moldavia and Wallachia be elected by their respective Divans for seven-year terms, with the approval of both Powers.

Under the Russian rule, many Ukrainians fleeing serfdom in their native lands moved to Bessarabia and settled in the area of Akkerman. Their fate was depicted by Ukrainian writer Ivan Nechuy-Levytsky in his novel Mykola Dzheria. According to the 1897 Russian census, Akkerman povit had a population of 265,247 inhabitants, of whom 26,29% were Ukrainians, 21,32% Bulgarians, 16,38% Moldovans, 16,36% Germans, 9,62% Russians, 4,63% Jews, 3,91% Gagauz people, 0,42% Romani, 0,25% Armenians and 0,11% Poles.

=== Romanian rule ===
The city and the surrounding district became part of the Moldovan Democratic Republic after it proclaimed its independence following the Russian Revolution. The Romanian Army, entered the city on 9 March 1918, fighting with local troops led by the Bolsheviks. Formal integration followed later that month, when the 'Sfatul Țării' of the Moldovan Democratic Republic proclaimed the whole of Bessarabia united with Romania.

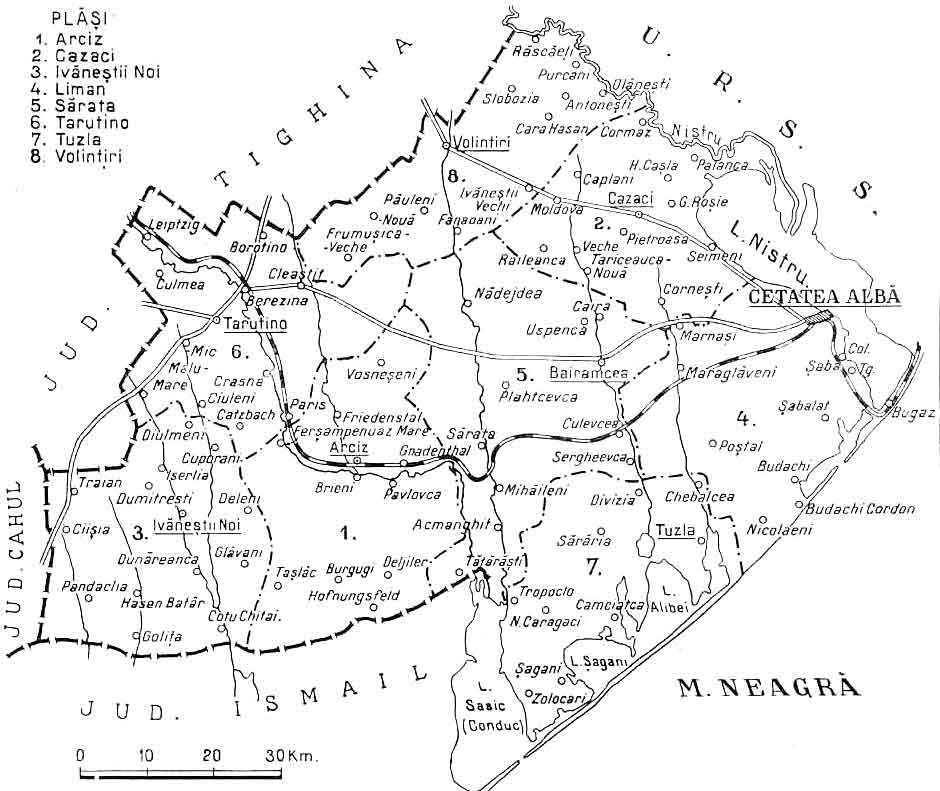
1938 map of the interwar Romanian county of Cetatea Albă

During the interwar period, the Romanian administration transformed Cetatea-Albă into an important administrative and cultural center of Greater Romania. The city was modernized through the restoration of historic buildings and the construction of new ones in modern styles, such as Neoromanian and Neoclassical. Infrastructure works were carried out, including street paving, the construction of bridges and roads, as well as the development of parks and recreational areas.

Urban development plans included the creation of new neighborhoods and improvements to infrastructure, making the city more functional and pleasant for its inhabitants.

During the Interwar period the city was a centre of Ukrainian cultural life in Southern Bessarabia. In 1941 among 37,000 inhabitants 37% identified as ethnic Ukrainians. In 1936 a Prosvita society was established in the city.

=== Soviet rule ===
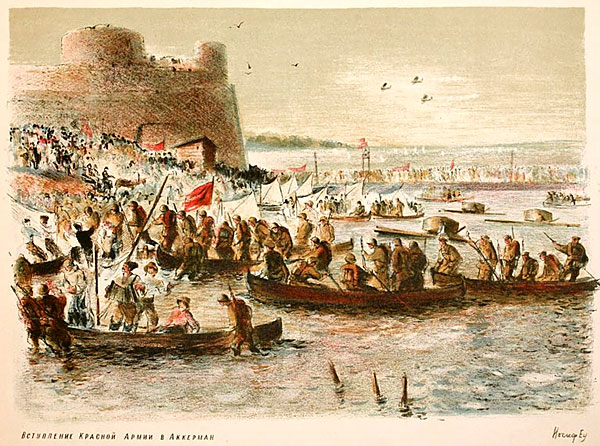
Entry of the Red Army in Akkerman painted by Iosif Yets, 1940

Romania ceded the city to the Soviet Union on 28 June 1940 following the 1940 Soviet occupation of Bessarabia, that year the name was officially changed to 'Belgorod-Dniestrovski'. Soviet authorities disbanded the local Ukrainian Prosvita society, arresting its members, some of whom were later executed or went missing.

The Romanian state regained it on 28 July 1941 during the invasion of the USSR by the Axis forces in the course of the Second World War and had it within its boundaries until 22 August 1944 when the Red Army reoccupied the city. The Soviets partitioned Bessarabia, creating the Moldovian SSR, taking away its southern flanks and sea access, including Belgorod, which became part of the Ukrainian SSR, and after 1991 Ukraine.

Following the end of the war, Bilhorod-Dnistrovskyi developed as a small port and a naval service station, with local industry being based on fish processing. Important role in the area continued to be played by fishing and viticulture. Several schools and a teachers' institute were active. The biggest ethnic groups inhabiting the city were Ukrainians, Moldovans, Russians and Bulgarians.

=== Modern times ===
Until 18 July 2020, Bilhorod-Dnistrovskyi was incorporated as a city of oblast significance and the center of Bilhorod-Dnistrovskyi Municipality. The municipality was abolished in July 2020 as part of the administrative reform of Ukraine, which reduced the number of raions of Odesa Oblast to seven. The area of Bilhorod-Dnistrovskyi Municipality was merged into Bilhorod-Dnistrovskyi Raion.

=== Jewish history ===
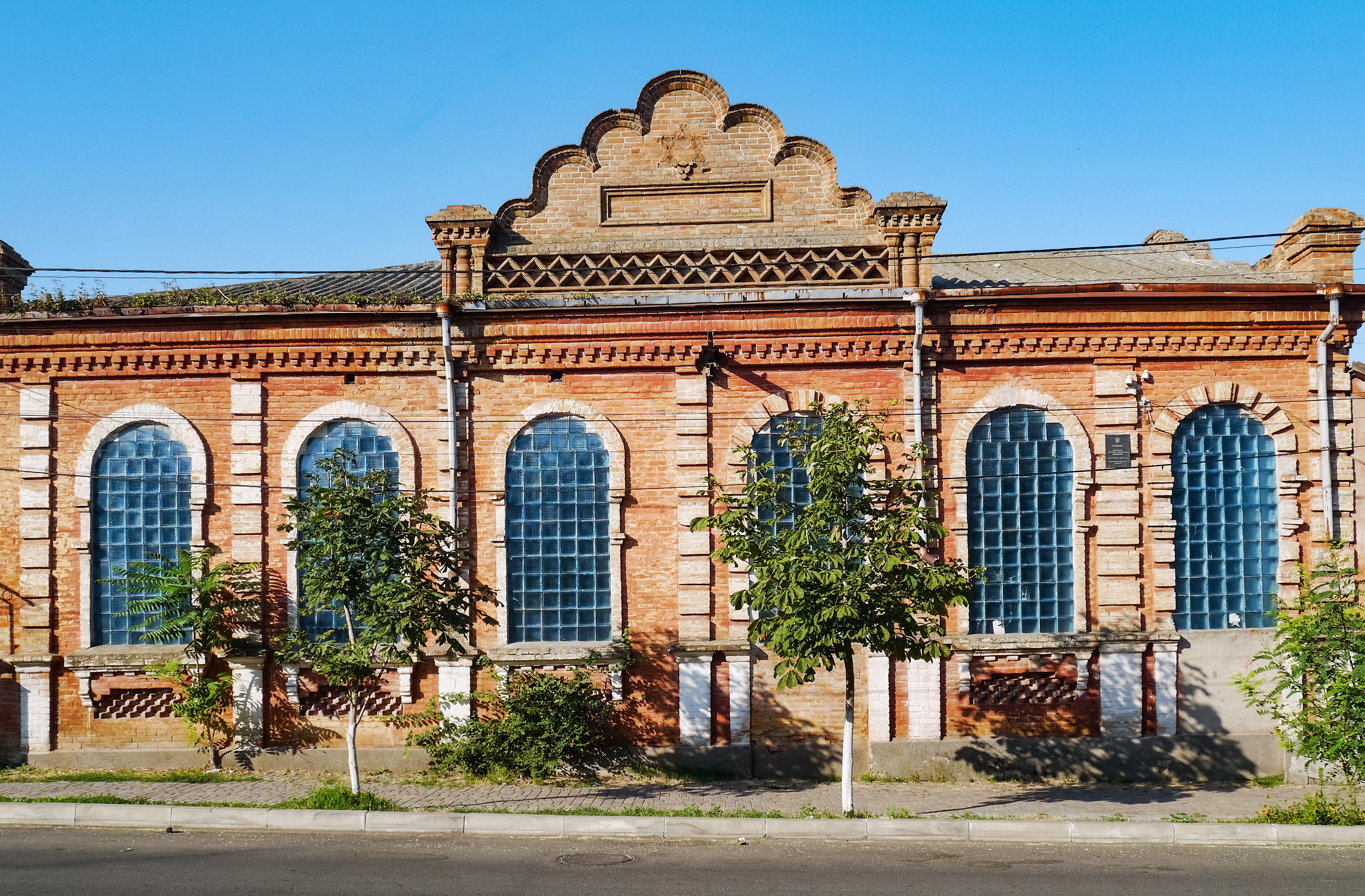
Bilhorod-Dnistrovskyi Synagogue

In Jewish sources, the city is referred as Weissenburg and Ir Lavan (meaning "white castle" in German and "white city" in Hebrew) as well as Akerman (אַקערמאַן). Karaite Jews lived there since the 16th century, some even claim the existence of Khazar Jews in the town as early as the 10th century. In 1897, 5,613 Jews lived in the city (19.9% of the total population). The town Jewish community was influenced mainly from the Jewish community of nearby Odesa. During a pogrom in 1905, eight Jews living in the city were killed. During World War II, most of the Jews living in the city fled to nearby Odesa, where they were later killed. About 800 Jews who were left in the city were shot to death in the nearby Leman River. The Yad Vashem website provides the names of 798 Jews who were killed during the Holocaust in the city and the neighborhood. The remaining Jews were deported to Transnistria by the Romanian Fascist authorities later in 1941, where a large majority of them died. The number of Jews from the city who died in Ukraine according to the Yad Vashem website was 869. Out of these, 662 died in Odessa, while the rest were mostly deportees to Transnistria. The number of Jews who were registered following their evacuation in the interior of the Soviet Union whose names were listed by Yad Vashem was 1,465. Around half of the survivors returned to the city.

== Demographics ==
In 1919, an US officer estimated the population to 35,000, of which he believed 8,000 were Romanian, 8,000 were Jewish, and 5,000 were German. Additional populations included Turks, Greeks, Bulgarians and Russians. According to the 1930 Romanian census, the population of the broader Cetatea Alba County consisted of around 30% Russians, 30% Ukrainians and smaller Romanian and Jewish communities.

According to the 2001 Ukrainian census, the majority of the city's population are Ukrainians (62.88%). Other communities include Russians (28.25%), Bulgarians (3.72%), Moldovans (1.89%), Gagauz (0.41%) and Romanians (0.02%). The language situation is notably different, with self-identified Russian-speakers representing a majority (54.52%), followed by speakers of Ukrainian (42.08%), Bulgarian (1.66%), Moldovan (Romanian) (0.67%) and Gagauz (0.19%).

== Geography ==
=== Climate ===
Bilhorod-Dnistrovskyi has a humid continental climate (Köppen: Dfb bordering on Dfa).

Climate data for Bilhorod-Dnistrovskyi
Month	Jan	Feb	Mar	Apr	May	Jun	Jul	Aug	Sep	Oct	Nov	Dec	Year
Mean daily maximum °C (°F)	1.5 (34.7)	2.1 (35.8)	5.9 (42.6)	12.9 (55.2)	19.1 (66.4)	23.5 (74.3)	25.9 (78.6)	25.5 (77.9)	21.2 (70.2)	15.1 (59.2)	8.9 (48.0)	4.4 (39.9)	13.8 (56.9)
Daily mean °C (°F)	−1.1 (30.0)	−0.4 (31.3)	3.1 (37.6)	9.6 (49.3)	15.6 (60.1)	19.7 (67.5)	21.9 (71.4)	21.5 (70.7)	17.3 (63.1)	11.6 (52.9)	6.1 (43.0)	1.8 (35.2)	10.6 (51.1)
Mean daily minimum °C (°F)	−3.7 (25.3)	−2.9 (26.8)	0.4 (32.7)	6.4 (43.5)	12.1 (53.8)	16.0 (60.8)	17.9 (64.2)	17.5 (63.5)	13.5 (56.3)	8.2 (46.8)	3.4 (38.1)	−0.7 (30.7)	7.3 (45.2)
Average precipitation mm (inches)	35 (1.4)	36 (1.4)	27 (1.1)	31 (1.2)	39 (1.5)	48 (1.9)	49 (1.9)	36 (1.4)	38 (1.5)	25 (1.0)	38 (1.5)	42 (1.7)	444 (17.5)
Source: Climate-Data.org

== Notable people ==
- Nicolas Astrinidis (1921–2010), Romanian composer
- Vitaliy Barvinenko (born 1981), Ukrainian politician and former member of parliament
- Elena Cernei (1924–2000), Romanian opera singer
- Mihail Crama (1923–1994), Romanian poet and prose writer
- Veronika Habelok (born 2001), Ukrainian gymnast and hand-balancer.
- Oleksiy Kikireshko (born 1977), Ukrainian rally driver
- German Konovalov (1882–1936), major general of the White Movement
- Vyacheslav Leshchuk (1951), Ukrainian football player and manager
- Boris Levenson (1884–1947), Russian composer and conductor
- Vasyl Lomachenko (born 1988), Ukrainian professional boxer
- Vladyslav Lupashko (born 1986), Ukrainian football player, coach and manager
- Jacques Roitfeld (1889–1999), French film producer
- Porfiriy Stamatov (1840–1925), Minister of Justice of Bulgaria (1881)
- Tamara Tchinarova (1919–2017), ballet dancer
- Nicolae Văcăroiu (born 1943), former Prime Minister of Romania
- Osip Yermansky (1867–1941), Menshevik economist

== Sister cities ==
- TUR Fethiye, Turkey
- ARM Vagharshapat, Armenia

== Gallery ==
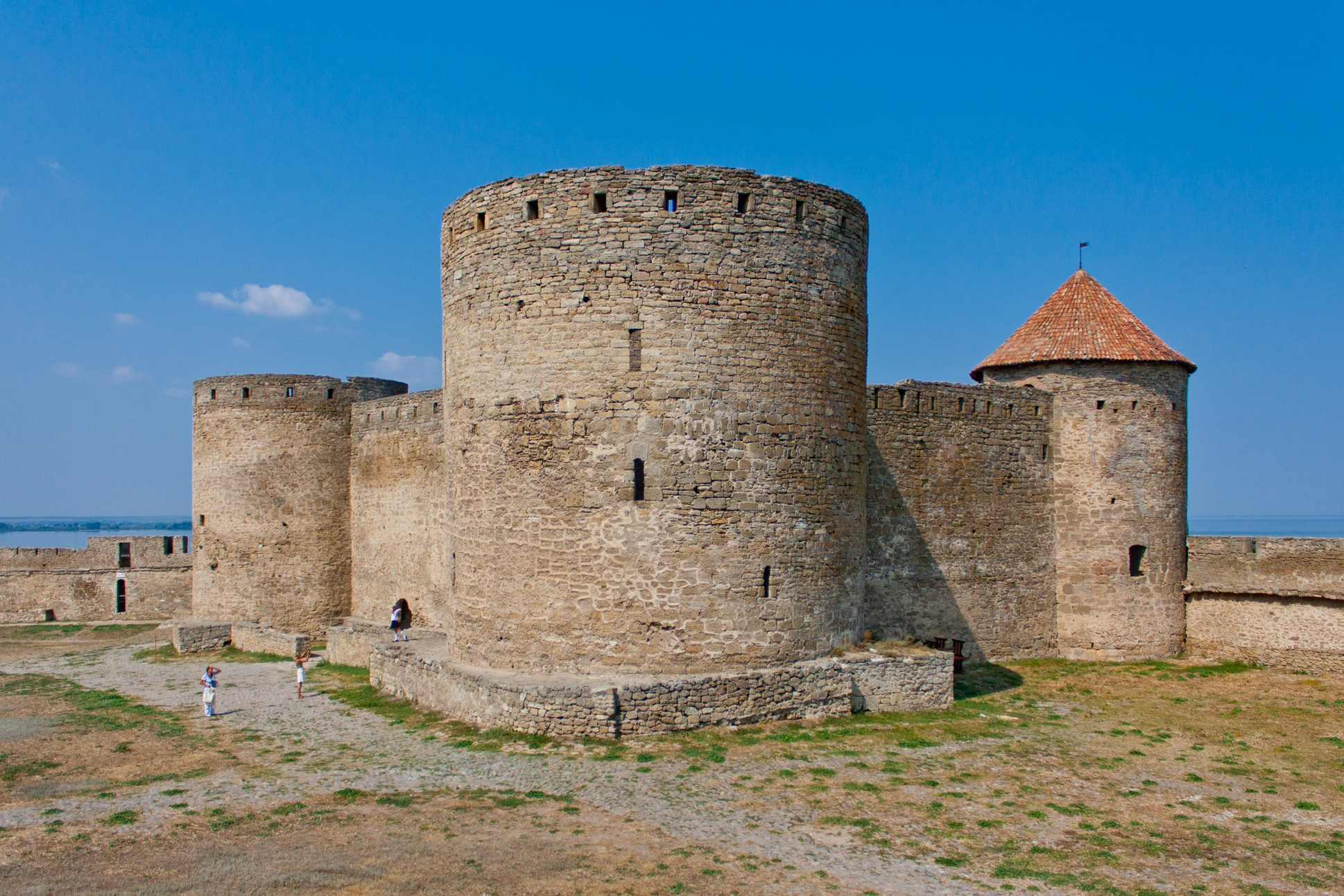
The citadel of Akkerman fortress (13th–14th centuries)

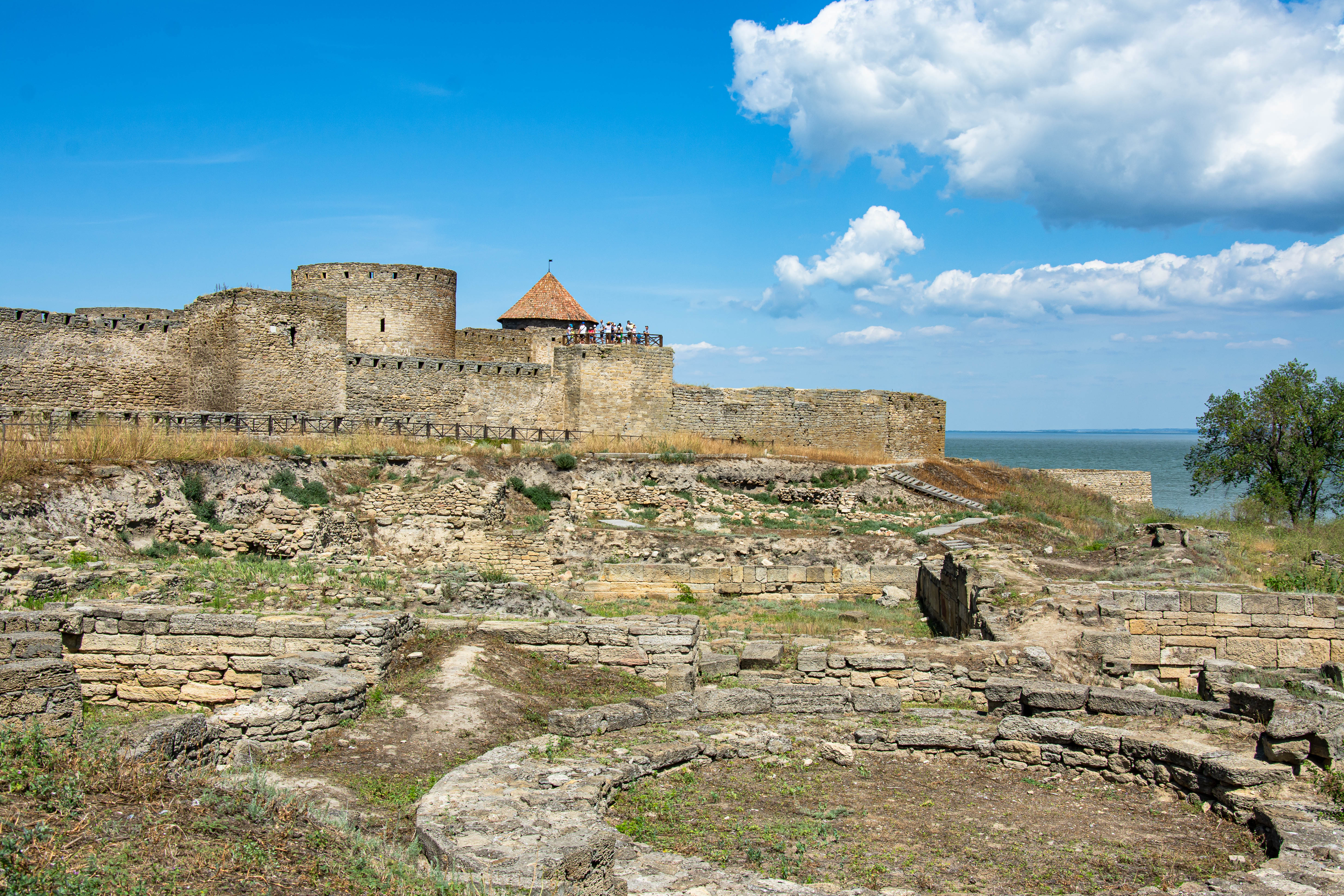
The excavations of Tyras (6th century BC – 4th century AD)

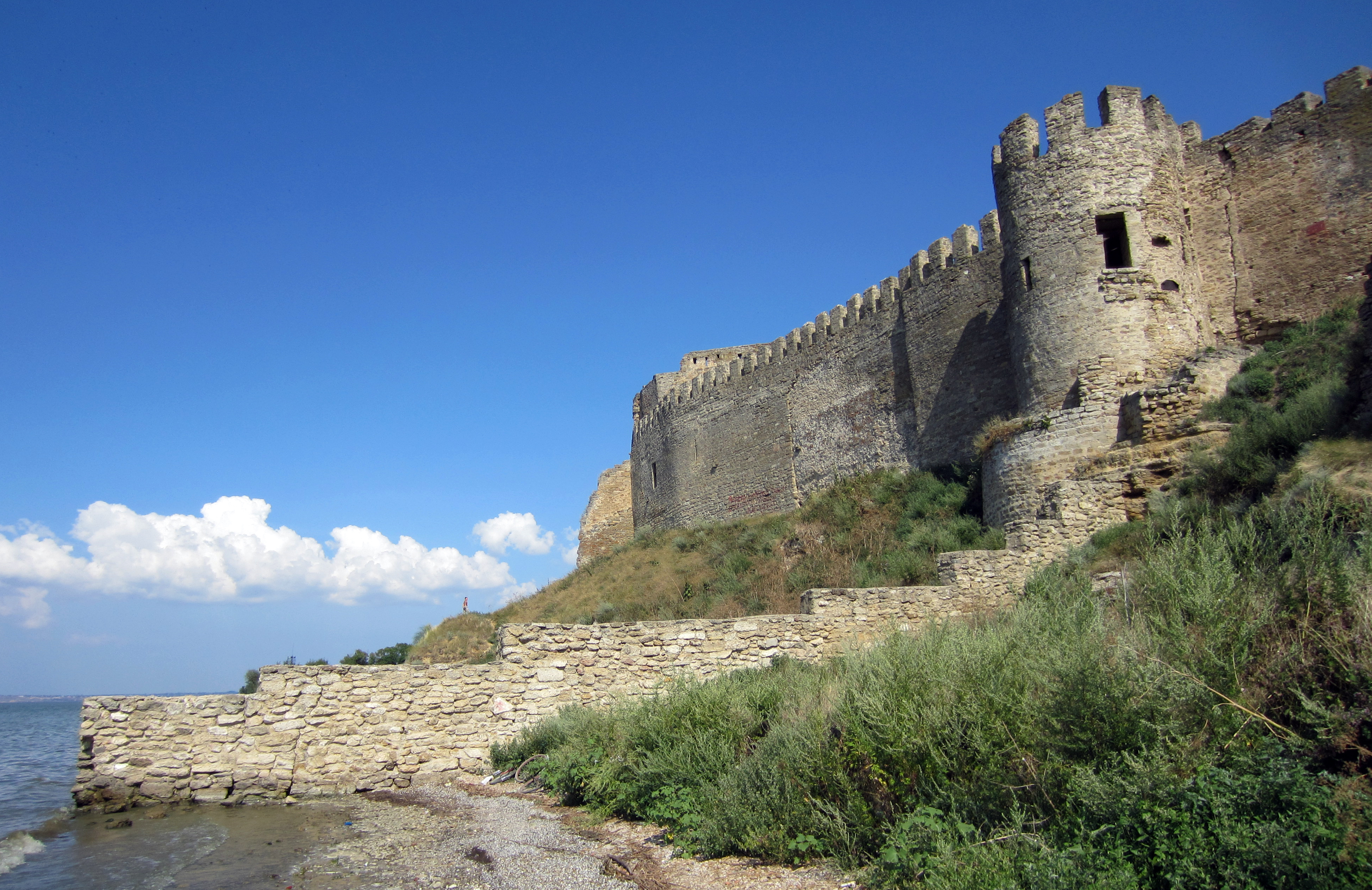
View of the fortress from the sea

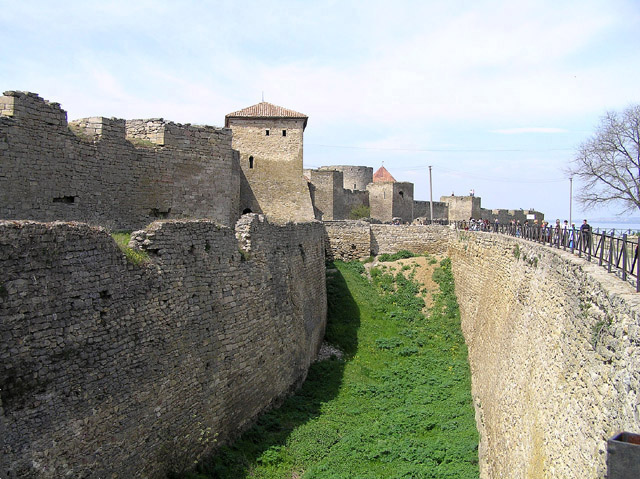
The walls of the fortress (15th–18th centuries)

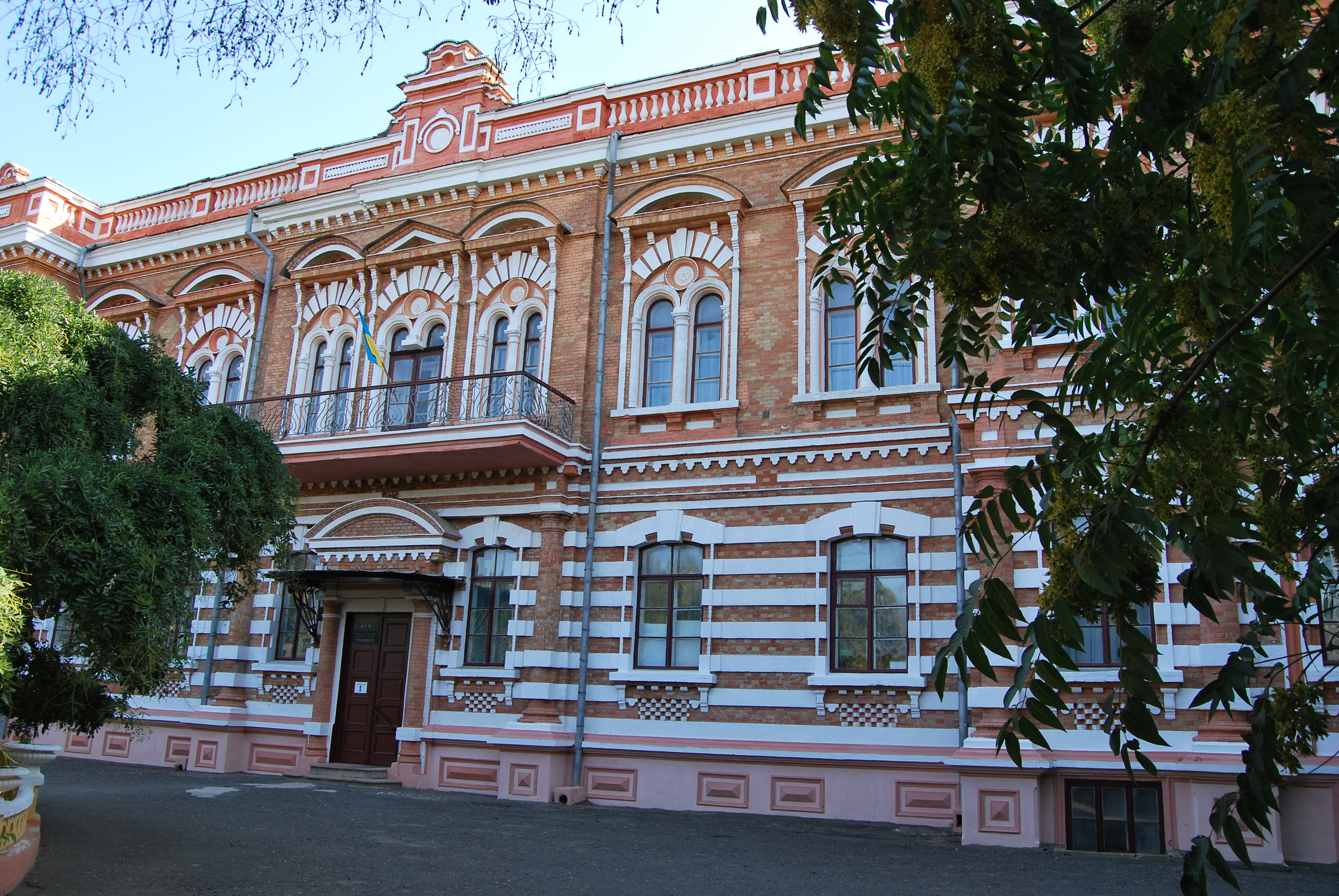
High school building

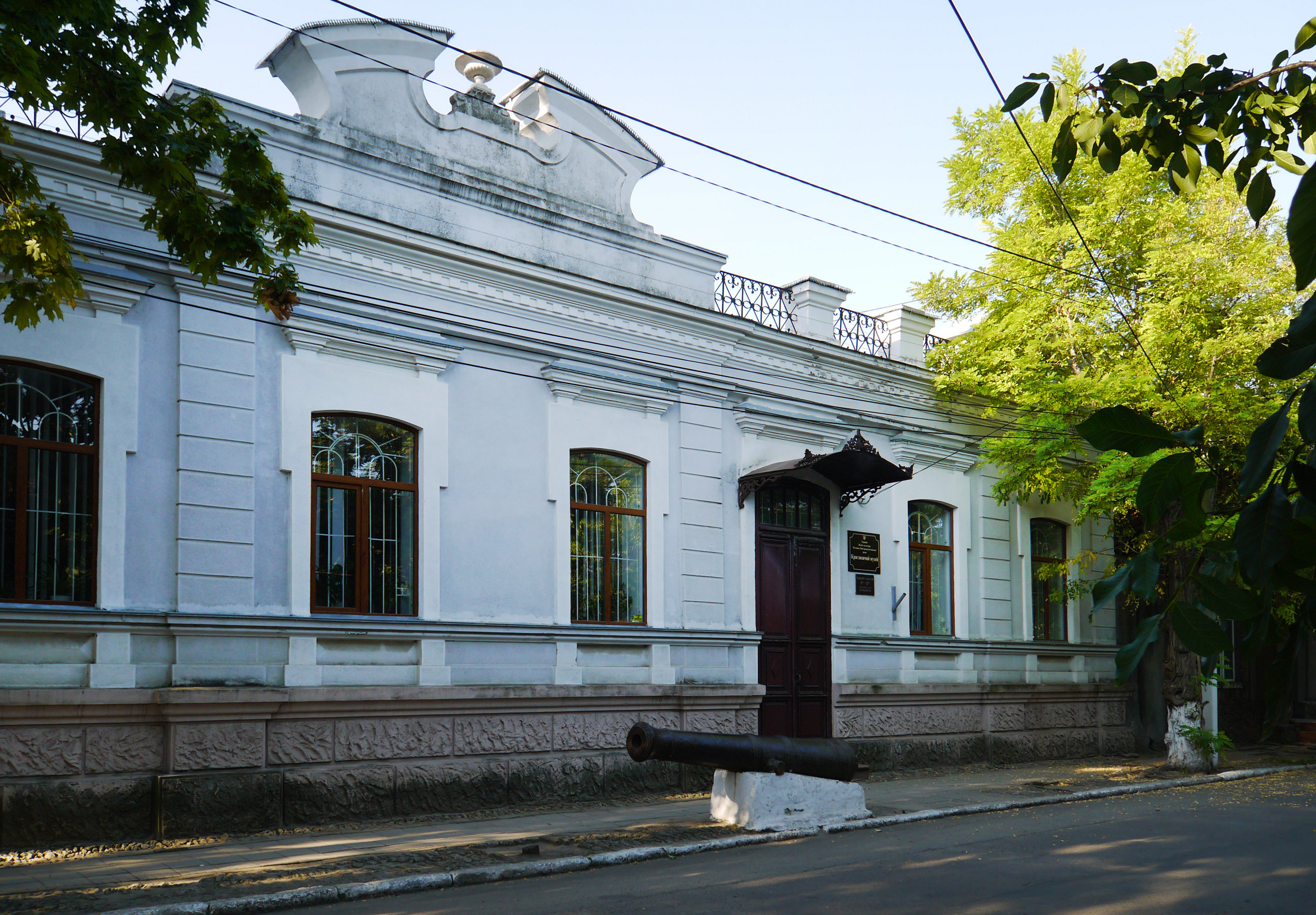
Local museum

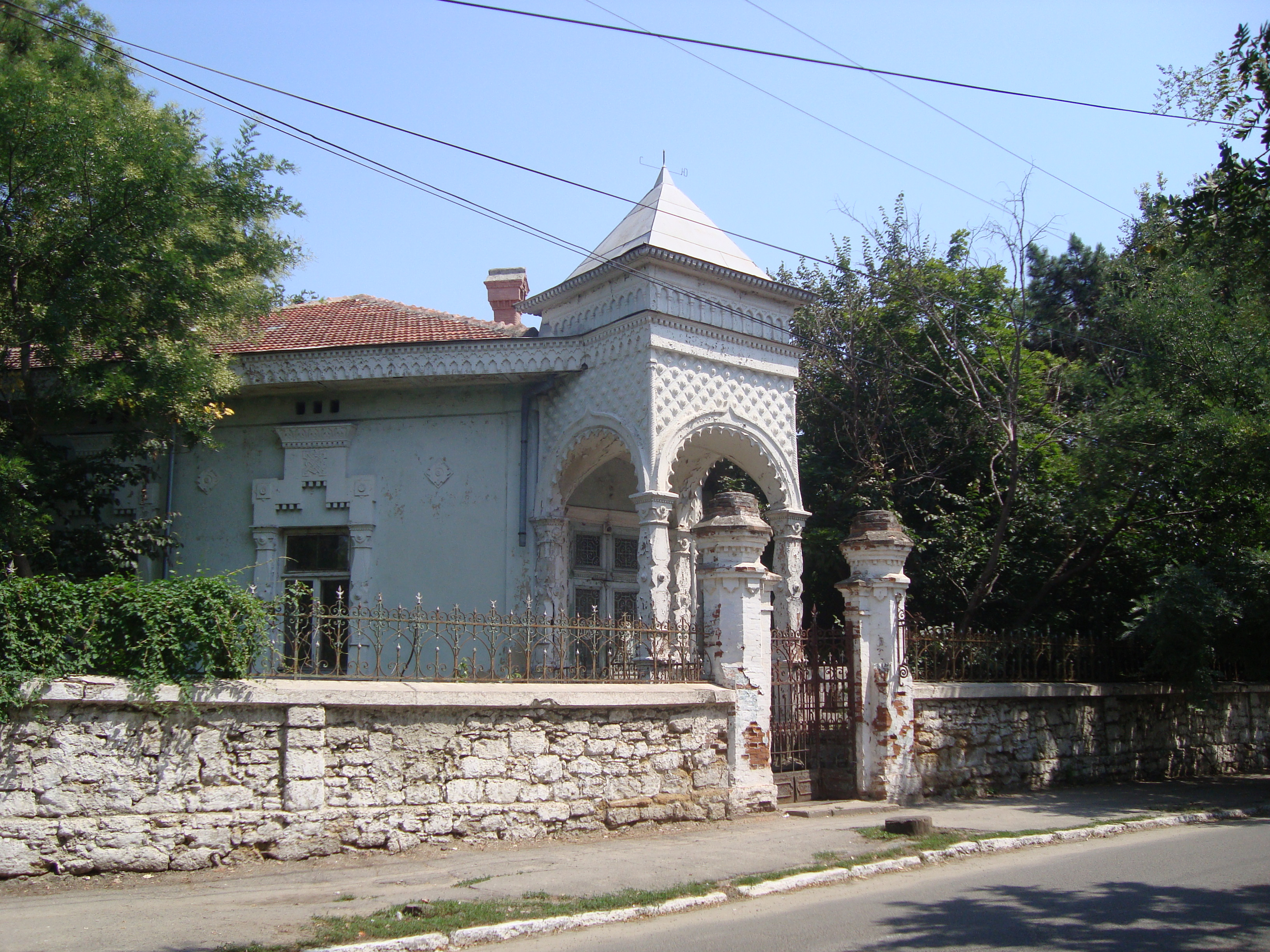
Jaroszewicz Manor

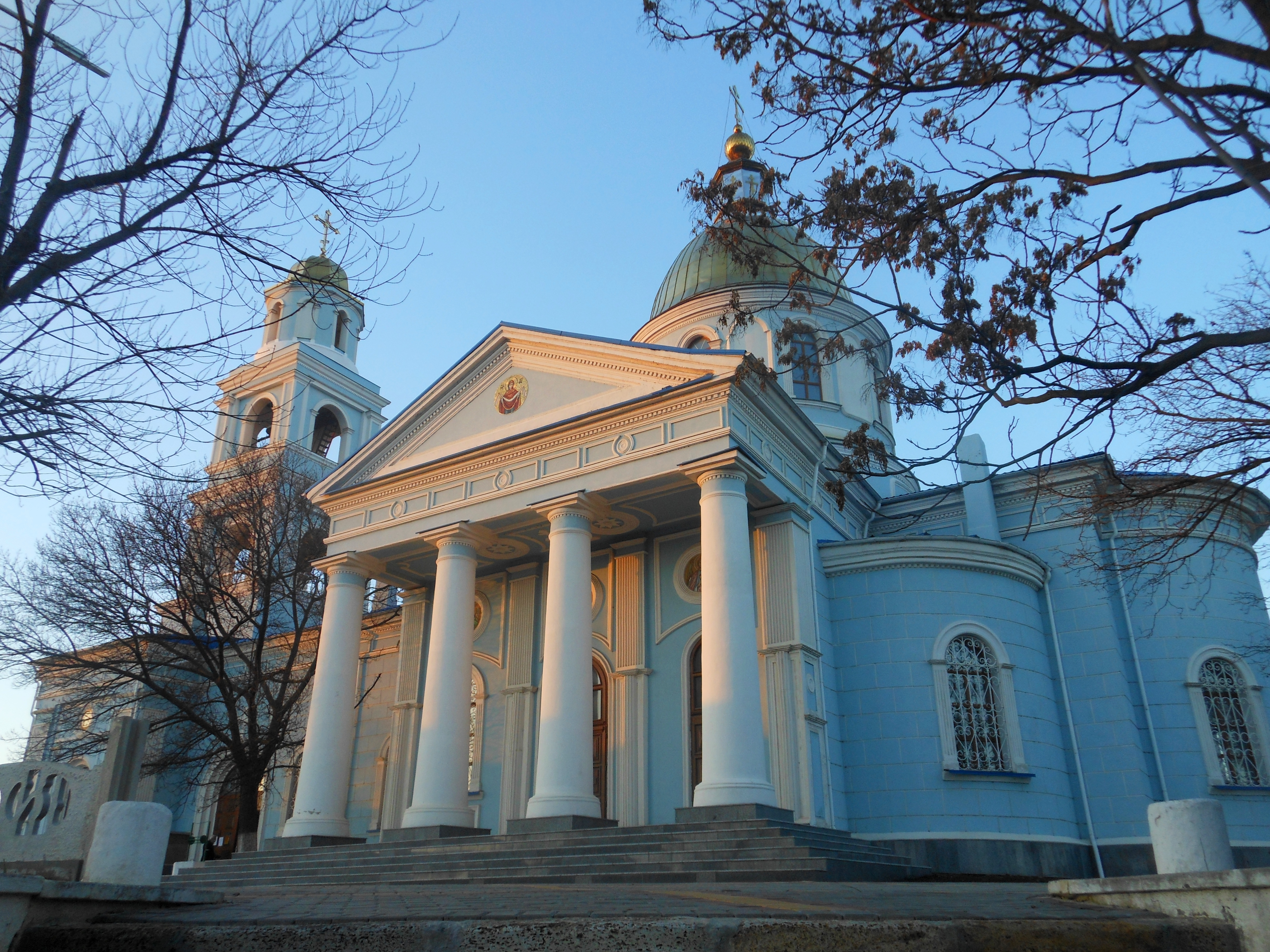
Ascension Cathedral

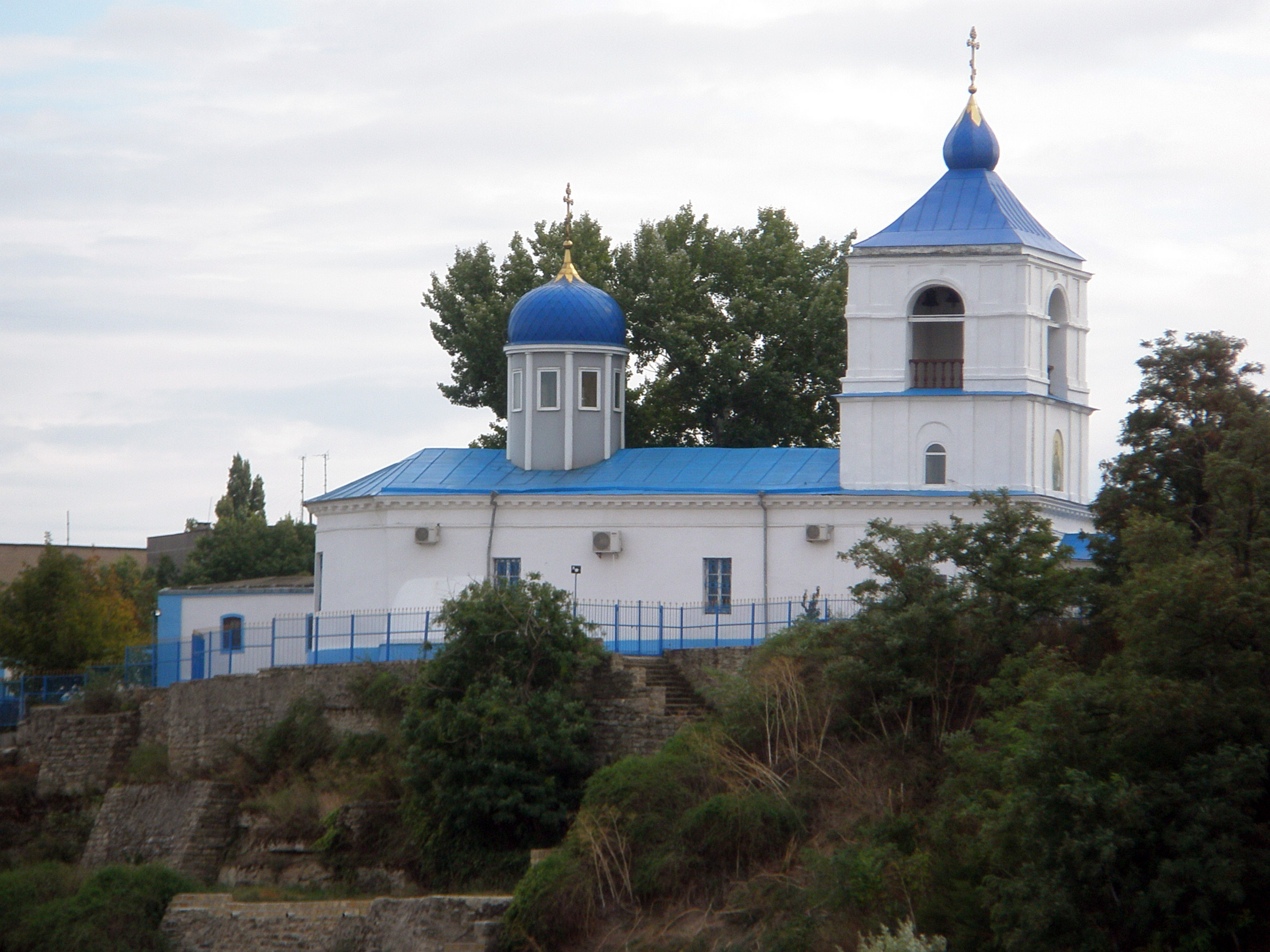
St. John Church

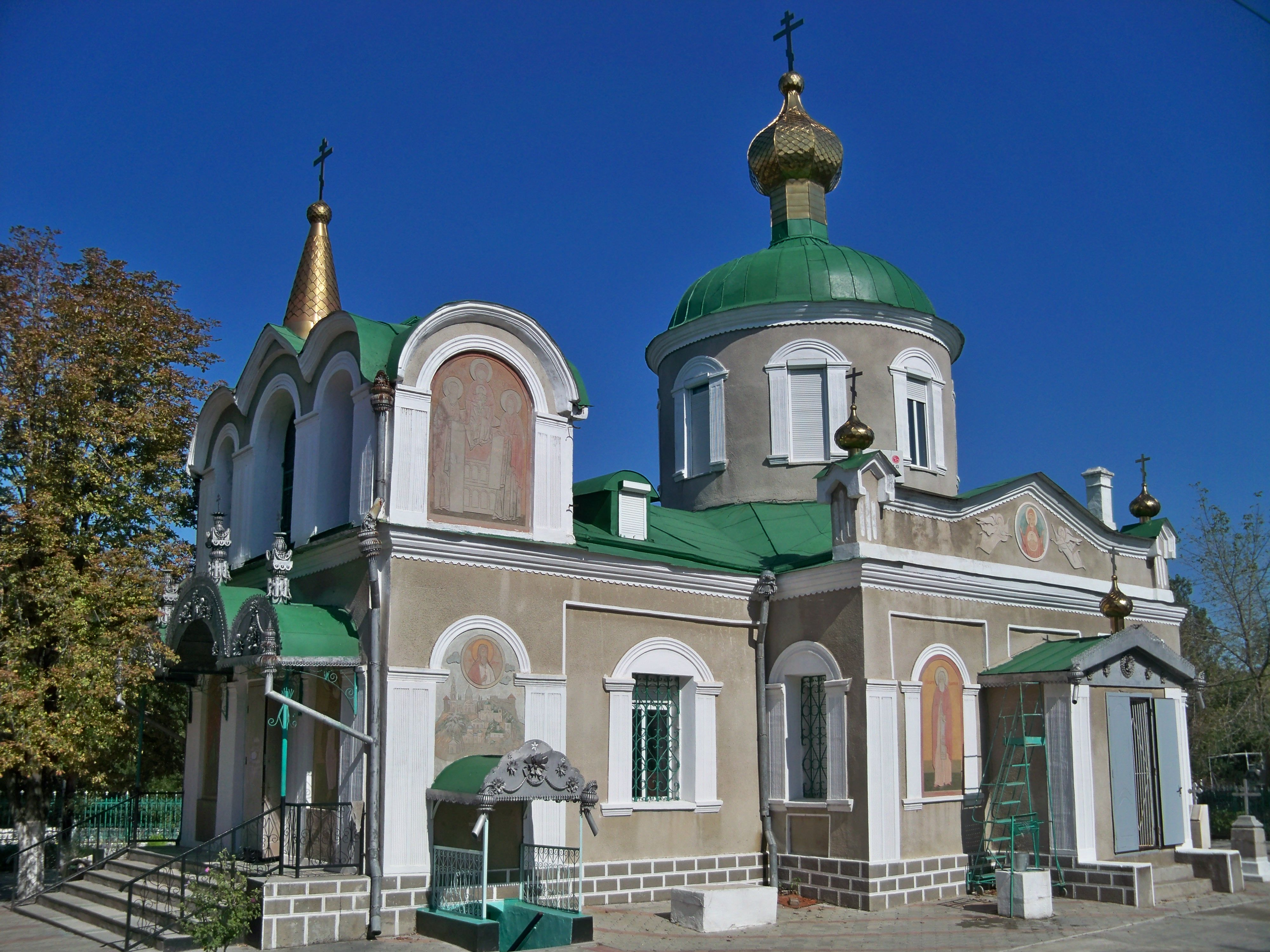
St. Nicholas Church

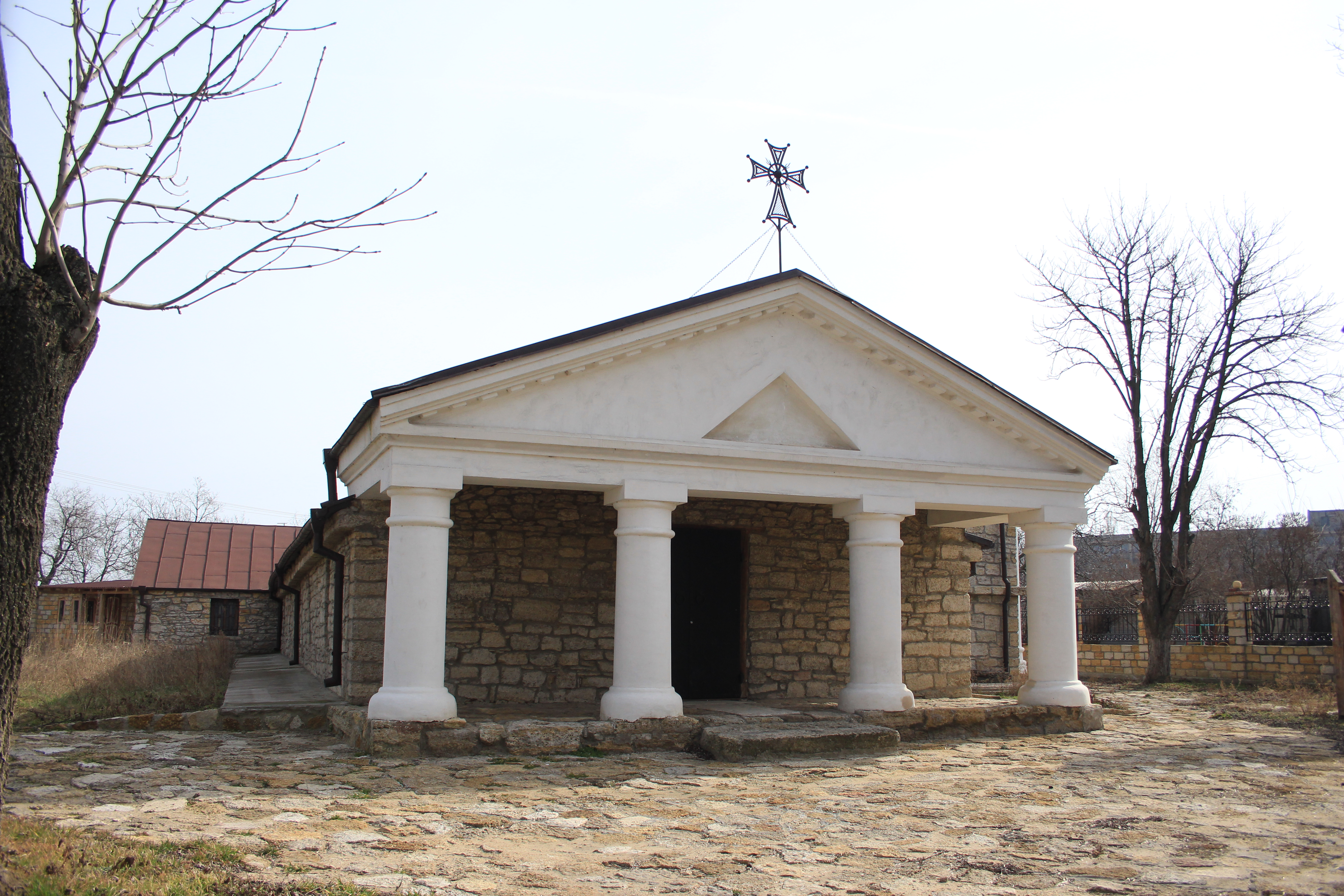
Armenian Dormition Church (14th century)

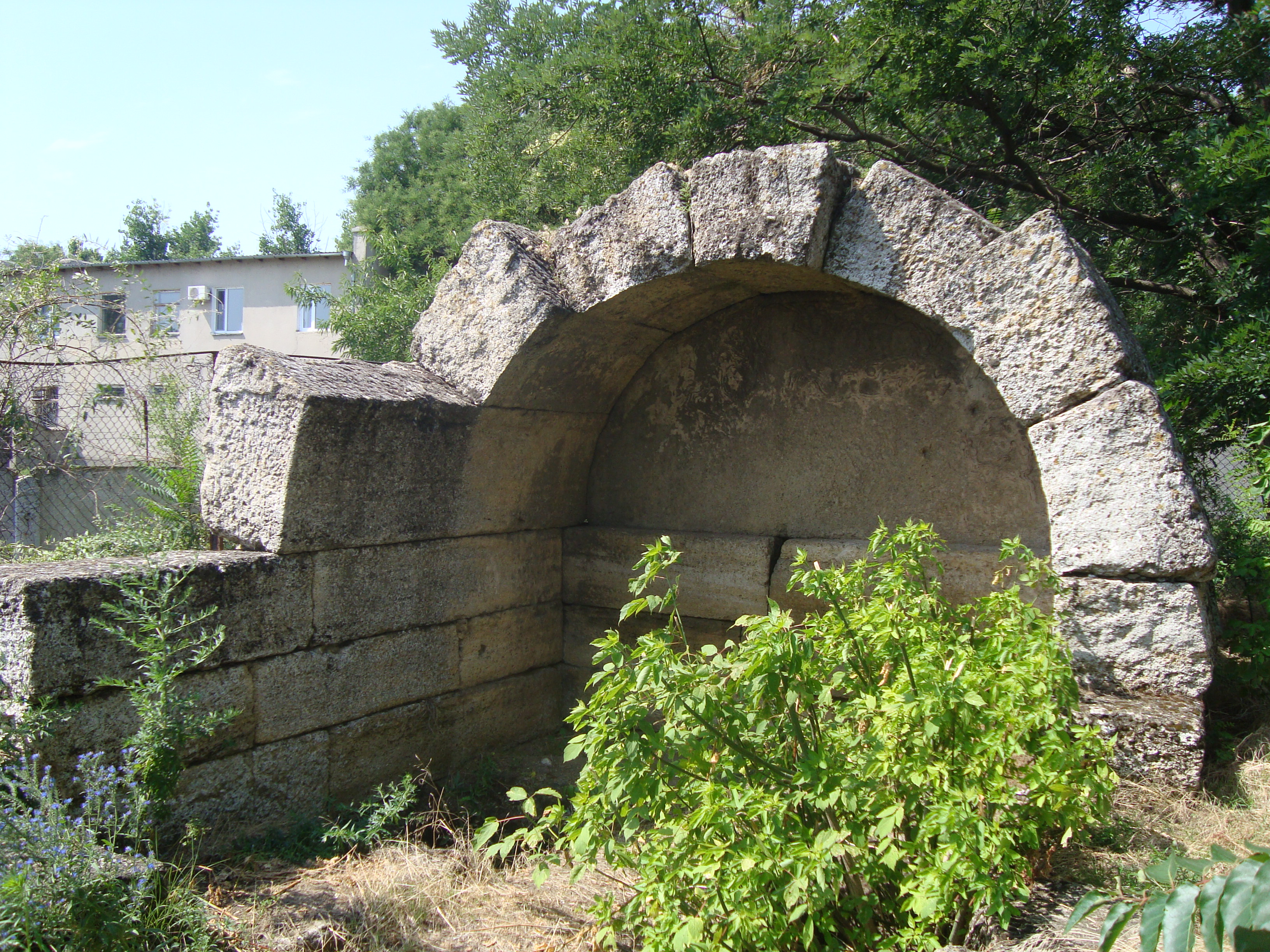
Scythian Grave (4th–3rd centuries BC)

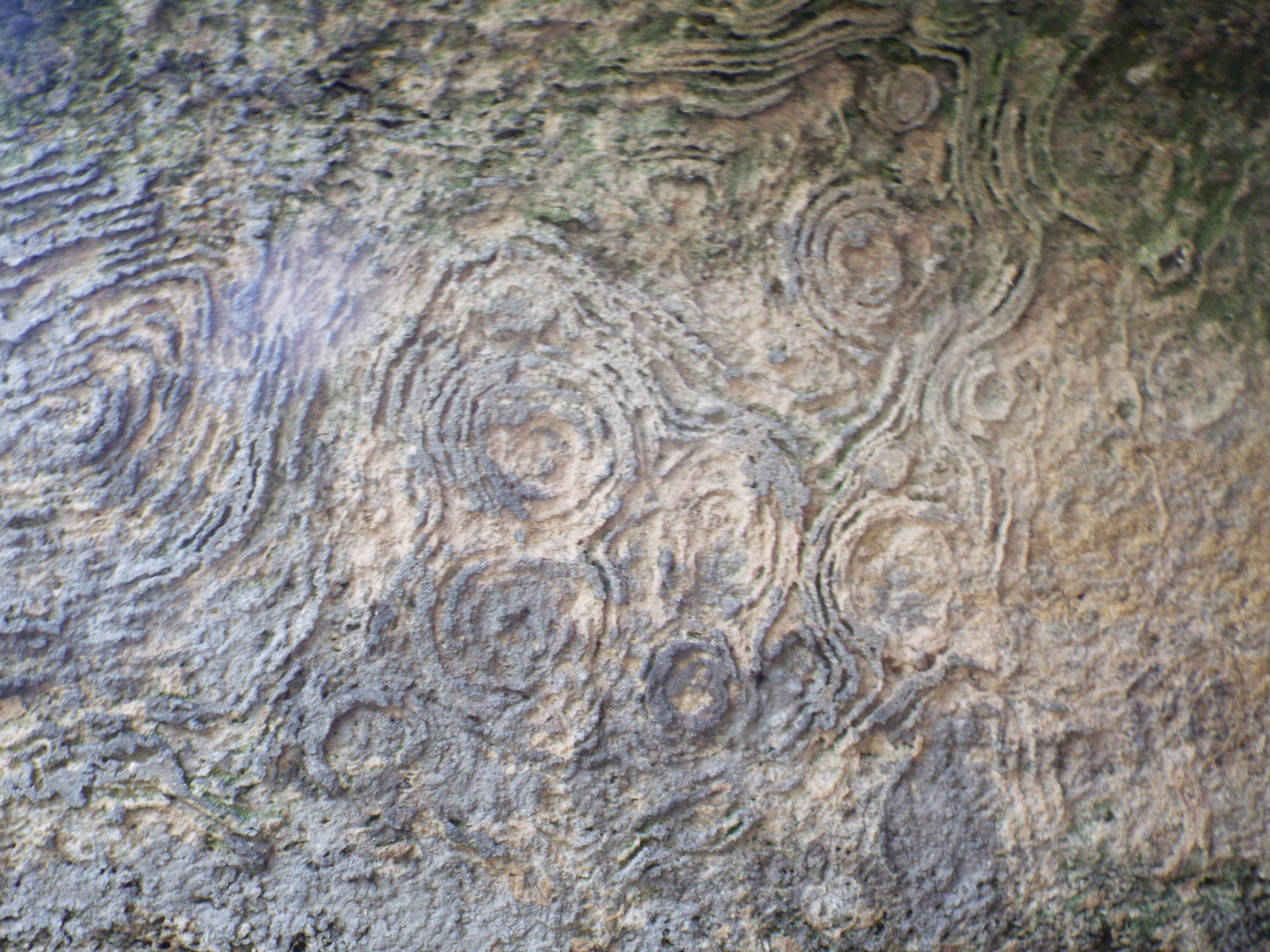
Ornament on the Scythian Grave's interior

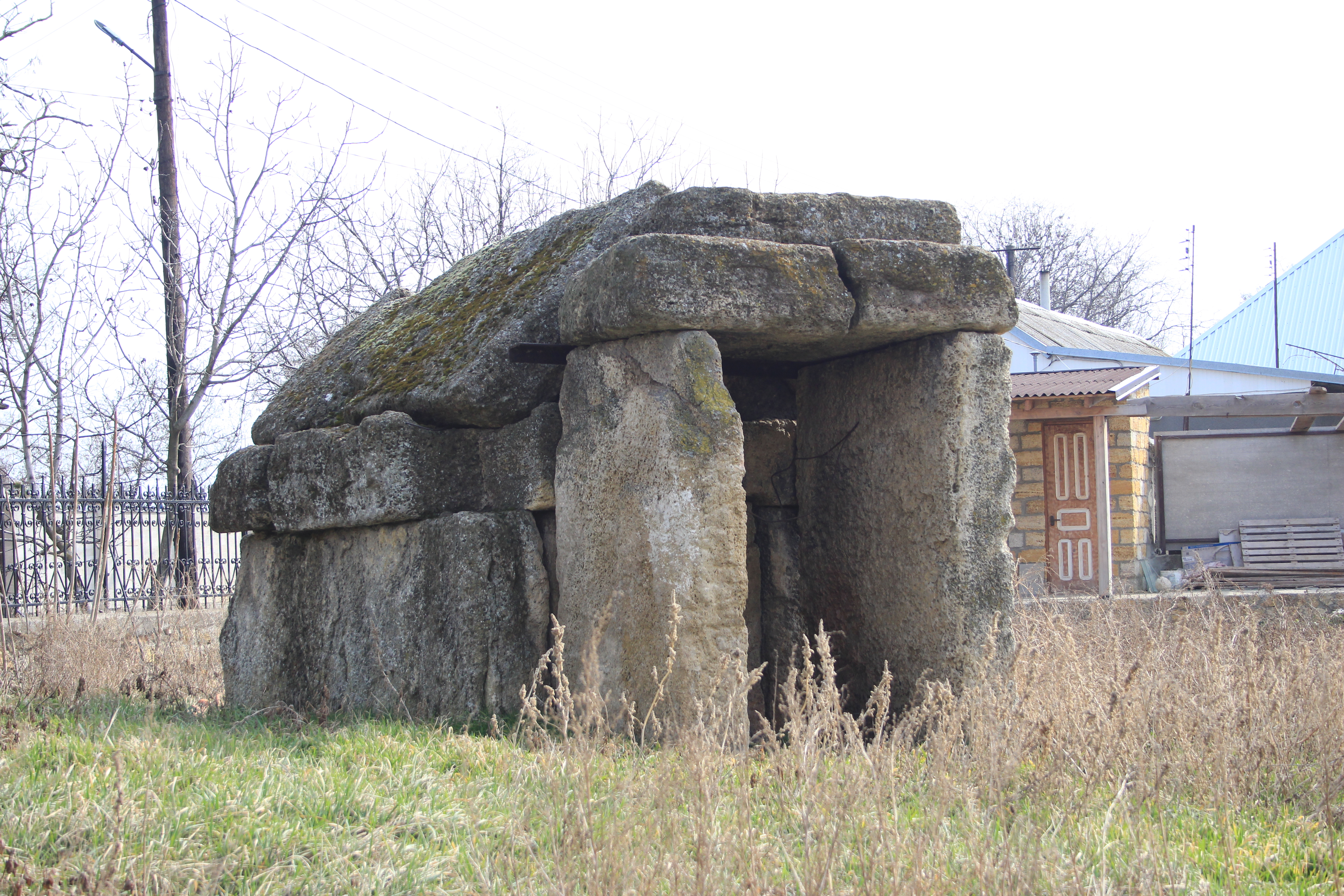
Sarmatian Crypt (3rd century BC)

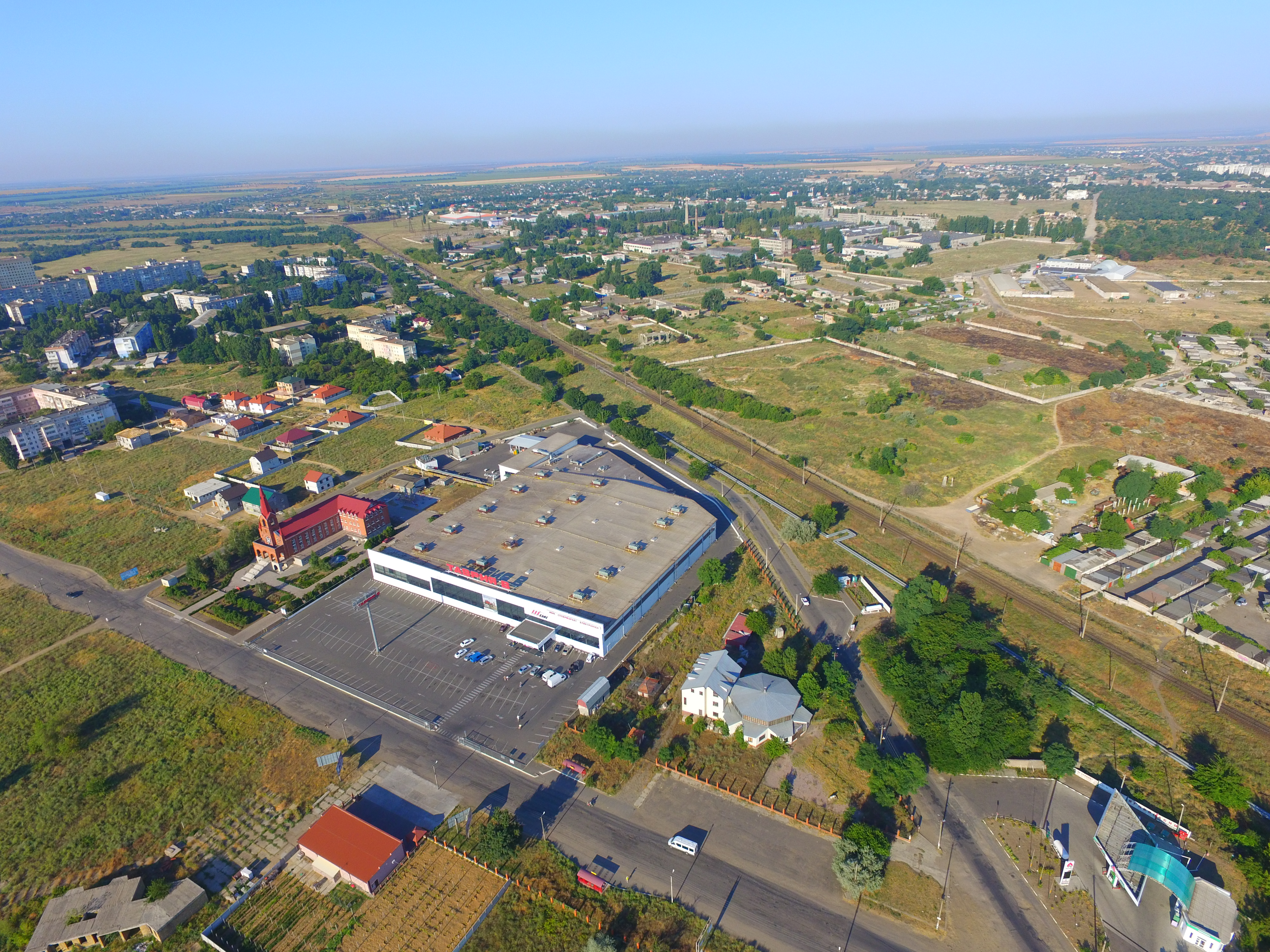
Church of Salvation and a shopping center

== See also ==
- Bilhorod-Dnistrovskyi Border Detachment
- Bilhorod-Dnistrovskyi fortress
- Bilhorod-Dnistrovskyi Seaport
- Svitlana Bilyayeva—archaeologist who has worked extensively on the fortress

== Sources ==
- Yakovenko, Natalia (2006). An Outline History of Medieval and Early Modern Ukraine. Krytyka. ISBN 9667679829.
