= Nicolas Astrinidis =

Romanian-born Greek composer, pianist, conductor, and educator

Nicolas Astrinidis (Greek: Νίκος Αστρινίδης; 6 May 1921, in Cetatea Albă– 10 December 2010, in Thessaloniki) was a Romanian-born Greek composer, pianist, conductor, and educator.

After receiving diplomas in piano performance and composition from the Schola Cantorum de Paris, Astrinidis embarked on an international career as pianist (soloist or accompanist). During the 1950s and the early 1960s, he toured East Asia and the Americas, performing in cities, such as Evanston and Hong Kong. He collaborated with renowned performers of the period, such as violinists Jacques Thibaud, Henryk Szeryng, Colette Frantz, and cellist Bernard Michelin. In 1949, Riccordi Americana published two of his piano works: Danse Grecque, and Deux Préludes.

In 1962 the life and martyrdom of Saint Demetrius became the subject of a 90-minute oratorio by Astrinidis. Three parts of the work were premiered at the first Demetria Festival in Thessaloniki on 26 October 1962. The entire oratorio was premiered in 1966 and received subsequent performances in 1985 (Thessaloniki) and in 1993 (Bucharest). All performances have been recorded.

His other symphonic music includes the oratorios The Youth of Alexander the Great, Cyril and Methodius (1966), the choral Symphony "1821" (1971), the Cypriot Rhapsody, three concertos: Variations Concertantes for piano and orchestra (1952–55), Concerto-Rhapsody for violin and orchestra (1979), and Concerto pour Guitare et Orchestre (2007).

A tribute to Astrinidis, with the composer talking about and performing his music, was held in New York City in 2004. In 2006, excerpts from his Symphony 1821 were performed in New Brunswick. In December 2020, pianist Stephanos Katsaros launched a 12-part mini-documentaries with live performances of Astrinidis' piano and chamber music works.

== Bibliography ==
- Chrissochoidis, Ilias. "The compositional work of Nikos Astrinidis: a first approach." Aristotle University of Thessaloniki, 1992.
- Chrissochoidis, Ilias. “From the Garden of Diaspora to the Cell of Repatriation: Hellenism in the Life and Works of Nikos Astrinidis,” in [Aspects of Hellenism in Music], Athens Concert Hall, Athens, Greece, 5–7 May 2006.
- Chrissochoidis, Ilias. "To drama sto ergo tou Nikou Astrinidē: eisagōgeikes paratērēseis" [Drama in the work of Nikos Astrinidēs: introductory remarks], Twentieth-Century Greek Music Creation in Lyric Drama and other Representative Arts, ed. G. Vlastos. Athens, 2009, 252–6.
- Pappa, V. and N. Pappas. Nikos Astrinidēs – Anatolizontes Glykasmoi [Nikos Astrinidēs – orientalizing jouissances]. Thessaloniki, 2010.
- Chrissochoidis, Ilias. Nicolas Astrinidis: Life – Works Catalog. Stanford, 2012.
- Karafillidis, Vangelis. "Nicolas Astrinidis (1921–2010): Compositional Languages in his ‘DEUX PIÈCES EN STYLE GREC’ for violin and piano." Studia Universitatis Babeş-Bolyai 57 (2012), 117–21.
- "An Astrinidīs resource," bibliolore: The RILM blog, 13 March 2013, [online https://bibliolore.org/2013/03/13/an-astrinidis-resource/].
- Sakallieros, Giorgos. "Astrinidēs [Astrinidis], Nikolaos [Nikos, Nicolaos]." Oxford Music Online (Grove Music Online), 3 September 2014. https://doi.org/10.1093/gmo/9781561592630.article.2270634
- Chrissochoidis, Ilias (editor). Nicolas Astrinidis (1921–2010): Symphony "1821." Stanford, 2018.
- Chrissochoidis, Ilias (editor). Nicolas Astrinidis, "Thourios by Rigas." Stanford, 2021.
- Chrissochoidis, Ilias (editor). Nicolas Astrinidis (arranger), "National Anthem of Greece." Stanford, 2021.
- Chrissochoidis, Ilias (editor). Nicolas Astrinidis (arranger), "Apolytikion of the Resurrection" (Vocal Score), Stanford, 2021.
- Chrissochoidis, Ilias (editor). Nicolas Astrinidis (arranger), "Famed Macedonia" (Vocal Score), Stanford, 2021.
- Chrissochoidis, Ilias (editor), Nicolas Astrinidis (arranger), "Apolytikion of Saint Demetrios" (Vocal Score), Stanford, 2021.
- Chrissochoidis, Ilias, "Astrinidis's 'Ithaka': Settling in Thessaloniki," 49-56, in 6th International Conference of Hellenic Symphonic Bands: “Wind ensembles: historical retrospect, journey, and transition in times of pandemic,” Thessaloniki, June 25-27 2021 Conference Proceedings, ed. by Kostis Hassiotis, Evangelia Kikou, and Christos Pouris (Thessaloniki: University of Macedonia, 2022).
- Hassiotis, Kostis, "A Fresh Look in to Nikos Astrinides's (1921-2010) Compositions for Wind Ensembles," International Journal of Music and Performing Arts, vol. 10, no. 1 (June 2023), 1-22.
- Chrissochoidis, Ilias. “Papadiamantis and the symphonic idiom: Sto Hristo sto Kastro (1991) by Nicolas Astrinidis”, H διαχρονία του Παπαδιαμάντη: Πρακτικά Δ' Διεθνούς Συνεδρίου (Εταιρεία Παπαδιαμαντικών Σπουδών, 2024), 645–658.
- Chrissochoidis, Ilias. "Defending Cyprus through art: Cypriot Rhapsody (1944) by Nicolas Astrinidis", American Journal of Contemporary Hellenic Issues 15 (Winter 2024–2025).
- Chrissochoidis, Ilias. "Nicolas Astrinidis' Symphony 1821: Casting the rise of modern Greece in sound," Musicology and Music Librarianship in Cultural Context in Honour of Stephanie Merakos, The Friends of Music Society at Megaron – The Athens Concert Hall, 20–21 February 2025.
- Chrissochoidis, Ilias. "'Symphony 1821' – A Neglected Masterpiece of Greek Music", The National Herald, March 22, 2025.
