= Osip Yermansky =

Osip Arkadyevich Yermansky (Russian: О́сип Арка́дьевич Ерма́нский; 28 July 1867 – 1941), born Yosif Arkadyevich Kogan (Russian: Иосиф Аркадьевич Коган), and known by the pseudonyms M. Borisov, A. O. Gushka, Meerovich, and P. R., was a Russian Social Democratic political figure, economic theorist, pamphleteer, and memoirist. He was one of the originators of the Soviet school of management, in particular, its psychophysiological tendency. He regarded scientific management as a syncretic, interdisciplinary system, drawing material from other scientific disciplines, such as technology, economics, psychology, and physiology.

== Early life ==
Yermansky was born in Akkerman, a town on the Dniester estuary, into a family of artisans. After receiving a traditional Jewish education, he studied jurisprudence at Odessa University. In 1888, as a consequence of his involvement in the students' movement, he was expelled and sent to the Caucasus. In 1891 he went to Switzerland, where he became acquainted with Pavel Axelrod, Vera Zasulich, Georgi Plekhanov, and Rosa Luxemburg. In 1892, he joined the Social Democratic movement while a student in Zurich, and in 1895 returned to Russia.

He became one of the leaders of the Social Democratic Party in southern Russia and editor of the newspaper Southern Worker («Южный рабочий»). After the 2nd Congress of the Russian Social Democratic Labour Party, he became a Menshevik. He was a delegate to the 4th Congress. In 1907 he turned his focus to literary activity and became the editor of several newspapers. During the First World War, as one of the leaders of the St. Petersburg "Initiative-taking group" (which espoused an internationalist anti-war position), Yermansky authored anti-war leaflets and contributed to the Menshevik press.

== After 1917 ==
After the February Revolution of 1917, he was from March to May the editor in chief of the Working Gazette («Рабочая газета»), the official paper of the Menshevik organization. In June he was a delegate to the first Congress of Soviets, and to the first All-Russian Central Executive Committee. From September to December he was the editor of Iskra.

After the October Revolution of 1917, he spoke in favor of the creation of uniform socialist government. At the Extraordinary 7th Congress of the RCP(b), he was elected to the presidium of congress. In contrast to Julius Martov, he proposed that the Mensheviks enter the All-Russian Central Executive Committee in order to provide a counterweight to the Bolsheviks.

In the spring of 1918, he moved to Moscow, where he edited the Menshevik journal Working International. In 1919 he became a full member of the Socialist Academy, and in 1920 he was elected to the Mossovet. He was arrested on August 23, 1920, and released in September. In April 1921 he left the RSDLP and joined the faculty of Moscow State University, where he concentrated exclusively on management and the scientific organization of labor. He was once more arrested on July 30, 1921, and again in 1931. From 1933 to 1936 he managed the department of economics and management at Bauman Moscow State Technical University. He was arrested in 1937 and again, for the last time, in 1940. He died in a Gulag in 1941.

== Works ==
- The Taylor System: Its Significance to the Working Class and to All of Humanity. «Система Тейлора. Что несет она рабочему классу и всему человечеству.» (Petersburg-Moscow, 1918)
- Index of Books and Articles on the Scientific Organization of Labor and Production. «Указатель книг и статей по научной организации труда и производства.» (Moscow, 1921)
- The Scientific Organization of Labor and Production in Taylor's System. «Научная организация труда и производства в системе Тейлора.» (Moscow, 1925, fourth edition)
- The Tragedy of Overproduction. «Трагедия расточительства в производстве» (Moscow-Leningrad, 1929)
- The Theory and Practice of Rationalization. «Теория и практика рационализации» (Moscow-Leningrad, 1928, fifth edition in 1933)
- The Stakhanovite movement and Stakhanovite Methods. «Стахановское движение и стахановские методы» (Moscow, Goskomizdat, 1940)
- From Experience (1877-1921) «Из пережитого (1877-1921)» (Moscow, Goskomizdat), Yermansky's memoirs, containing extensive material on the history of the Social Democratic movement in Russia.
