= Sansone =

People with the surname Sansone:

- Susanna-Assunta Sansone - Professor of Data Readiness at the University of Oxford
- Gilda Sansone - Italian fashion model
- Greg Sansone - Canadian sports anchor
- Gianluca Sansone (born 1987) Italian footballer
- Giovanni Sansone - Italian mathematician
- Kathryn Sansone - American homemaker
- Johnny Sansone (born 1957), is an American electric blues musician
- Lorenzo Sansone - horn player, music editor, educator, and horn manufacturer.
- Maggie Sansone - American recording artist
- Maria Sansone - American TV host
- Matteo Sansone (musicologist) - Italian musicologist (opera)
- Matteo Sansone (archaeologist) - (1916-1992), Italian pharmacist and archaeologist
- Nicola Sansone - Italian footballer
- Pat Sansone - American multi-instrumentalist
- Raffaele Sansone - (1910-1994), Italo-Uruguayan football player and coach
