= Tyras =

Ancient Greek city-state in Ukraine

- Τύρας (Ancient Greek)
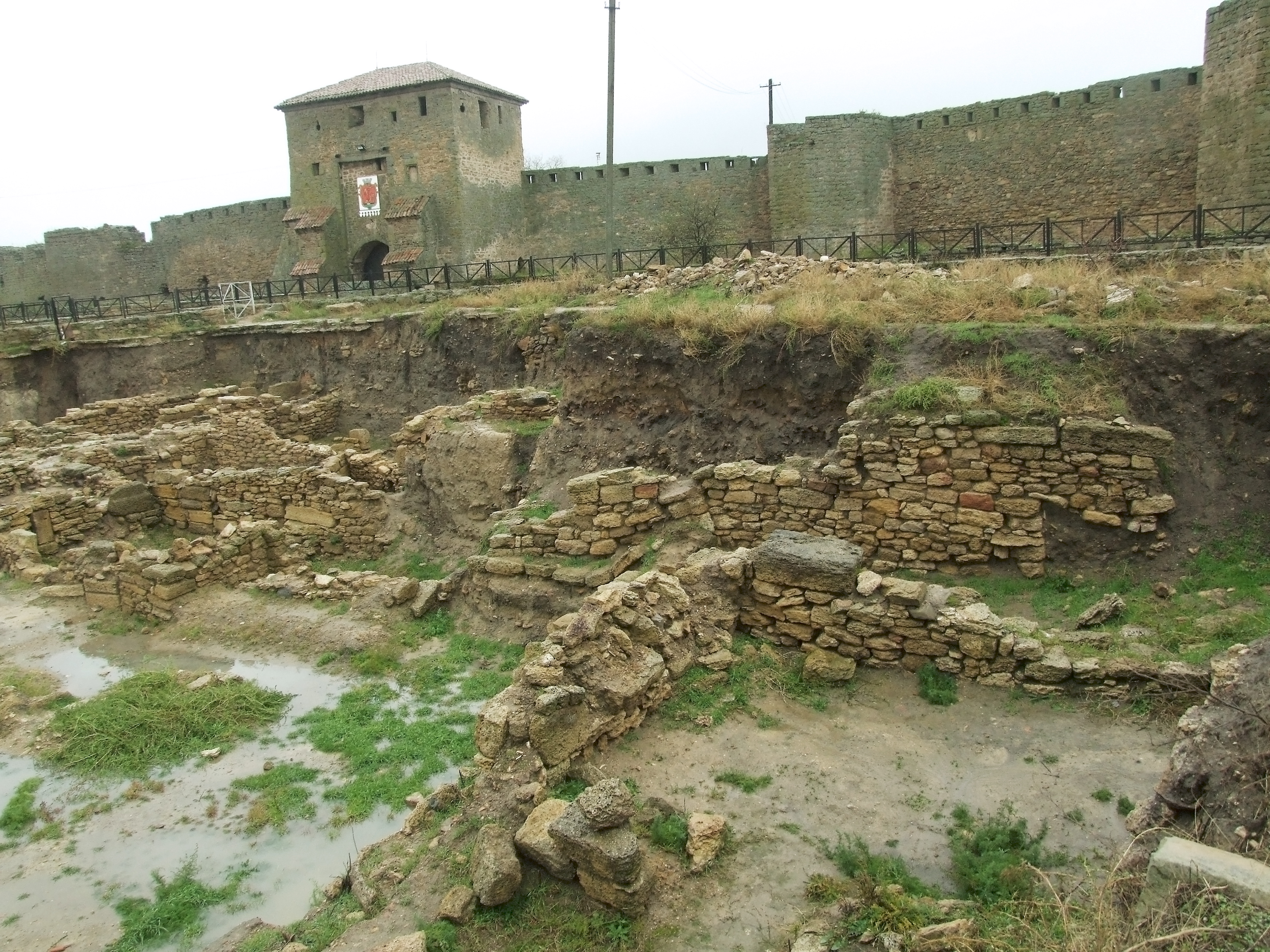
- Remains of Tyras, near the medieval walls of the Bilhorod-Dnistrovskyi fortress.

- Location within Ukraine Location within Odesa Oblast
- 46°12′3″N 30°21′6″E
- Type: Settlement
- Periods: Archaic Greek to Roman Imperial
- Cultures: Greek, Roman
- Location: Bilhorod-Dnistrovskyi, Odesa Oblast, Ukraine

History
- Built: Approximately 600 BC
- Built by: Settlers from Miletus
- Abandoned: Late 4th century AD

Site notes
- Condition: Ruined
- Owner: Public
- Public access: Yes

Immovable Monument of National Significance of Ukraine
- Official name: Городище "Тіра-Білгород" (Tyras-Bilhorod settlement)
- Type: Archaeology
- Reference no.: 150007-Н

Tyras (Ancient Greek: Τύρας) was an ancient Greek city on the northern coast of the Black Sea, also called Tyran (Τύραν). Stephanus of Byzantium reports that it was formerly called Ophiussa (Ὀφιοῦσσα). It was founded by colonists from Miletus, probably about 600 BC. The city was situated some 10 km from the mouth of the Tyras River, which is now called the Dniester. The surrounding native tribe was called the Tyragetae. The ruins of Tyras are now located in the modern city of Bilhorod-Dnistrovskyi in the Odesa Oblast of Ukraine.

== History ==
Of great importance in early times, in the 2nd century BC Tyras fell under the dominion of native kings whose names appear on its coins, and it was destroyed by the Getae about 50 BC.

In 56 AD, it seems to have been restored by the Romans under Nero and, henceforth, formed part of the province of Lower Moesia. There exists a series of its coins with heads of emperors from Domitian to Alexander Severus.

Indeed, the autonomous minting of coins in the city lasted from the time of the emperor Domitian (81 AD) up to the end of the reign of the emperor Alexander Severus (235 AD) with few breaks. The coins of Tyras of this period were of copper with the portraits of the members of the Imperial house for the province of the Roman Empire.

In Tyras was stationed a small unit of the Roman fleet, Classis Flavia Moesica.

In 201 CE, Septimius Severus and Caracalla granted the inhabitants of the city the right to engage in duty-free trade.

Soon after the time of Alexander Severus, it was partially destroyed by the Goths, but archaeological findings show that Romans remained there until the end of the 4th century under Theodosius I. Later, the Byzantines renamed the city, destroyed by barbarian invasions, with the new name Maurokastron, "black fort".

Its government was in the hands of five archons, a senate, a popular assembly and a registrar. The images on its coins suggest a trade in wheat, wine and fish. The few inscriptions are also mostly concerned with trade.

Remains of the city are scant, as its site has been covered by the great medieval fortress called by the Genoese Maurocastro (and later Akkerman/Cetatea Albă).

Tyras and the other Greek colonies along the north coast of the Black Sea, 8th to 3rd century BC

== See also ==
- List of Ancient Greek cities
