= Bilhorod-Dnistrovskyi fortress =

Fort in Odesa Oblast, Ukraine

Bilhorod-Dnistrovskyi fortress Akkerman fortress
- Bilhorod-Dnistrovskyi, Odesa Oblast
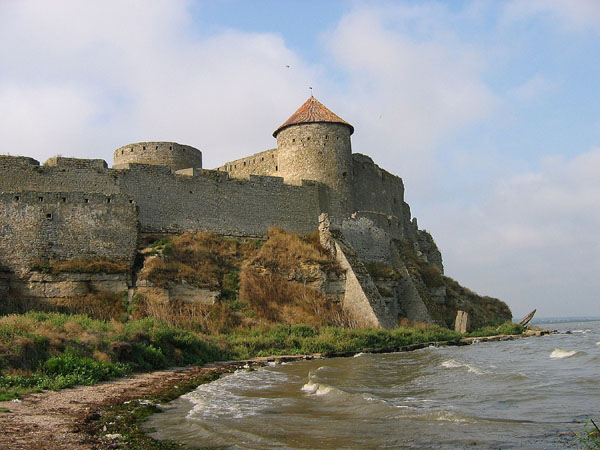

Location
- Location within Ukraine
- Coordinates: 46°12′3.96″N 30°21′2.16″E

The Bilhorod-Dnistrovskyi fortress or Akkerman fortress (Білгород-Дністровська фортеця, or Акерманська фортеця; Romanian: Cetatea-Albă; also known as Kokot) is a historical and architectural monument of the 13th–14th centuries. It is located in Bilhorod-Dnistrovskyi in the Odesa Oblast of southwestern Ukraine, in the Budjak, the historical region of Bessarabia.

== History ==
=== Start of construction ===
The fortress was built on the remains of Tyras, an ancient Greek city on the northern coast of the Black Sea which existed until the 4th century. Frequent attacks by invaders (Goths and Huns) destroyed the city. Antes, Slavs, and Bulgarians lived on the site of Tyras after the Greeks. In the 10th century, Bilhorod was part of Kievan Rus'. Later it was owned by the Kingdom of Hungary, then the Principality of Galicia–Volhynia, where it stayed until the invasion of the Mongols.

It is not known when construction began on the fortress. Most historians today believe that it was a trading exclave of the Republic of Genoa on the Black Sea, first established in the 13th century. The territory was surrendered to the Golden Horde, but the Genoese managed to ally with the Mongols.

Bilhorod was officially a Tatar city, but ruled by the Genoese; the fortress controlled the estuary of the Dniester.

In the second half of the 14th century, the Genoese lost their influence in the Black Sea region and secure passage across the Aegean Sea, because of increasing military pressure from the Ottomans. According to most historians, Lithuania came to replace Genoa. In the 14th century, the Principality of Moldavia gained control over the Lithuanians.

=== Moldavian period ===
After the territory came under the control of the Principality of Moldova, the Moldavians called it Cetatea Albă (literally White Citadel). In the 15th century the city was a metropolis with about 20,000 inhabitants - Moldavians, Greeks, Genoese, Armenians, Jews, Tatars. It was the start of the greatest development period in the city's history. The city was based on a fortress, which had already grown significantly. Its main elements had been constructed by 1440. The fortress had 34 towers, some as much as 20 meters tall. Outside, the fortress was surrounded by a deep moat. The fortress was built of white limestone, for which a mortar made of eggs, crushed marble, carbon, and silicon was used.

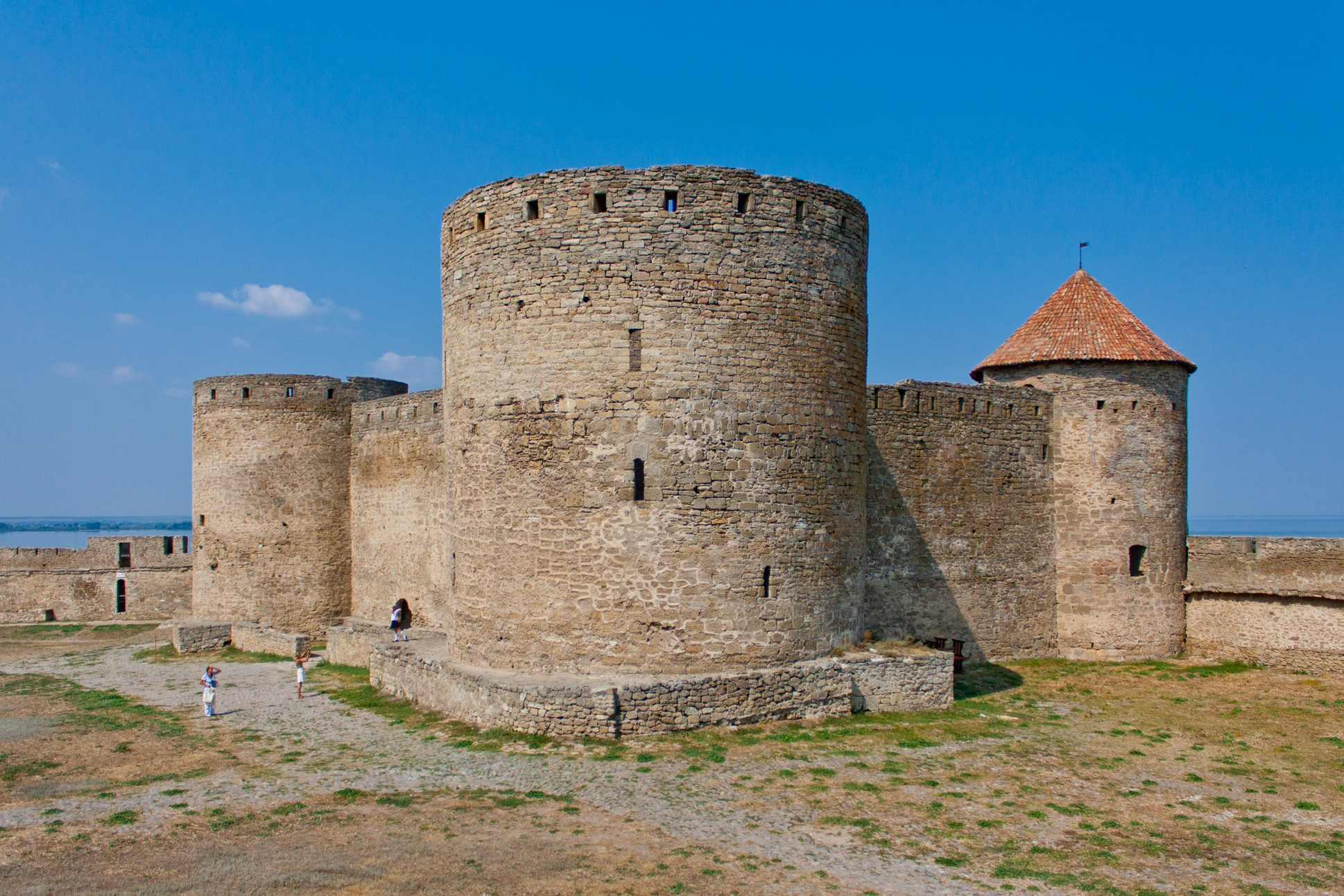
Citadel

In 1440 one portion which was neither a wall nor a castle tower was completed. This segment is located outside the castle walls very close to the estuary and has remains preserved today. Inside the wall, 10 stone cores were inlaid in the wall as a kind of talisman.

This part of the wall had no practical defensive value. For a long time historians and architects could not identify the purpose of it.

The cores inside the wall were shaped like a tetractys: a figure with ten points that form nine equilateral triangles. Some historians have speculated about its potential symbolic meaning, but the precise purpose remains unclear.

When in one of the towers, a plate was found, inscribed with: "Master Fedorko finished construction in 1440", some jumped to such a conclusion based solely on the grounds of the usage of the word "master".

Another explanation of Bilhorod's tetractys is much more pragmatic: some claim it is just a variant of a sundial calendar.

In the second half of the 15th century, the Moldavian principality was marred by a civil war between different factions, and king Bogdan II was murdered in an ambush by his brother Peter III Aaron in 1451. In 1457, the throne of Moldavia was captured by Stephen III of Moldavia (son of Bogdan II) with the help of his cousin Vlad the Impaler, prince of Wallachia. Since Cetatea Albă was the main defensive center in the southeast of the state, located right on the trade route between Europe and Asia, it was given renewed attention under a new ruler.

The fortress was constructed and reinforced with new stronger walls and a large gate, which then served as the main entrance to the fortress. In order to guard it, a permanent garrison was placed.

=== Ottoman period ===
In the 15th century, The Ottoman Empire repeatedly tried to capture the city. The hardest siege was in August 1484, when a 300,000-man army of Ottoman sultan Bayezid II and 50,000 troops of the Crimean Khan Meñli I Giray, supported by over 100 large ships, besieged the castle from the coast and estuary. After a nine-day siege, the fortress was taken. In 1485, Stephen the Great tried to recapture Bilhorod, but failed. Turks would rule there for 328 years.The Ottoman Empire made Bilhorod one of its strongholds in the north. The city suffered from endless attacks by the Zaporozhian Cossacks. Cossack chieftains repeatedly tried to sack the city, among them Hryhoriy Loboda, Severyn Nalivaiko, Ivan Sulima, Ivan Sirko, and Semen Paliy.

Moldavians and Poles did not leave the city in peace either. However, Bilhorod remained an impregnable stronghold. Much attention to the fortress was also paid by the vassals of Turkey: Crimean Tatars. Bilhorod was often a place of refuge during the campaigns, and the Crimean Khan İslâm II Giray even died in the fortress and was buried in the mosque, of which only one minaret now remains.

During the long Turkish domination, the Bilhorod fortress was repeatedly rebuilt and renovated with new fortifications. In 1657 Melek Ahmed Pasha significantly strengthened the fortress. In 1707, the Turks invited French military engineers, who constructed a new bastion line. After 1756, consolidation and repairs were made to the fortress almost every year.

In 1789, the town was captured without a fight by a large detachment of Don Cossacks and a Jäger (infantry) hunter corps headed by Mikhail Kutuzov. The following year, Kutuzov became commander of the fortress, but had to leave this position soon after. According to the agreement between Russia and the Ottoman Empire, the river Dniester was their border. The Ottoman period of Bilhorod ended in 1812, following the Russo-Turkish war of 1806-1812, when Russia took the eastern part of the Principality of Moldavia, between the Prut and Dniester rivers. The Treaty of Bucharest (1812) put Bessarabia (including Budjak) and Bilhorod under the control of the Russian Empire. The Akkerman Convention was signed in 1826 between the Russian and the Ottoman empires. This treaty expanded Russian influence in the Danube region and established a framework for the eventual independence of Western Moldavia and Wallachia.

== 20th century ==
The city and the surrounding district became part of the Moldovan Democratic Republic after it proclaimed its independence following the Russian Revolution. The Romanian Army, entered the city on 9 March 1918, fighting with local troops led by the Bolsheviks. Formal integration followed later that month, when the 'Sfatul Țării' of the Moldovan Democratic Republic proclaimed the whole of Bessarabia united with Romania. During the interwar period, the Romanian administration transformed Cetatea-Albă into an important administrative and cultural center of Greater Romania. The Fortress was restored and maintained, becoming an important symbolic Romanian medieval monument.

Romania ceded the city to the Soviet Union on 28 June 1940 following the 1940 Soviet occupation of Bessarabia. That year, the name was officially changed from Cetatea-Albă to Belgorod-Dniestrovski. The pieces with the heraldic symbols of Moldova and the Moldavian Principality were removed by Soviet authorities. Romania regained the city on 28 July 1941 during the invasion of the USSR in the course of the Second World War and held it until 22 August 1944, when the Red Army reoccupied the city. After the Soviets partitioned Bessarabia, creating the Moldavian Soviet Socialist Republic, the city and fortress became part of the Ukrainian SSR, and after 1991, Ukraine.

== Preservation ==
Bilhorod-Dnistrovskyi fortress video

Time has left its mark on the appearance of the fortress: only 26 of the exterior towers have survived, the interior rooms of the citadel and the cylindrical tower in the north-west corner of the fort have collapsed, and the buildings with civilian purposes have disappeared."

In 2009, the Bilhorod-Dnistrovskyi fortress was added to the State Register of Immovable Monuments of Ukraine. In 2019, together with the remains of the city of Tyras, the fortress was listed on the Tentative List of World Heritage Sites in Ukraine.
