= Reguzzoni =

Reguzzoni is an Italian surname. Notable people with the surname include:

- Carlo Reguzzoni (1908–1996), Italian footballer
- Marco Reguzzoni (born 1971), Italian politician and entrepreneur
- Mario Reguzzoni is the editor-in-chief of Aggiornamenti sociali, a magazine published by Centro Studi Sociali in Milan.

== See also ==
- Regazzoni
