= Lorenzo Sansone =

American musician

Lorenzo Sansone (1881–1975) was a horn player, a member of major North American symphony orchestras, an editor of horn music, an author of instructional methods, an educator, and a horn manufacturer.
