= Protected areas of Ukraine =

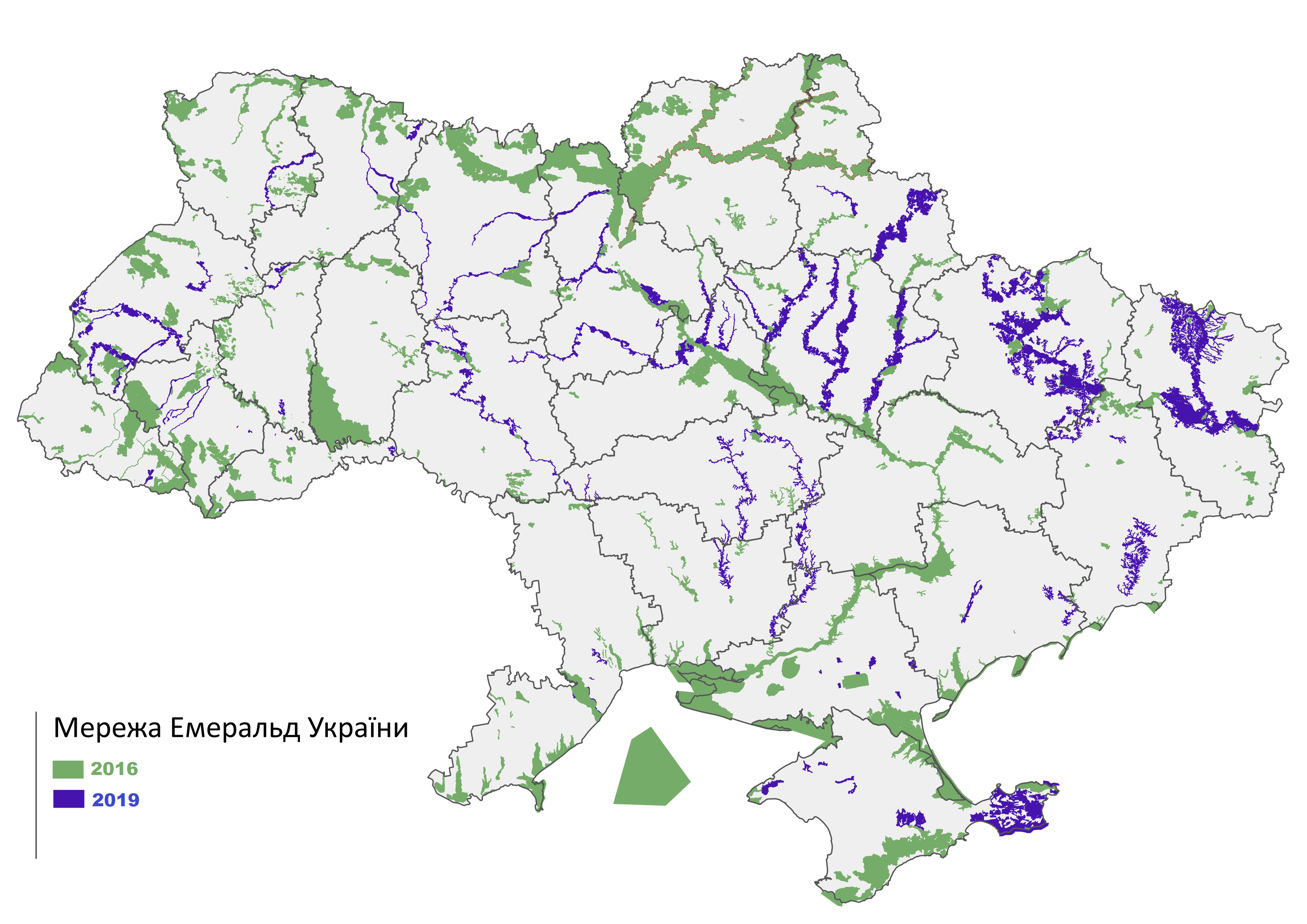
Emerald Network of Ukraine in 2019, the Ukrainian equivalent of Natura 2000, both part of the Emerald network of the Berne Convention on the Conservation of European Wildlife and Natural Habitats.

Protected areas of Ukraine (Ukrainian: охоронні території) are special areas of Ukraine established with the goal of protecting the natural and cultural heritage of the country from excessive changes as a result of human activity. The protection of the areas is the responsibility of the government of Ukraine, specifically the Cabinet of Ministers of Ukraine.

Ukraine has several categories of protected areas of Ukraine and the protected areas include:

- National Parks in Ukraine
- Biosphere reserves of Ukraine
- National Nature Parks of Ukraine
- Nature Preserves of Ukraine
- Ramsar sites in Ukraine
- Regional landscape parks of Ukraine
- Seven Natural Wonders of Ukraine
- Nature monuments of Ukraine
- Protected tracts of Ukraine
- Habitat / Species Managed Areas of Ukraine

== Designation and administration ==
There are two separate ministries that, together with the Cabinet of Ministers, administer the preservation of protected areas on the national scale. Local preservation is conducted through the regional State Administrations. The areas or landmarks that are designated as protected may carry either cultural or environmental value. Environmentally protected areas and objects in Ukraine are designed in the Nature Preservation Fund (PZF, "Природно-заповідний фонд України") which includes national parks, (nature preserves), natural landmarks, biosphere preserves, and other areas. Areas and objects from the cultural heritage, including museums, are also protected. The preservation of these areas and objects is supervised by different government ministries, which designate special agencies for the task of preservation. All objects from the cultural heritage are recorded in the State Registry for Fixed Landmarks of Ukraine (sometimes - simply as the Registry).

Since 2010, the governing body responsible for the organization, protection, and use of the Nature Preservation Fund has been the Ministry of Ecology and Natural Resources of Ukraine, which designated the State Service for Nature Preservation as a specialized department. The governing body responsible for the organization, protection, and use of all recorded nature preserves, museums, and other objects in the cultural heritage is the Ministry of Culture of Ukraine), which designated Derzhkultspadshchyna (abbreviated for the State Cultural Heritage) as a specialized department for this preservation.

=== Museums ===
Cultural preservation in Ukraine is conducted by the Ministry of Culture, as well as by individual museums, which may or not be state-owned. Museums are generally regulated by a special law on museums, which differs from the statutes of the government agency Derzhkultspadshchyna; however, museums that are part of a cultural preserve fall under the jurisdiction of the government and are supervised by Derzhkultspadshchyna. Individual museum objects or collections that are constantly kept on the territory of Ukraine, regardless of their origin and ownership, as well as museum objects or collections that are located outside of Ukraine and are property of Ukraine or subject to return there, according to international laws, are part of the Museum Fund of Ukraine. The Museum Fund of Ukraine may or not be part of state program for the preservation of the cultural heritage.

=== Chernobyl Exclusion Zone ===
The preservation of the cultural heritage and natural environment in the Chernobyl Exclusion Zone is exclusively conducted by the administration of that zone, which is under the jurisdiction of the Ministry of Emergencies.

== Nature preservation ==
=== History ===
The Main Directory of National Nature Parks and Nature Preservation, which supervised the protected areas of Ukraine, was created in 1995. In 2001 the Directory was reorganized into the State Service for Nature Preservation. Of all the different kinds of protected natural areas, the most important are considered to be nature preserves (zapovedniks), national nature parks, and nature reserves (zakazniks). The total area of the protected areas of Ukraine consists of 3,268,000 ha (8,080,000 acres), or around 5.4% of the total area of the country. The largest categories of protected areas are regional nature reserves, which account for over a third of the Nature Preservation Fund, and national nature parks, which represent about a quarter. The smallest are botanic gardens and zoos. In 2010, the Ministry of Ecology and Natural Resources, through the Cabinet of Ministers of Ukraine, submitted a proposition for parliamentary review, which outlined a plan for the development of the national ecological program of nature preservation through the year 2020. This proposal would increase the protected natural areas of Ukraine twofold.

=== Categories of protected natural areas ===
The scope of protected natural areas in Ukraine encompasses land and water areas, nature complexes and objects that carry special nature-protecting, scientific, aesthetic, recreational and other value. Areas are designated protected in order to preserve the natural variety of landscapes and the gene pool of their fauna and flora; to support general ecological balance; and to provide background environmental monitoring. Under the laws of Ukraine, these areas are treated as a part of the national heritage, as well as an integral part of the global system of natural areas and objects that are under special protection.

Protected natural areas in Ukraine are divided into one of the following: natural areas and objects, which include nature preserves, biosphere preserves, national nature parks, regional landscape parks, nature reserves, natural monuments, and protected tracts; and artificially created objects, such as botanic gardens, arboreta, zoological parks, and park architecture monuments. Depending on their ecological, scientific, historical, or cultural value, nature reserves, natural monuments, botanic gardens, arboreta, zoological parks, and park architecture monuments may be of nationwide or local importance.

Nature reserves can have varying degrees of protection, according to their botanical, generally zoological, ornithological, entomological, ichthyological, hydrological, generally geological, paleontological, or karst-speleological features, or their landscape and forestry; natural monuments can be complex, botanical, zoological, hydrological, and geological.

=== Forms of property ===
The territories of nature preserves, biosphere preserves, and other natural resources given to the national nature parks are the property of the Ukrainian people. Regional landscape parks, certain zones of biosphere preserves (buffer, anthropogenic landscapes, regulated preservation regime), and other lands and natural resources of national nature parks, nature reserves, natural monuments, protected tracts, botanical gardens, arboreta, zoological parks, and park architecture monuments may be the property of the Ukrainian people as well as any other forms of property provided by the legislation of Ukraine. Botanical gardens, arboreta, and zoological parks created before June 16, 1992 are not subject to privatization.

In the event of changes to the form of property on land where nature reserves, natural monuments, protected tracts, and park architecture monuments are located, the landowners are required to ensure their continued protection and preservation.

=== Legal basis for protected designation ===
The objective, scientific profile, nature of operation, and protection regimen of protected natural areas are defined by laws set forth by the central body of executive power in the sphere of Environmental Protection. Nature preserves, biosphere preserves, national nature parks, botanic gardens, arboreta, zoological parks of statewide importance, as well as regional landscape parks are considered legal entities. Botanic gardens, arboreta, zoological parks of local importance and park architecture monuments may be recognized as legal entities in respect to the legislation of Ukraine.

== Culture preservation ==
=== Classification ===
There are three major classes for objects of cultural heritage.

- structures (creations) - individually standing compositions of architectural and engineering art, compositions of monumental sculpturing and monumental painting, archeological objects, caves with existing evidence of human activity (building or quarters in them that preserved an authentic evidence about prominent historical events, life and work of known individuals);
- complexes (ensembles) - unified or separate topographically defined set of objects of cultural heritage among each other;
- prominent sites (points of interest) - zones or landscapes, nature-anthropogenic creations that brought to our time a value from an archeological, aesthetic, ethnological, historical, architectural, creative, scientific, or artistic perspective. (See List of historic reserves in Ukraine)

There are following types of objects of cultural heritage:

- archeological
- historical
- of monumental art
- of architecture
- of urban development
- of park architecture
- landscape
- of science and technology

=== Forms of property ===
All monuments except monuments of archeology may be a property of state, community, or individual. All monuments of archeology including the ones that are underwater along with any movable objects related to them are a state property. Such movable objects are attributed to the state part of Museum Fund of Ukraine, and subject for registration and preservation in accordance with law.

Form of property on a treasury that is considered a monument (attraction) is defined by the Civil Codex of Ukraine. In a document that certifies the form of property on a monument are indicated category of the monument, date and the number of decision for its state registration.

Lands where located monuments of archeology are property of state or withdrawn (sold) to state in the established by law order, excluding the land plots with the monument of archeology as fields of ancient battles.

=== Organization of objects of cultural heritage ===
In order to protect the traditional nature of the environment of populated places they recorded in the List of historical populated sites of Ukraine which is approved by the Cabinet of Ministers of Ukraine. Any urban, architectural, and landscape transformations as well as building, meliorative, road construction, and any excavations without the permission of the respective authority for protection of cultural heritage is prohibited.

Complex (ensemble) of monuments with its entire collection of components that carry cultural, historic, and scientific value, specially, planned, and functionally allocated within the structure of a populated settlement or localized outside of it, maybe declared a historic-cultural preserve of state or local importance. Historic-cultural preserved territory is declared a historically formed territory, within which remained significant number of objects of cultural heritage.

== See also ==
- Categories of protected areas of Ukraine
- Emerald Network of Ukraine
- Seven Natural Wonders of Ukraine
- Protected area
- State Registry of Fixed Landmarks of Ukraine
- List of historic reserves in Ukraine
- UNESCO protected areas in Ukraine
