= National Arboretum =

National Arboretum may refer to

- National Arboretum Canberra in Australia
- National Memorial Arboretum at Alrewas, UK
- Westonbirt Arboretum, formal name "Westonbirt, The National Arboretum", near Tetbury, Gloucestershire, UK
- United States National Arboretum in Washington, D.C.
- Type of an environment protected area with a national status in Ukraine
