= Biosphere reserves of Ukraine =

Biosphere reserves of Ukraine (Ukrainian: Біосферні резервати України) are preservation territories of international importance that are part of the Nature-Preservation Fund of Ukraine.

== Overview ==
The Ukrainian legislation has its own regulations about biosphere reserves which differs slightly from international. Nonetheless, Ukraine recognizes the International designation for natural conservation as well. Thus in Ukraine exist two concepts: biosphere reserves and biosphere preserves (Ukrainian: біосферні заповідники, romanized: biosferni zapovidnyky).

Biosphere preserves existed in the Soviet Union before establishment of the UNESCO's Man and the Biosphere Programme in 1971. Particularly in Ukraine, Carpathian Biosphere Reserve was created in 1968, but was admitted to the MAB programme only after fall of the Soviet Union in 1992.

The Chernobyl Radiation and Ecological Biosphere Reserve, which was created by the President in 2016, is a biosphere preserve (zapovidnyk) but not a UNESCO biosphere reserve.

Since 2012 there are eight biosphere reserves in Ukraine from the original three that the country inherited from the Soviet Union (Ukrainian SSR).

== List ==
No.	Name	Est.	UNESCO	Area (ha)	Regions	Managing Authority	Notes
1	Askania-Nova	1983	1985	33,307	Kherson Oblast	National Academy of Agrarian Sciences	Seven Natural Wonders
2	Black Sea Biosphere Reserve	1983	1984	89,129	Kherson and Mykolaiv Oblasts	National Academy of Sciences of Ukraine	
3	Carpathian Biosphere Reserve	1968	1992	57,880	Zakarpattia Oblast	Ministry of Ecology of Ukraine	World Heritage Site
4	Danube Biosphere Reserve (Danube Delta Biosphere Reserve)	1998	1998	50,252	Odesa Oblast, Romania	National Academy of Sciences of Ukraine	transboundary
5	Uzh National Nature Park and San River Regional Landscape Park (East Carpathian Biosphere Reserve)	NNP	1998	58,587	Zakarpattia and Lviv Oblasts, Poland, Slovakia	International Cooperative Administration	World Heritage Site, transboundary
-	Shatsk Biosphere Reserve	NNP	2002	48,977	Volyn Oblast		became part of West Polesie in 2012
6	Desna Biosphere Reserve	NNP	2009	58,293	Chernihiv Oblast		
7	Roztochchia Biosphere Reserve	NP	2011		Lviv Oblast, Poland		
8	West Polesie	NNP	2012	75,075	Belarus, Poland, Ukraine		transboundary

== See also ==
- Man and the Biosphere Programme
- Primeval Beech Forests of Europe
- Categories of protected areas of Ukraine
