= Marble Cave =

Marble Cave can refer to:

- Marble Cave, Kosovo
- Marble Cave (Crimea)
- Marvel Cave (Missouri)
