= Seven Wonders of Ukraine =

Historical and cultural monuments

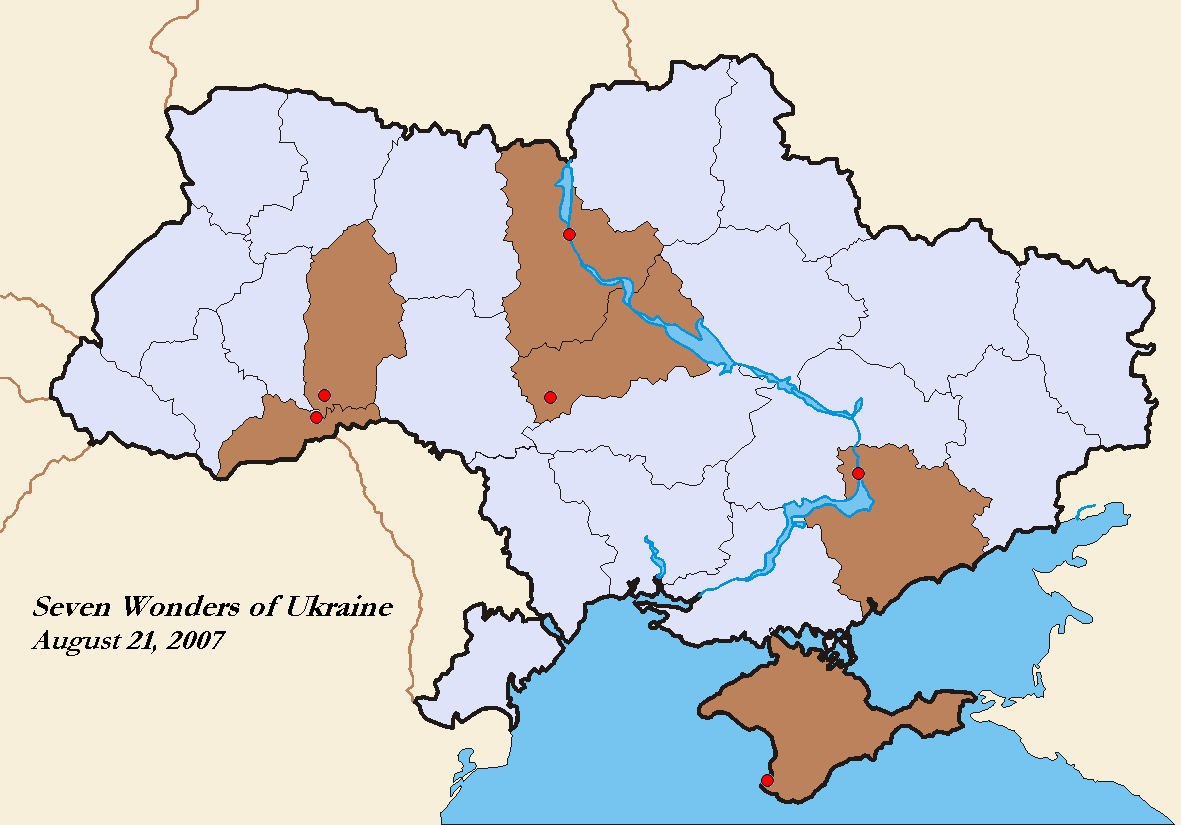
Locations of the Seven Wonders of Ukraine

The Seven Wonders of Ukraine (Ukrainian: Сім чудес України, romanized: Sim chudes Ukraïny [ˈsʲim tʃʊˈdɛs ʊkrɐˈjinɪ]) are seven historical and cultural monuments of Ukraine, which were chosen in the Seven Wonders of Ukraine contest held in July, 2007. This was the first public contest of that kind which was followed by the Seven Natural Wonders of Ukraine, the Seven Wonderful Routes of Ukraine, and the Seven Wonderful Castles of Ukraine. All nominated sites are publicly owned protected areas of at least regional level, available for tourism.

The voting for all contests consisted of two parts: experts in Ukraine voted for their seven best sites, and internet users voted for their seven favorite sites on the official website.

== History ==
The initiative was started by (one of the) deputy chairman of Verkhovna Rada Mykola Tomenko under the motto "Piznai Ukrainu!" (Discover Ukraine). The initiative was a continuation of numerous preceding public actions that took place in various regions of Ukraine such as "Kupala's games at the native land of Gogol" (Poltava Oblast), "Starry autumn in Kachanivka" (Chernihiv Oblast), "Let's discover Khortytsia Island" (Zaporizhzhia Oblast), "Masliana in Bukovina" (Chernivtsi Oblast), "Amber legends of Rivne Oblast", "Day of Europe at the native land of Lesya Ukrainka" (Volyn Oblast), and others.

The next stage of the initiative was the organization of the Seven Natural Wonders of Ukraine in 2008.

== Organization committee ==
The organization committee consisted of:

- Mykola Tomenko (parliamentarian of the 5th convocation of the Ukrainian parliament)
- Andriy Pakhlya (head of State Service of tourism and vacation resorts)
- Oleksandr Volkov (parliamentarian of the 5th convocation of the Ukrainian parliament)
- Oleksandr Bryhynets (Kyiv city politician)
- Yuri Artymenko (deputy head of parliamentary committee)
- Volodymyr Kurinny (head of Vekhovna Rada subcommittee)
- Volodymyr Ilchenko (chief-editor of "Mandry" magazine)
- Oleksandr Bohutsky (general director of Ukrainian TV-channel ICTV)
- Viktor Kolesnyk (dean of historic department of Kyiv University)
- Viktor Nabrusko (president of the National Radio company of Ukraine)
- Ihor Pasichnyk (rector of the National university Ostroh Academy)
- Nataliya Sumska (National actress of Ukraine)
- Anzhelika Rudnytska (Distinguished actress of Ukraine)
- Volodymyr Shevchenko (rector of Donetsk National University)
- Oleksandr Kharchenko (chief-editor of informational agency UNIAN)

=== Partners ===
- Tut i tam – site of the tourism gourmands
- For Kyiv – Internet-portal
- Mandry – magazine
- National Radio company of Ukraine
- UNIAN – information agency
- ICTV – television channel

== Selection ==
Local and provincial (oblast) authorities composed a list of 1,000 possible candidates. An expert council consisting of 100 people, including culturologists, historians, and tourist specialists, chose a list of 21 candidates from which people on the internet could vote.

Voting on the 21 possible candidates was opened on July 7, 2007. A total of around 77,000 internet users voted in the campaign. The voting was closed on August 21, 2007 and the results were officially announced on the same day. The campaign was initiated in May 2007 by Mykola Tomenko, a Ukrainian politician and the deputy of the Parliament of Ukraine of the fifth convocation.

Each manager of a winning nomination was awarded a statue of their candidate made out of green marble, matte steel, and gold-mirror acrylic paint.

== Results ==
Just before the next Independence Day of Ukraine, on 21 August 2007 were announced final results of the voting.

Voting results
Wonder	Internet		Experts		Total
Wonder	place	score	place	score	Total
Sofiyivka Park	2	20	3	19	39
Kyiv Pechersk Lavra	4	18	1	21	39
Kamianets-Podilskyi Castle	3	19	5	17	36
Khortytsia	1	21	7	15	36
Chersoneses	6	16	4	18	34
Saint Sophia Cathedral in Kyiv	9	13	2	20	33
Khotyn Fortress	5	17	12	10	27
special nominations
Livadia Palace	7	15	10	12	27
Ostroh Castle	10	12	13	9	21
Pysanka Museum	8	14	17	5	19
extended ranking
Stone Grave	12	10	9	13	23
Pochaiv Monastery	14	8	8	14	22
Odesa Opera	11	11	14	8	19
Holy Mountains Monastery	19	3	6	16	19
Saint Anthony's Caves	16	6	11	11	17
Palanok Castle	13	9	18	4	13
Olesko Castle	18	4	15	7	11
Lutsk Castle	15	7	20	2	9
Shevchenko Heritage Park	21	1	16	6	7
House of the State Industry	17	5	21	1	6
Pereiaslav	20	2	19	3	5

=== List ===
#	Name	Location	Image
1 / 2	Sofiyivka Park	Uman, Cherkasy Oblast	The landscape of the Sofiyivsky Park.
1 / 2	Kyiv Pechersk Lavra (Monastery of the Caves)	Kyiv	Kyiv Pechersk Lavra.
3 / 4	Kamianets National Historic-Architectural Reserve	Kamianets-Podilskyi, Khmelnytskyi Oblast	General view of the Kamianets-Podilskyi Castle.
3 / 4	Khortytsia	Zaporizhzhia, Zaporizhzhia Oblast	View Khortytsia and the nearby Dnieper Hydroelectric Station.
5	Chersonesos Taurica (Khersones Tavriiskyi)	Sevastopol	The remains of the city of Chersonesos.
6	Saint Sophia Cathedral	Kyiv	The Saint Sophia Cathedral.
7	Khotyn Fortress	Khotyn, Chernivtsi Oblast	Panoramic view of the Khotyn Fortress.

=== Special nominations ===
Three objects from the nomination list awarded a special recognition:

- the Livadia Palace, a monument of modern history, Livadiysky Palace-Museum, Monument of Architecture;
- the Ostroh Castle, a spiritual monument, part of the Ostroh Regional Museum;
- the Pysanka Museum in Kolomyia, a monument of modern Ukraine, part of National Museum of Hutsul-land and Pokuttia folk-art of Yosafat Kobrynsky.

=== Full ranking lists ===
- Ranking by votes of internet-users: 1) Khortytsia, 2) Sofiyivka Park, 3) Kamianets, 4) Kyiv Pechersk Lavra, 5) Khotyn Fortress, 6) Chersoneses Taurica, 7) Livadia Palace, 8) Pysanka Museum, 9) Sophia of Kyiv, 10) Ostroh Castle and the Academy, 11) Odesa Opera Theater, 12) Stone Grave, 13) Palanok Castle, 14) Pochaiv Monastery, 15) Lutsk Castle, 16) Saint Anthony's Caves, 17) House of the State Industry, 18) Olesko Castle, 19) Holy Mountains Monastery, 20) Pereiaslav, 21) Shevchenko Heritage Park
- Ranking by votes of experts: 1) Kyiv Pechersk Lavra, 2) Sophia of Kyiv, 3) Sofiyivka Park, 4) Chersoneses Taurica, 5) Kamianets, 6) Holy Mountains Monastery, 7) Khortytsia, 8) Pochaiv Monastery, 9) Stone Grave, 10) Livadia Palace, 11) Saint Anthony's Caves, 12) Khotyn Fortress, 13) Ostroh Castle and the Academy, 14) Odesa Opera Theater, 15) Olesko Castle, 16) Shevchenko Heritage Park, 17) Pysanka Museum, 18) Palanok Castle, 19) Pereiaslav, 20) Lutsk Castle, 21) House of the State Industry

== All contenders ==
- Kyiv: Kyiv Pechersk Lavra, Sophia of Kyiv, House with Chimaeras;
- Crimea: Livadia Palace, Mount Mithridat, Alupka Palace and Park Heritage Center, Swallow's Nest;
- Vinnytsia Oblast: Nikolay Pirogov Manor, Old Slavic Cave Temple with Busha Relief, Nemyriv Schythian oppidum;
- Volyn Oblast: Lubart's Castle, Volodymyr complex of historic and cultural landmarks, Lesya Ukrainka Museum in Kolodiazhne, Chelm Icon of Virgin Mary;
- Dnipropetrovsk Oblast: Stone Female Sculptures, Ivan Sirko Grave, Novomoskovsk Trinity Cathedral, Nativity of Mary Church, Ukrainian line;
- Donetsk Oblast: Historic and Architectural Reserve in Sviatohirsk;
- Zhytomyr Oblast: Saint Basil the Great Church, Stone Village, Korolyov Museum of Astronautics;
- Zakarpattia Oblast: Palanok Castle, Forest and rafting museum at Chorna River, Saint Michael Orthodox Church, Nevytske Castle;
- Zaporizhzhia Oblast: Historic and Archaeological Reserve "Stone Grave", Khortytsia, DnieperHES;
- Ivano-Frankivsk Oblast: Pysanka Museum, Dovbush Rocks, Holy Spirit Church;
- Kyiv Oblast: Pereiaslav Historic and Ethnographic Reserve, Liutizh Beachhead, Ivan Kozlovsky Manor, Arboretum Oleksandriya, Dobranychivka Archaeological Site, Holy Protection Church, Kateryna Bilokur Manor;
- Kirovohrad Oblast: Tobilevych Museum Heritage Park, Saint Elizabeth Fortress, Kirovohrad Oblast Art Museum;
- Luhansk Oblast: Vladimir Dal Literature Museum, Memorial "To the Fighters of the Revolution", Derkul Stud Farm complex;
- Lviv Oblast: Olesko Castle, Svirzh Castle, Pidhirtsi Castle, Krekhiv Monastery, Tustan Fortress;
- Mykolaiv Oblast: Historic and Archaeological Reserve Olbia, Dykyi Sad Archaeological Monument;
- Odesa Oblast: Odesa Theater of Opera and Ballet, Akkerman Fortress, Potemkin Stairs;
- Poltava Oblast: Gogol Museum Reserve, Kotlyarevsky Literature and Memorial Museum and Manor, Saint Nicholas Church, Poltava Regional Studies Museum, Poltava Exaltation of the Holy Cross Monastery;
- Rivne Oblast: Ostroh Castle and the Academy, Saint Trinity Monastery, Dubno Castle;
- Sumy Oblast: Monument to the Mammoth, Round Courtyard, Reverend Sophroni Monastery;
- Ternopil Oblast: Verteba Cave, Bohyt Mount, Buchach Townhall (Rathaus), Pochaiv Lavra, Zavarnytsia Spiritual Center, Vyshnivets Palace Complex, UPA Camp, Castles of the Ternopil Oblast Historic and Architectural Reserve;
- Kharkiv Oblast: House of the State Industry, Holy Intercession Monastery, Skovoroda Literary and Memorial Museum;
- Kherson Oblast: Askania-Nova Park, Legendary Armed Charabanc, Kozel Kurgan, Shovkunenko Art Museum in Kherson, Saint Catherine Cathedral;
- Khmelnytskyi Oblast: Kamianets Historic and Architectural Reserve, Medzhybizh Historic and Cultural Reserve, Samchyky Historic and Cultural Reserve;
- Cherkasy Oblast: Arboretum Sofiyivka, Taras Shevchenko Homeland Heritage Park, Trypillia Culture Historic and Cultural Reserve, Shevchenko Heritage Park;
- Chernivtsi Oblast: Khotyn Fortress Historic and Architectural Reserve, Bukovina Metropolitan Bishops Residence, Russian Old Believers Assumption Cathedral;
- Chernihiv Oblast: Saint Anthony's Caves, Saviour-Transfiguration Cathedral, Hustynia Monastery, Princely Gord of Novhorod-Siverskyi;
- Sevastopol: 1854–1855 Sevastopol Defense Panorama, Chersoneses Taurica.

== Seven Natural Wonders ==
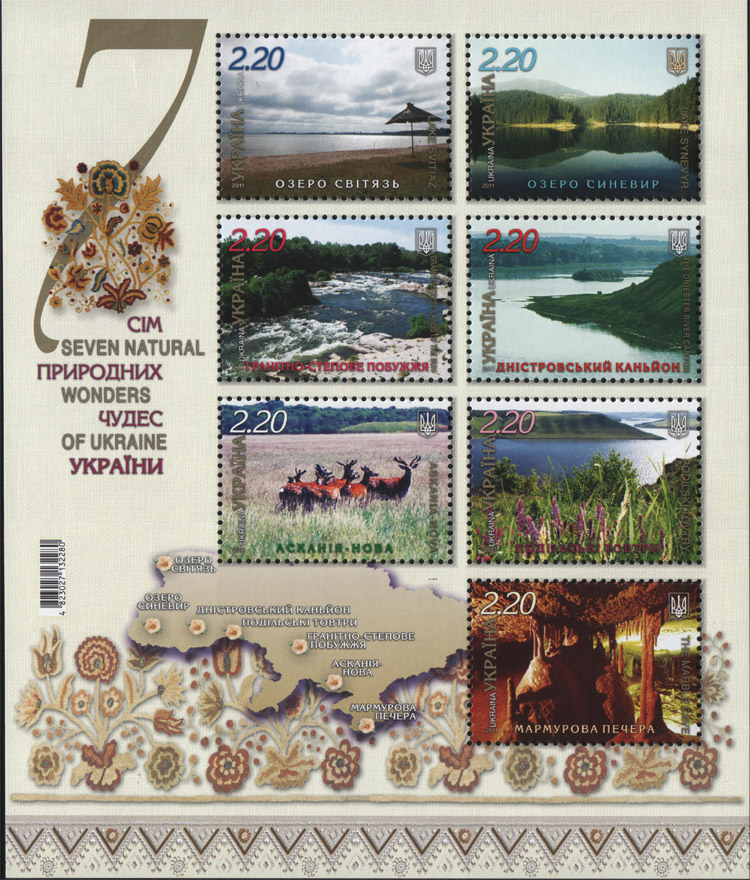
Ukraine postal stamp commemorating images of the "Seven natural wonders of Ukraine"

The Seven Natural Wonders of Ukraine (Ukrainian: Сім природніх чудес України, romanized: Sim pryrodnikh Tchudes Ukrainy) is the selection of the most popular and unique natural landmarks in Ukraine, as the second stage of the Seven Wonders of Ukraine national program. All seven sites are publicly owned protected areas of at least regional level, available for tourism.

#	Name	Location	Image
1	Falz-Fein Biosphere Preserve "Askania-Nova"	Askania-Nova, Kherson Oblast	
2	Landscape park "Granite-steppe lands of Buh"	Mykolaiv Oblast	Valley of Mertvovod.
3	Landscape park "Dnister Canyon"	Ternopil Oblast	Dniester Canyon between village Hubyn (Ternopil region) and town Chernelytsia (Ivano-Frankivsk region), western Ukraine.
4	Simferopol Speleology Museum (Marble Cave)	AR Crimea	
5	National Nature Park "Podilski Tovtry"	Khmelnytskyi Oblast	View of the entrance to the park, near the historic town of Bakota.
6	Shatsk National Nature Park	Volyn Oblast	Svitiaz.
7	National Nature Park "Synevyr"	Zakarpattia Oblast	Synevir.

=== Special Nominations ===
Three objects from the nomination list needed a special nomination:

- Balaklava Bay, Balaklava (Sevastopol)
- Oleshky Sands, the second-largest desert in Europe near Askania-Nova
- Optymistychna Cave, the biggest cave on the continent, near village of Korolivka, Ternopil Oblast

=== Other important nominees ===
- Basalt columns
- Bukovina waterfalls
- Hoverla
- Desna floodplains
- Danube Biosphere Preserve
- Stone Tombs
- Kaniv Mountains
- Karadag Nature Reserve
- Kochubei Oaks
- Tustan
- Apple Colony

=== Selection program ===
which were chosen in the Seven Natural Wonders of Ukraine on August 26, 2008. The voting consisted of two parts: experts in Ukraine voted for their seven best sites, and internet users voted for their seven favorite sites on the official website.

As for the original event of the Seven Wonders of Ukraine the local and provincial (oblast) authorities composed a list of 1,000 possible candidates. An expert council consisting of 100 people, including culturologists, historians, and tourist specialists, chose a list of 21 candidates from which people on the internet could vote.

The internet voting on the 21 possible candidates was opened on July 7, 2008, at the program's web-site. A total of around 77,000 internet users voted in the campaign. The voting was closed on August 26, 2008, and the results were officially announced on the same day. The whole campaign was initiated back in May 2007 by Mykola Tomenko a Ukrainian politician and the deputy of the Parliament of Ukraine of the fifth convocation.

Each manager of a winning nomination was awarded a statue of their candidate made out of green marble, matte steel, and gold-mirror acrylic paint.

== Castles and Palaces ==
The Seven Wondrous Castles and Palaces of Ukraine (Ukrainian: Сім чудесних замків та палаців України, romanized: Sim chudesnykh zamkiv ta palatsiv Ukrayiny) is the third stage of the Seven Wonders of Ukraine program that has resumed after a three-year break. They are another seven wondrous attractions of Ukraine, which were chosen in the Seven Wonders of Ukraine (castles, fortresses, palaces) on December 1, 2011. During the break there were intentions to conduct a competition for the Seven Wondrous Marchroutes of Ukraine, but that idea was scratched and was never realized. The voting for seven wondrous palaces and castles, as its preceding events, consisted of two parts: experts in Ukraine voted for their seven best sites, and internet users voted for their seven favorite sites on the official website.

As for the original event of the Seven Wonders of Ukraine, the local and provincial (oblast) authorities composed a list of 138 possible candidates. An expert council consisting of 100 people, including culturologists, historians, and tourist specialists, chose a list of 21 candidates (7 fortresses, 7 palaces, 7 castles) from which people on the internet could vote.

The internet voting on the 21 possible candidates was opened on August 22, 2011 at the program's web-site. A total of around 77,000 internet users voted in the campaign. The voting was closed on December 1, 2011, and the results were officially announced on the same day. The whole campaign was initiated back in May 2007 by Mykola Tomenko, a Ukrainian politician and the deputy of the Parliament of Ukraine of the fifth convocation.

Each manager of a winning nomination was awarded a statue of their candidate made out of green marble, matte steel, and gold-mirror acrylic paint.

#	Name	Location	Image
1	Lutsk Upper Castle	Lutsk, Volyn Oblast	
2	Kamianets-Podilskyi Castle	Kamianets-Podilskyi, Khmelnytskyi Oblast	
3	Akkerman Fortress	Bilhorod-Dnistrovskyi, Odesa Oblast	
4	Metropolitan Palace	Chernivtsi, Chernivtsi Oblast	
5	Khotyn Fortress	Khotyn, Chernivtsi Oblast	
6	Kachanivka Palace	Kachanivka, Chernihiv Oblast	
7	Vorontsov Palace	Alupka, AR Crimea	

=== Special Nominations ===
Three objects from the nomination list needed a special nomination:

- Olesko Castle, Olesko, Lviv Oblast
- Chyhyryn Fortress, Chyhyryn, Cherkasy Oblast
- Bakhchysarai Palace, Bakhchysarai, AR Crimea
- Kyrylo Rozumovsky Palace, Baturyn, Chernihiv Oblast

=== Other important nominees ===
- Dubno Castle
- Medzhybizh Fortress
- Genoese Fortress
- Palanok Castle
- Zolochiv Castle
- Uzhhorod Castle
- Mariinskyi Palace
- Kyiv Fortress
- Livadia Palace
- Zbarazh Castle

== See also ==
- Seven Wonders of the World
- List of UNESCO World Heritage Sites in Ukraine
- Wonders of the World
- Protected areas of Ukraine
- Marble Caves, Crimea
