= Categories of protected areas of Ukraine =

Categories of Natural Environment Protected Areas of Ukraine were reestablished (redefined) by the Verkhovna Rada (national parliament of Ukraine) after the fall of the Soviet Union. On 16 June 1992 the President of Ukraine Leonid Kravchuk signed the law on the Nature-Preservation Fund of Ukraine. The law redefined already the established system of environment protection management for Ukraine as a fully sovereign and independent country. National Parks in Ukraine and other protected areas of Ukraine include Ramsar sites in Ukraine, biosphere reserves of Ukraine, National Nature Parks of Ukraine, Nature Reserves of Ukraine, Regional landscape parks of Ukraine, Nature monuments of Ukraine, Protected tracts of Ukraine and Habitat/Species Managed Areas of Ukraine.

== Protected area systematization ==
The Law defines ten categories of protected areas. In general perspective the categories correspond to the internationally recognized IUCN protected area categories (see World Commission on Protected Areas).

The table below lists the protected area category, the management level and the proclaiming body. Note that categories are not necessarily hierarchal.

IUCN Class	Protection category	Intent	Form of property	Type of creation
I	BIOSPHERE RESERVE (Biosferny zapovidnyk)	Conservation of typical nature complexes, ecological monitoring, and education	international / non-private	natural
I	NATURE RESERVE (Pryrodny zapovidnyk)	Conservation of typical or unique nature complexes, education, scientific research for environment protection, ecological use and safety	national / non-private	natural
II	NATIONAL NATURE PARK (Natsionalny pryrodny park)	Conservation, restoration, and efficiency for historic-cultural, aesthetic, educational, and similar values	national / non-private	natural
V	REGIONAL LANDSCAPE PARK (Rehionalny landshaftny park)	Conservation of typical or unique nature complexes and implementation of organized recreation	regional / public	natural
VI / VII	NATURE RESERVE (Zakaznik)	Conservation and restoration of nature complexes or their separate components	regional / public	natural
III	LANDMARK OF NATURE (Pamiatka pryrody)	Conservation of naturally intact (as special environmental, scientific, aesthetic, educational, and cultural meaning)	regional / public	natural
III	PROTECTED TRACT (Zapovidne urochyshche)	Conservation of naturally intact (as important scientific, environmental, and aesthetic meaning)	regional / public	natural
IV	BOTANICAL GARDEN (Botanichny sad)	Conservation, botanic study, conducting scientific, instructional, and educational activities	regional / public*	artificial
IV	DENDROLOGY PARK (ARBORETUM) (Dendrolohichny park, dendropark)	Conservation, dendrology study	regional / public*	artificial
IV	ZOOLOGY PARK (Zoolohichny park, zoopark)	Education, exposition, conservation, fauna study	regional / public*	artificial
IV	LANDSCAPE ARCHITECTURE LANDMARK (Park-pamiatka sadovo-parkovoho mystetstva)	Preservation and use of the most prominent and valuable examples of landscape architecture for aesthetic, educational, scientific, environmental, and recreational purposes	regional / public	artificial

- Note: Botanical gardens, arboreta, and zoological parks created before 16 June 1992 are not subject to privatization.

== Detailed description ==
=== Biosphere Reserves ===
Biosphere Reserves (colloquially biosphere zapovidnyks) are environment-protected scientific-research institutions of international status that are created with the intent for conservation in a natural state the most typical natural complexes of biosphere, conducting background ecological monitoring, studying of the surrounding natural environment, its changes under the activity of anthropogenic factors.

Biosphere Reserves are created on the base of nature reserves, national nature parks including to their composition territories and objects of other categories of nature-preserving fund and other lands as well as including in the established order the World Network of Biosphere Reserves in the UNESCO framework "Man and the Biosphere Programme".

=== Nature Reserves (zapovidnyks) ===
Nature Reserves (colloquially nature zapovidnyks) are environment-protected, scientific-research institutions of statewide status that are created with the goal of conservation in natural state typical or unique for a given landscape zone nature complexes with the entire collection of their components, studying of natural processes and phenomena that occur in them, developing scientific foundation for protection of the surrounding natural environment, efficient use of natural resources as well as ecological safety.

Plots of land and water area with all the natural resources are completely withdrawn from commercial use and granted to preserves in order established by the Law of Ukraine.

The main objective of the nature preserves is conservation of nature complexes and objects on their territories, conducting scientific research and observations after the state of the surrounding natural environment, development on their basis environment protective recommendations, dissemination of environmental awareness, facilitation in preparation of scientific personnel and specialists in the field of protection of the surrounding natural environment and nature preservation.

The Nature Preserves are also responsible for coordination and carrying out scientific research on territories of nature reserves, nature monuments, protected tracts in a region.

=== National Nature Park ===
National Nature Parks are environment-protected, recreational, culture-educational, and scientific-researching institutions of a statewide status that are created with the goal of conservation, restoration, and effective use of natural complexes and objects that have special environment-protected, health-oriented, historic-cultural, educational, aesthetic value.

Plots of land and water area with all the natural resources and objects are withdrawn from commercial use and granted to the National Nature Parks in order established by the Law of Ukraine.

The composition of the territories of the National Nature Parks may include plots of land and water area of other landowners and land users.

The National Nature Parks are vested implementation of such fundamental tasks:

- conservation of valuable natural and historic-cultural complexes and objects;
- creating conditions for organized tourism, recreation, and other outdoor activities in natural conditions in compliance with the regime of protection of preserved natural complexes and objects;
- conducting scientific research of natural complexes and their changes under the conditions of recreational use, development scientific recommendations on the protection of the surrounding natural environment and effective use of natural resources;
- implementation of environmental education work.

All nature parks in Ukraine are national parks.

=== Regional landscape park ===
Regional landscape parks are environment-protected recreational institutions of local or regional status that are created with the goal of conservation in natural state typical or unique natural complexes and objects as well as providing the conditions for organized recreation for the population.

Regional landscape parks are organized with withdrawal or without withdrawal of land plots, water, and other natural objects from their owners or users.

=== Nature reserves (zakaznyks) ===
Nature reserves (colloquially zakaznyks) are declared natural territories (aquatic areas) with the goal of conservation and restoration of natural complexes or their separate components.

Declaration of reserves (zakaznyks) is conducted without withdrawal of land plots, water, and other natural objects from their owners or users.

Types: zoological, botanical, wooded, landscape, hydrological, ornithological, geological, ecological, entomological, karst-speleological, ichthyological.

=== Landmark of Nature ===
Prominent nature attractions are declared with the goal of conservation them in natural state. Their declaration is conducted without the withdrawal of land plots, water, and other natural objects from their owners or users. There various types of nature attractions recognized in Ukraine. Types: botanical, complex, geological, hydrological, zoological. They are categorized into two groups:

Nature monument

Nature monuments are separate unique natural creations that possess special environment-protected, scientific, aesthetic, educational, and cultural status.

Protected tract

Protected tracts are forest, steppe, wetland, and other outdrawn coherent landscapes that possess important scientific, environment-protected, and aesthetic status.

=== Habitat / Species Managed Areas ===
Habitat / Species Managed Areas may have multiple categorizations such as part of "Ukrainian objects of cultural heritage" or as scientific-research (educational) institutions. Such areas also may be part of bigger national nature parks and/or biosphere preserves as component parts of them. Among the most prominent of them are the botanic garden and zoology park of Askania-Nova, Sofiyivka arboretum, Trostyanets arboretum, and many others.

Botanic gardens

Arboreta (Dendrology park)

Zoos (Zoology park)

Exclusive parks (Park architecture monument)

== See also ==
- Emerald Network of Ukraine
- Red Book of Ukraine
