= Kachanivka =

Coordinates: 50°50′12″N 32°39′20″E

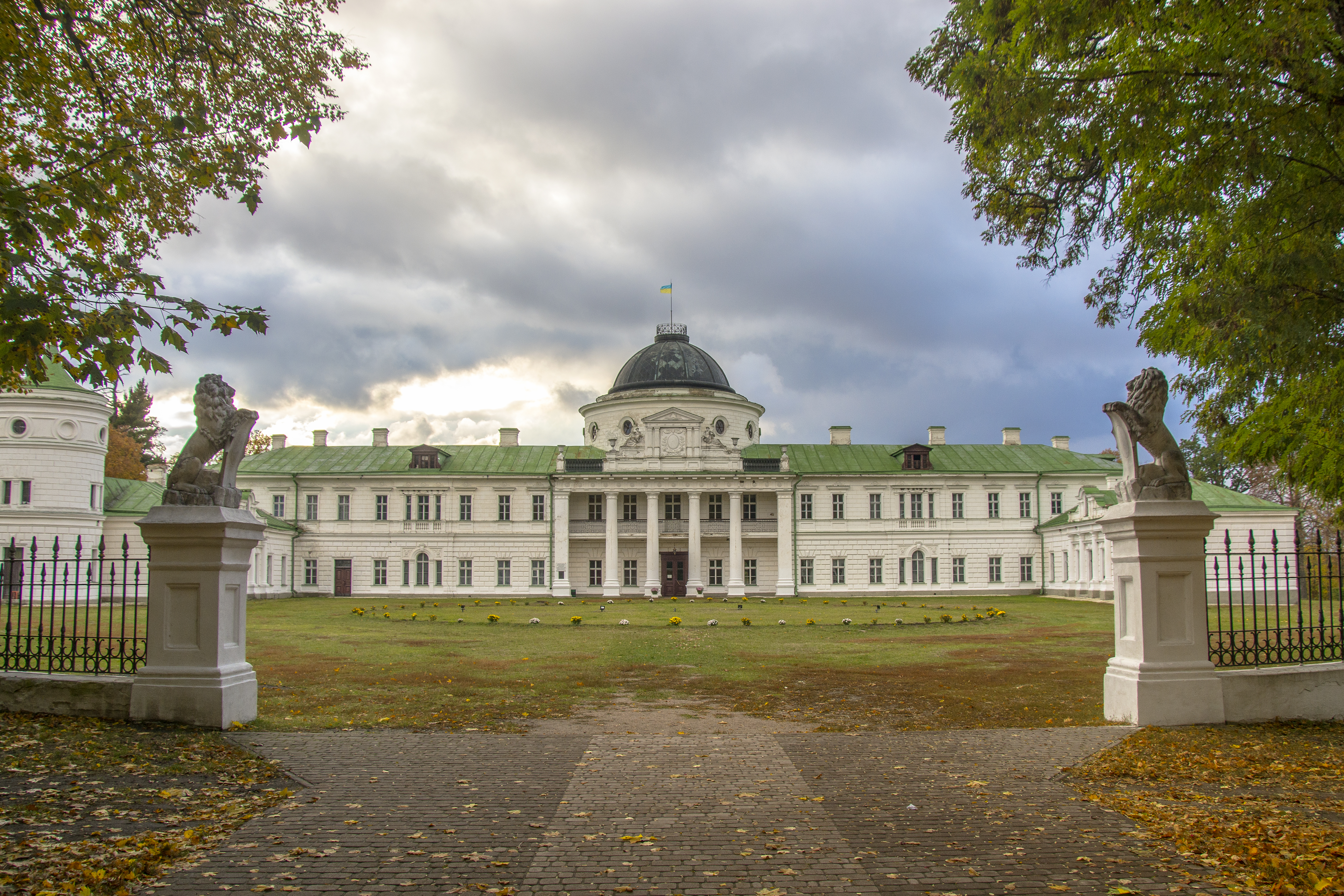
- Kachanivka Palace

Immovable Monument of National Significance of Ukraine
- Official name: Палацово-парковий комплекс “Качанівка” (Kachanivka Palace and Park Complex)
- Type: History, Architecture
- Reference no.: 250045-Н

The Kachanivka Palace (Ukrainian: Качанівка, romanized: Kachanivka; Russian: Качановка, romanized: Kachanovka) is one of the many country estates built by Pyotr Rumyantsev, Catherine II's viceroy of Little Russia. It stands on the bank of the Smosh River near the village of Petrushivka in Pryluky Raion, Chernihiv Oblast, Ukraine. It is perhaps the best known Rumyantsev estate in the region is the Gomel Residence.

The Kachanivka residence was erected in the 1770s to Neoclassical designs by Karl Blank. The church, orangery, aviary, water tower and several other buildings date from the 19th century. After Nikolay Rumyantsev's death, the property passed to the Tarnovsky family, descending from Cossack starshyna. Vasyl Tarnovsky was interested in the history of Ukraine and amassed a collection of weapons that had been owned by the hetmans of Ukraine. Among the 19th-century visitors to Kachanivka were Nikolai Gogol, Taras Shevchenko, Ilya Repin, Mikhail Vrubel, and Mikhail Glinka (who worked on his opera A Life for the Tsar in the summerhouse).

Although the Soviets nationalized the palace for use as a penal colony and tuberculosis hospital, the manor, including the extensive English park and several subsidiary outbuildings, is exceptionally well preserved. It has been designated a national cultural preserve since 1982 and was selected as one of the Seven Wondrous Castles and Palaces of Ukraine.
