= Marble Cave (Crimea) =

Cave in Crimea

Coordinates: 44°47′49″N 34°16′43″E

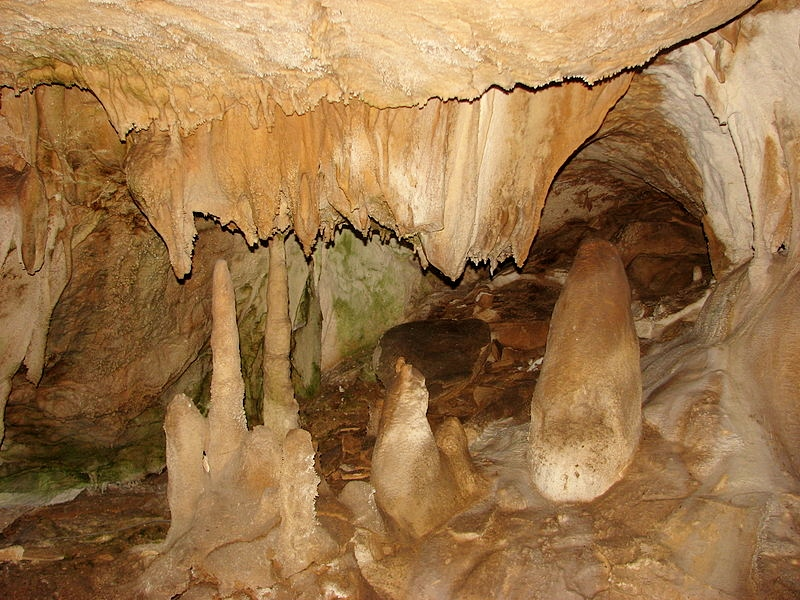
A view inside the cave

Marble Caves (Russian: Мра́морная пещера, Ukrainian: Мармурова печера, Crimean Tatar: Mermer qobası, Мермер къобасы) is a cave in Crimea, at the lower plateau of Chatyr-Dag, a mountainous massif. It is a popular tourist attraction and one of the most visited caves in Europe.

Due to its uniqueness, Marble Cave became famous worldwide. Speleologists consider it among the top five most beautiful caves of the planet, and one of the Seven Natural Wonders of Ukraine. In 1992, it was included in the International Association of Equipped Caves.

== History ==
In 1987, the Simferopol speleology team discovered a cave with a complex system of halls and galleries between Bin Bash-Koba (Thousand Heads) and Suuk-Koba (Cold). The new cave, that lay at the altitude of 920 metres (3,020 ft) above sea level, was called Marble (initially, also the name "Afghan" was used), due to the fact it that was formed in marble limestone. In 1988, the Onyx-tour center for speleology tourism established sightseeing tours, concrete paths were laid, and lighting was installed.

The tour goes through the Fairy Tale Gallery, Tiger Path, with hundreds of various stalactites, the Reconstruction Room, the largest cave room of Crimea and one of the largest equipped rooms in Europe with a length of 100 metres and height of 28 metres, the Pink Room, with stone roses covering the top of the room, the Palace Hall, with "Queen" and "King" columns, and the Hope and Balcony Room. A stalactite "forest" leads to the Luster Room. Dozens of "chandeliers" hang down from the ceiling covered with coralite "flowers", and some of them almost reach the floor. Here is the place where the tour ends, although the cave has four more rooms: Landslide, Channel, Chocolate, and Geliktite.

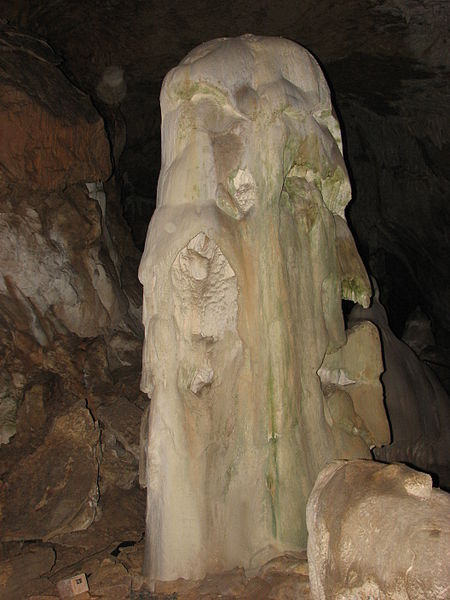

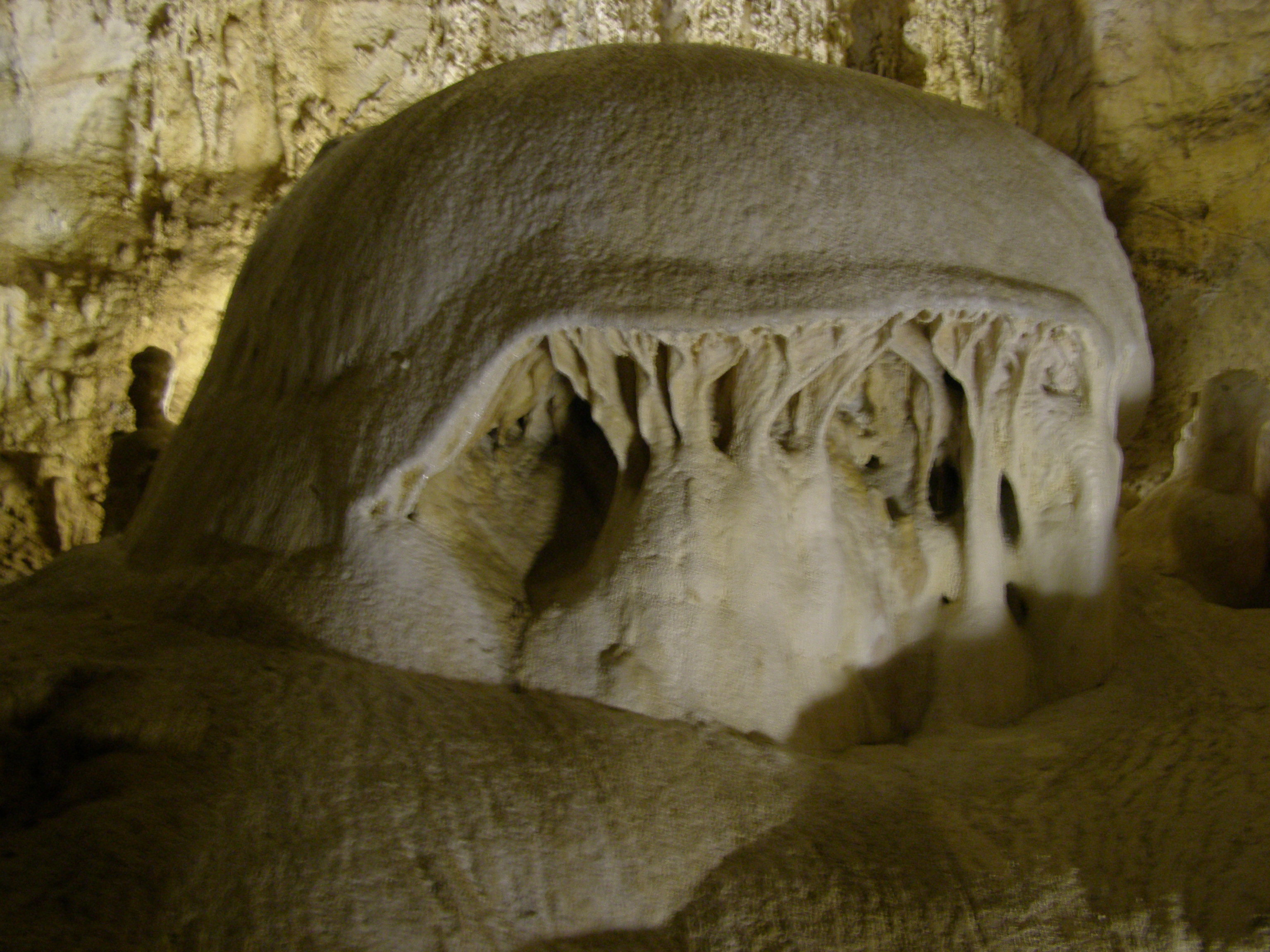

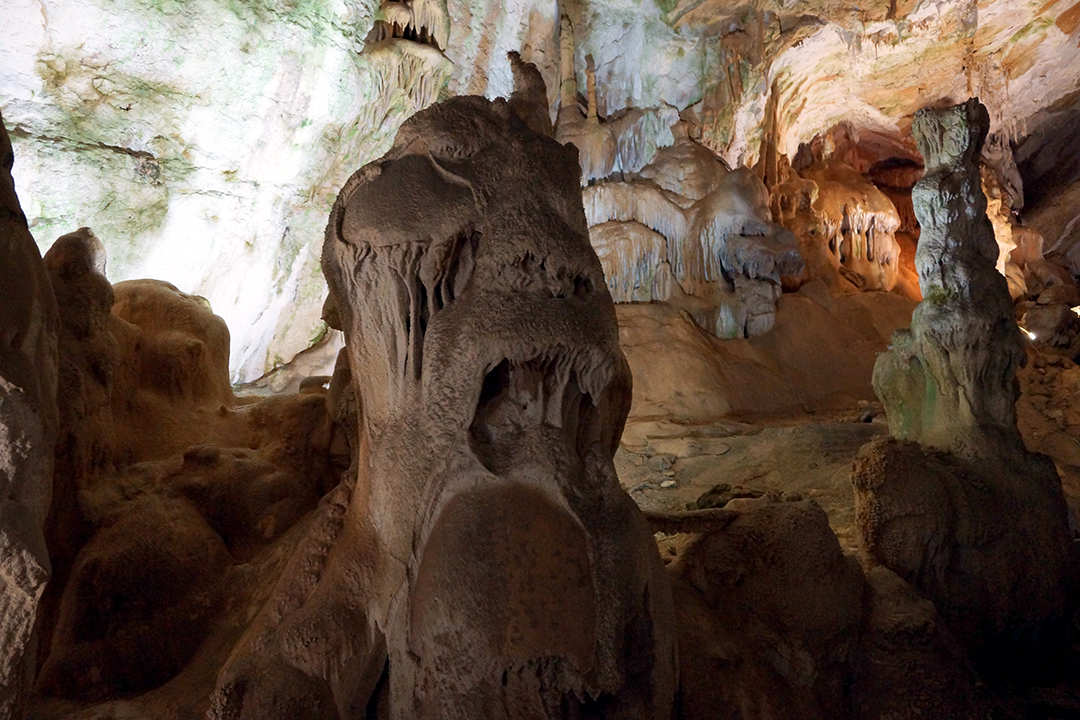

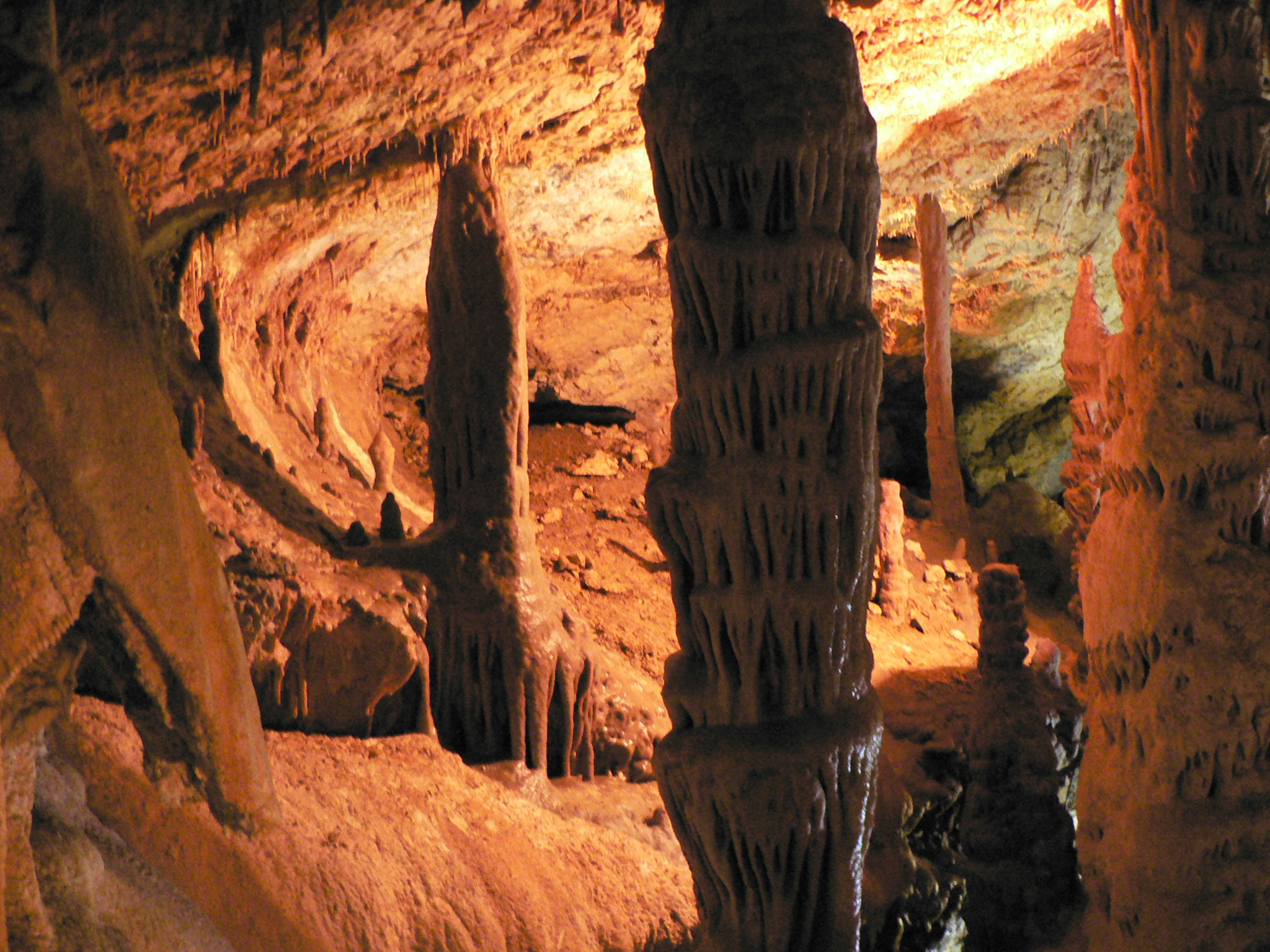

== See also ==
- Chatyr-Dag
