= Derkul Stud Farm =

Stud farm in Luhansk Oblast, Ukraine

- Деркульський кінний завод
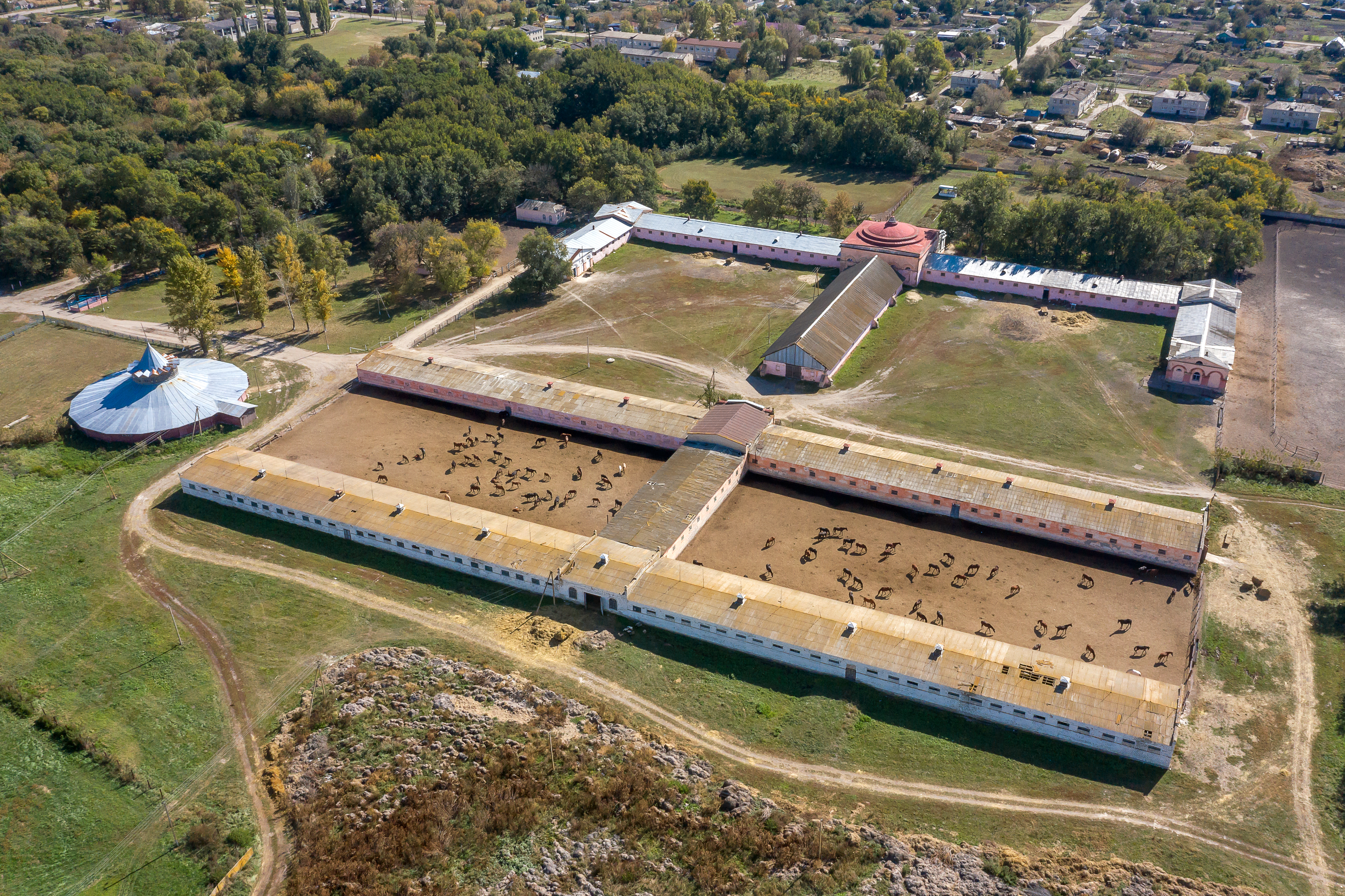
- Aerial view of the Derkul Stud Farm (2019)
- Interactive map of the Derkul Stud Farm area

General information
- Location: Danylivka, Luhansk Oblast, Ukraine
- Coordinates: 49°07′48″N 39°37′02″E
- Opened: 22 April 1765

Immovable Monument of National Significance of Ukraine
- Official name: Комплекс споруд Деркульського кінного заводу, який відвідав радянський воєнний та державний діяч С. М. Будьонний (Structure complex of the Derkul Stud Farm, which was visited by the Soviet military and statesman S. M. Budonny)
- Type: Architecture, History, Science and Technology
- Reference no.: 120011-Н

Derkul Stud Farm no. 63 (Ukrainian: Деркульський кінний завод № 63) is one of the oldest stud farms in Ukraine. It was established near the khutir (now village) of Danylivka in Luhansk Oblast.

== History ==
The Derkul Stud Farm was established according to an ukase of Russian Empress Catherine II on 22 April 1765.

The khutir of Danyliv near River Derkul was chosen as the construction site. The farm was opened on 25 October 1767 with 73 horses. It had 469 horses by 1777, and around 900 by 1787. Until 2010, the stud farm received subsidies from the state. In 2013, it became a branch of the state-owned enterprise "Horse Breeding of Ukraine". As of 2021, there were about 150 horses. Breeding work was carried out on the farm, resulting in the creation of a Ukrainian riding breed.

== Composition ==
Structure complex of the Derkul Stud Farm is an architectural, historic, and scientific and technological monument of national significance with the protection number 120011-Н.

The complex includes the central stables, the Japanese-style manège, and the office building.

=== Central stables ===
Built in late 17th – early 19th centuries.

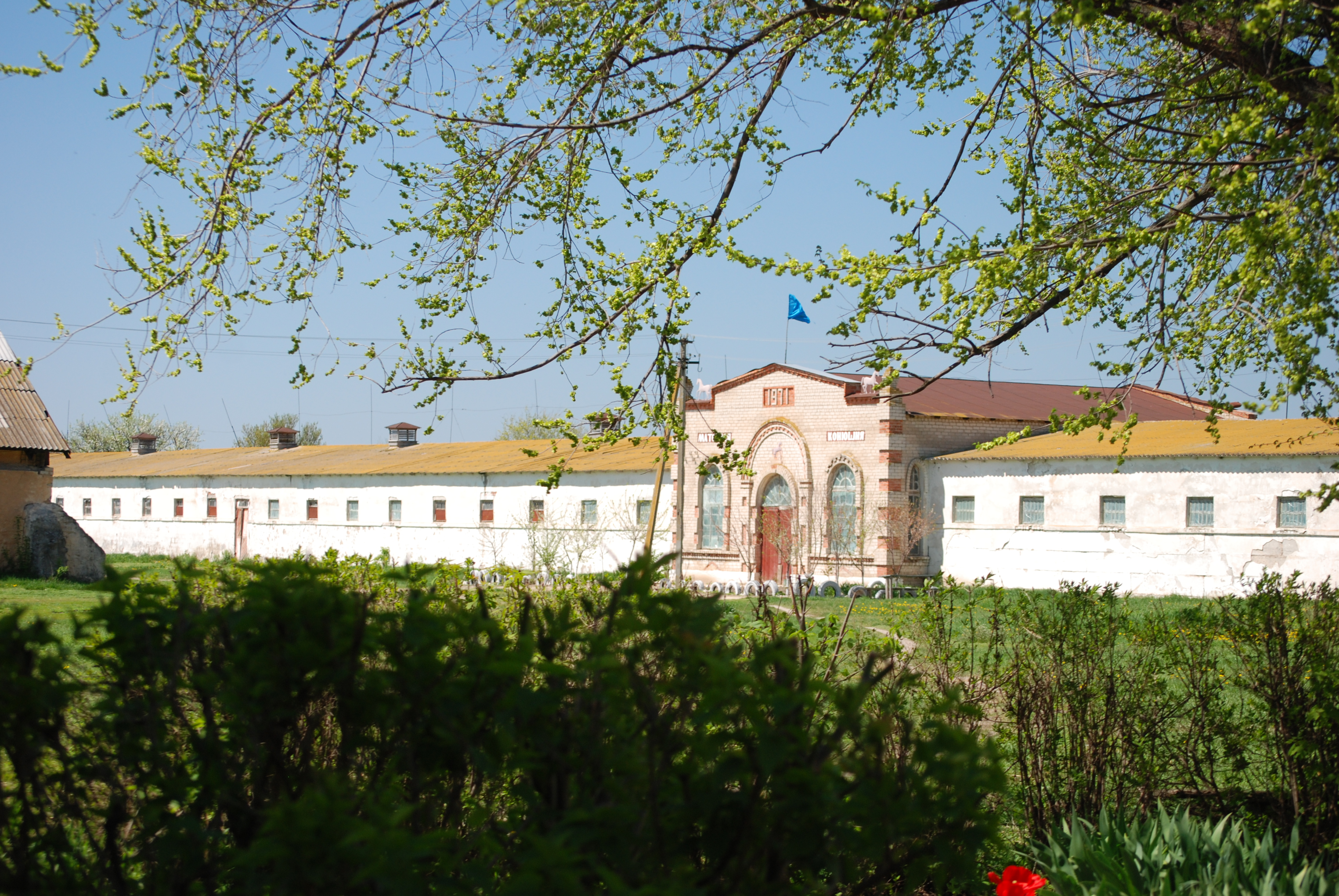
View in 2010

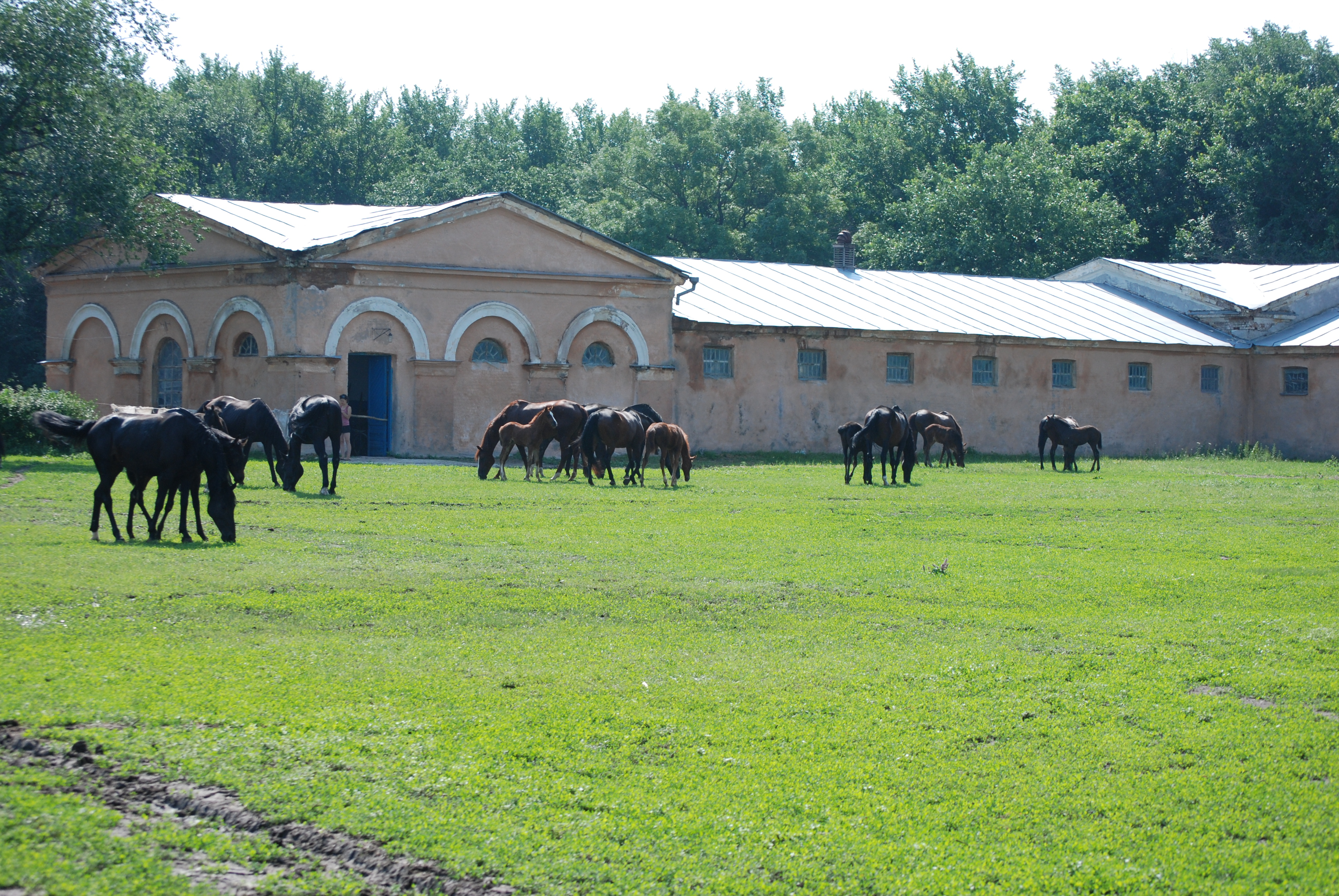
View in 2011

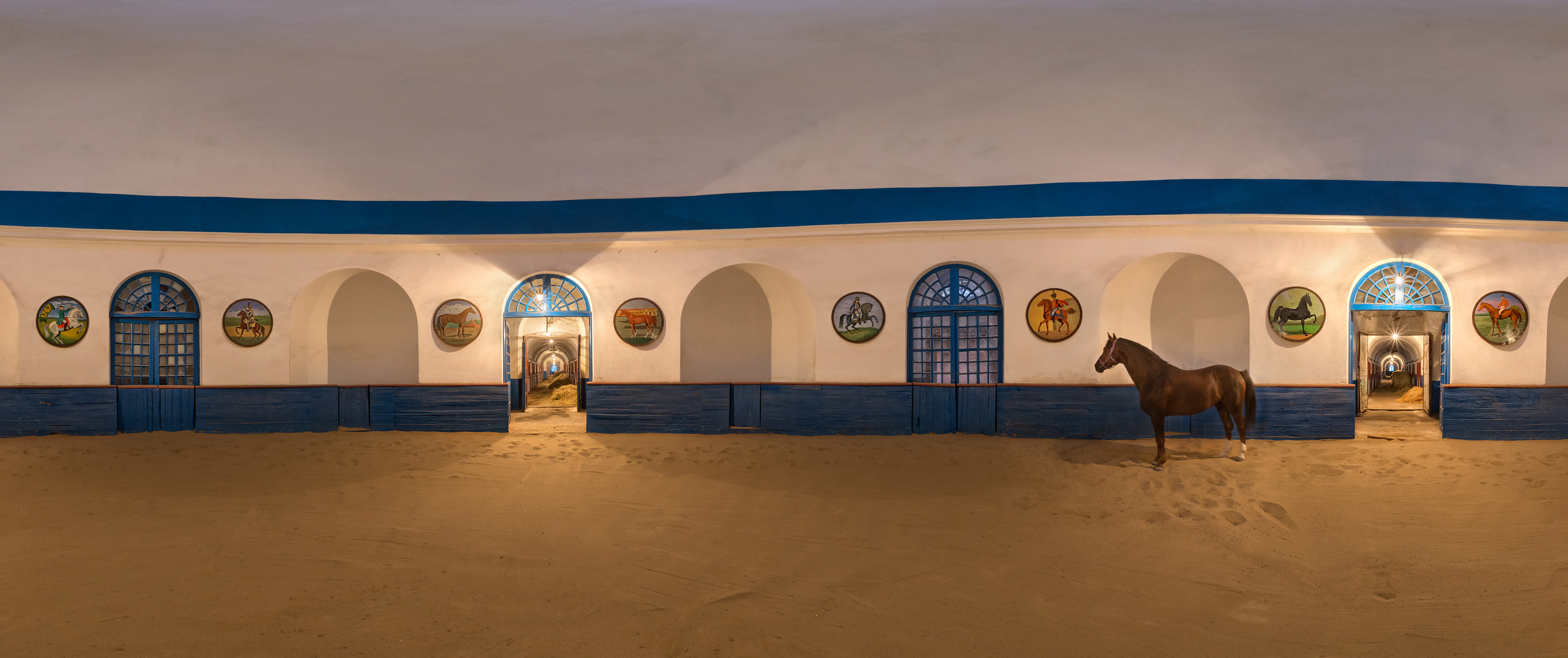
Interior in 2018

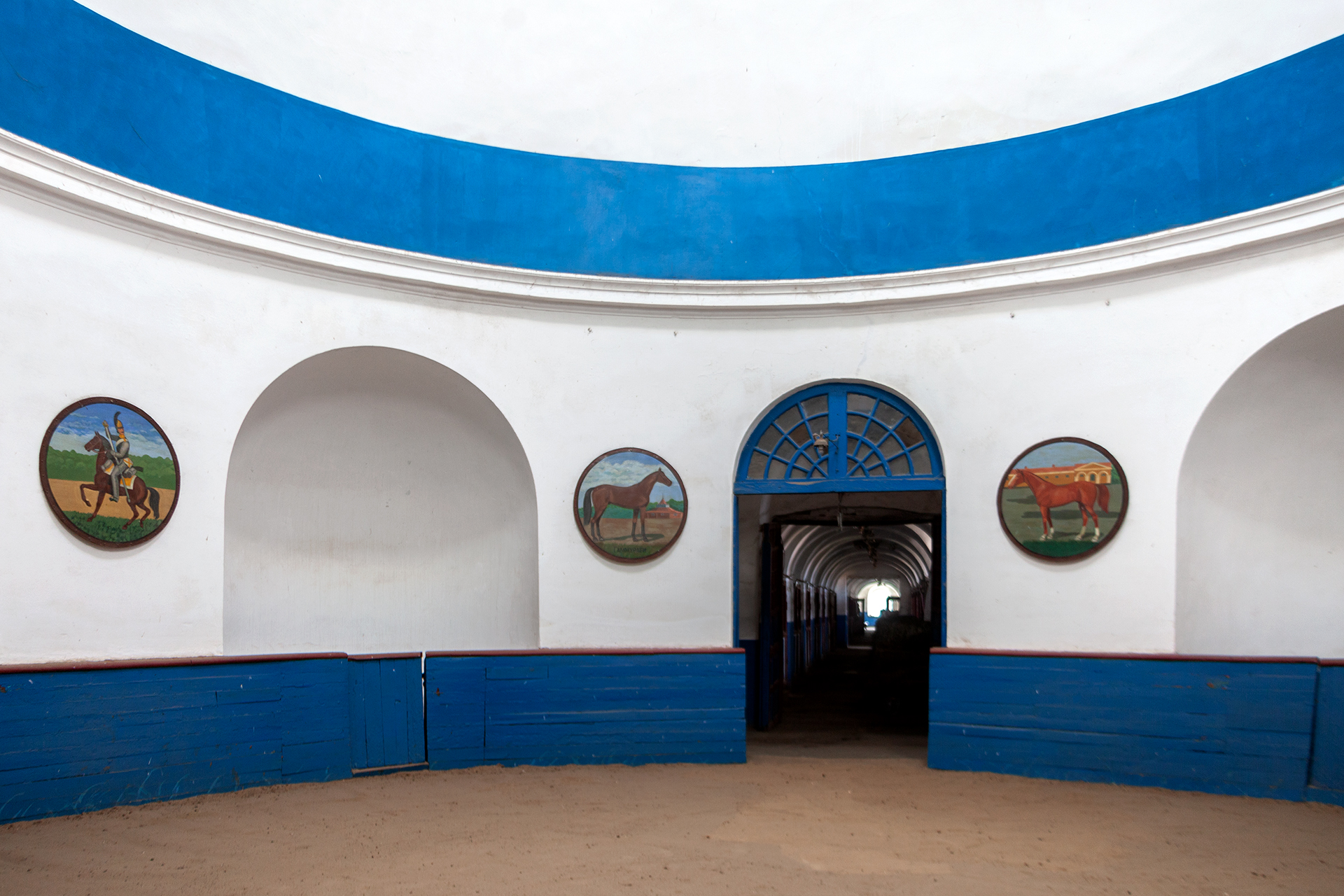
Interior in 2019

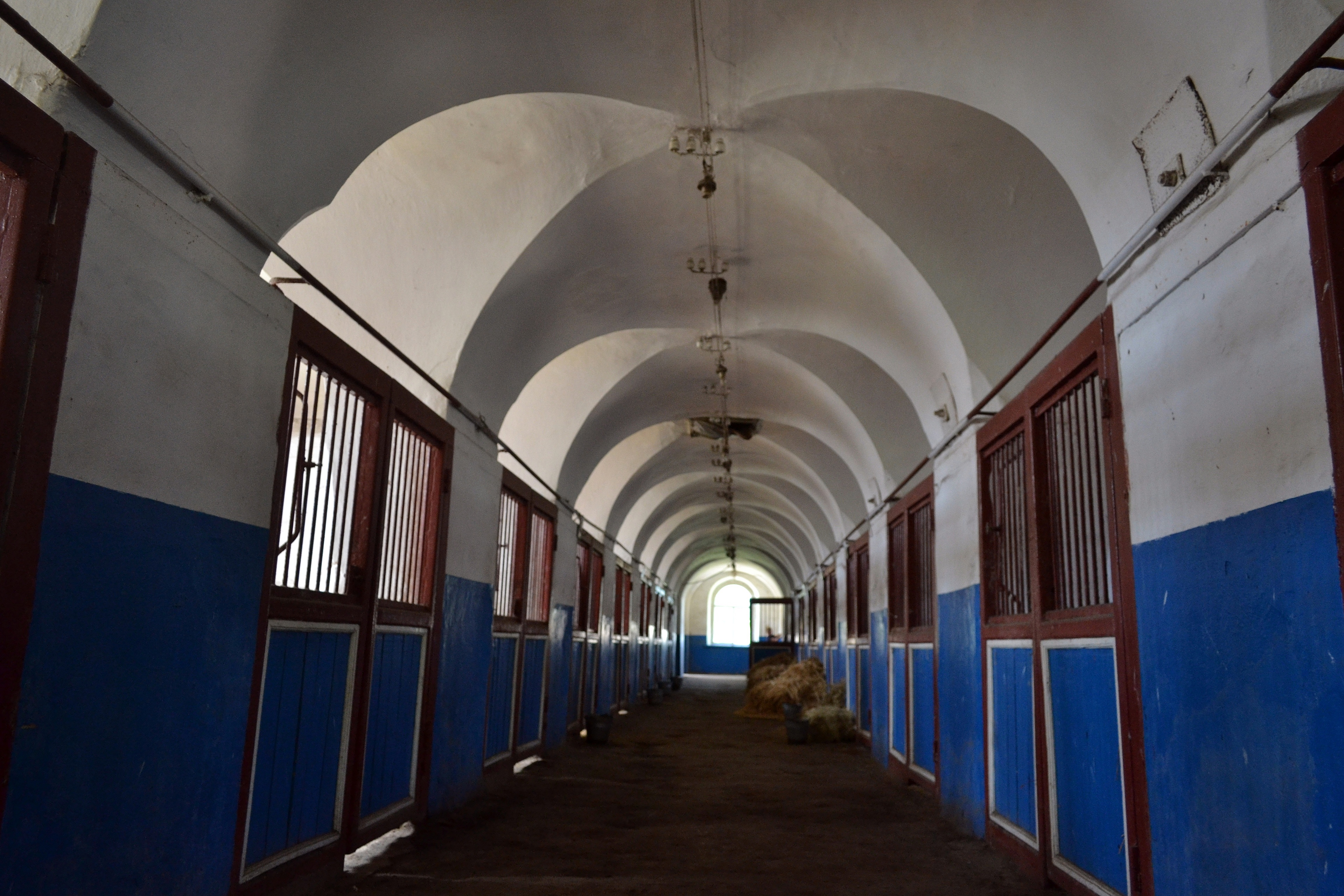
Interior in 2019

=== Japanese-style manège ===
Built in 1897.

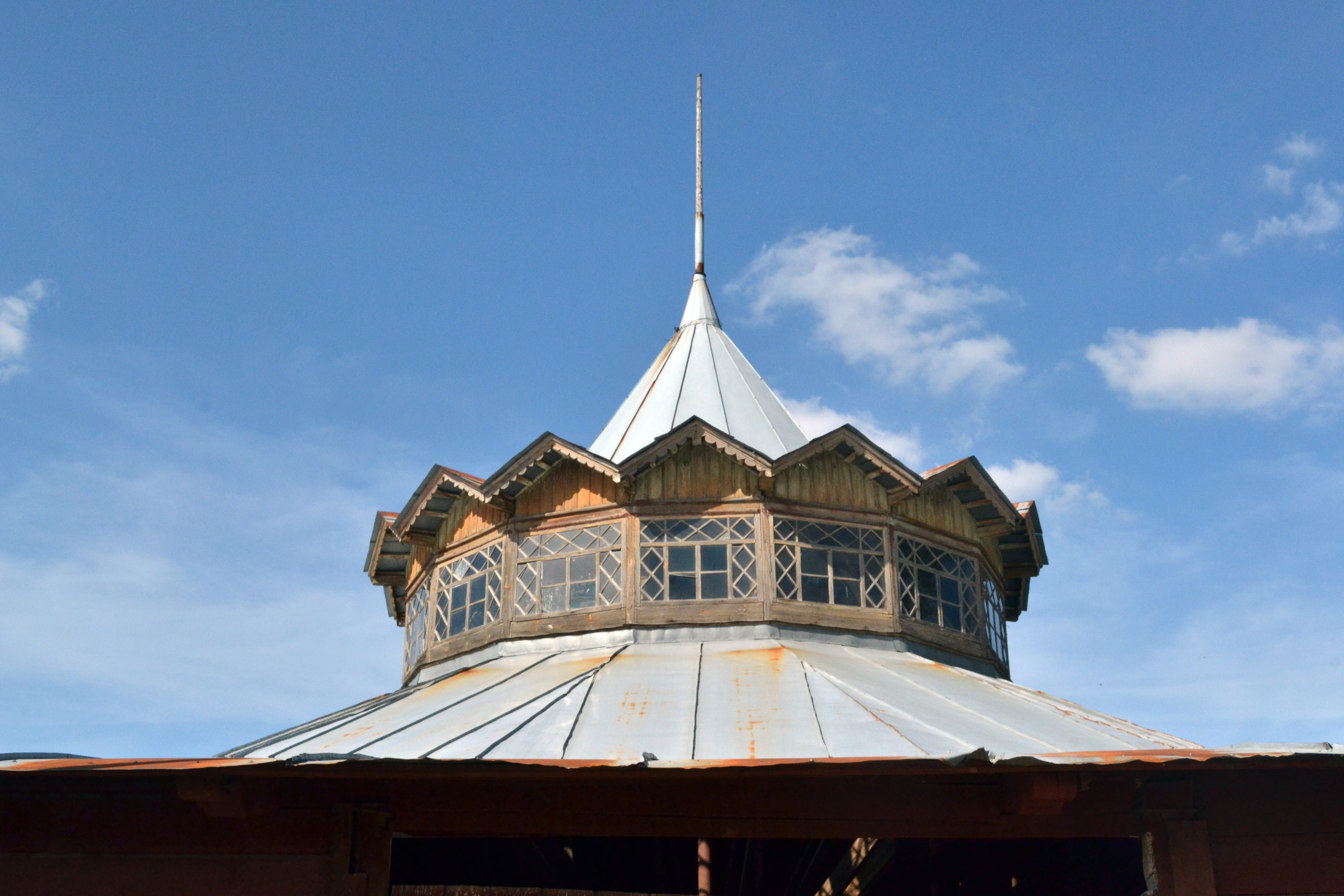
Top section in 2019

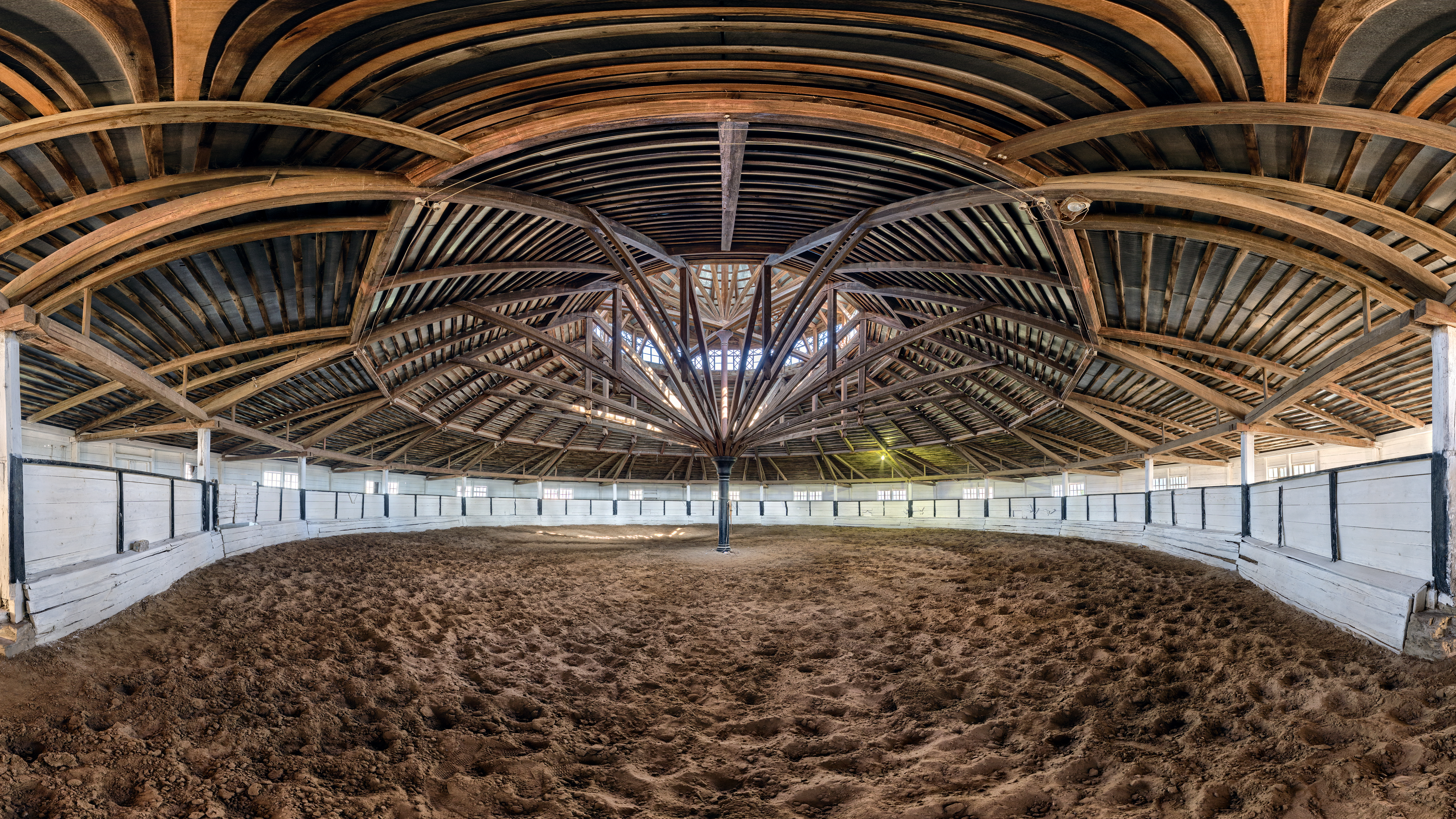
Interior in 2019

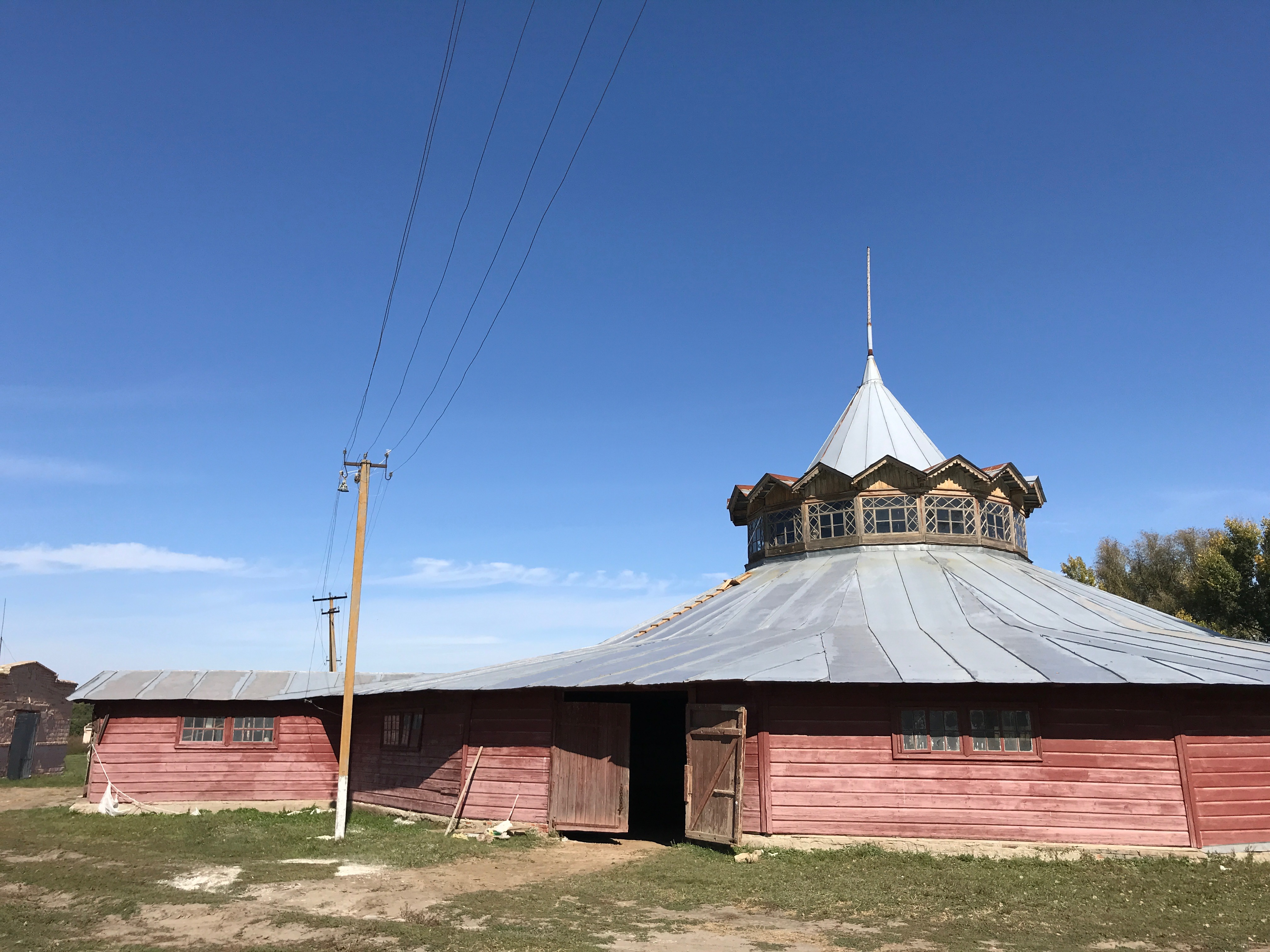
General view in 2019

=== Office building ===
Built in the mid-19th century.

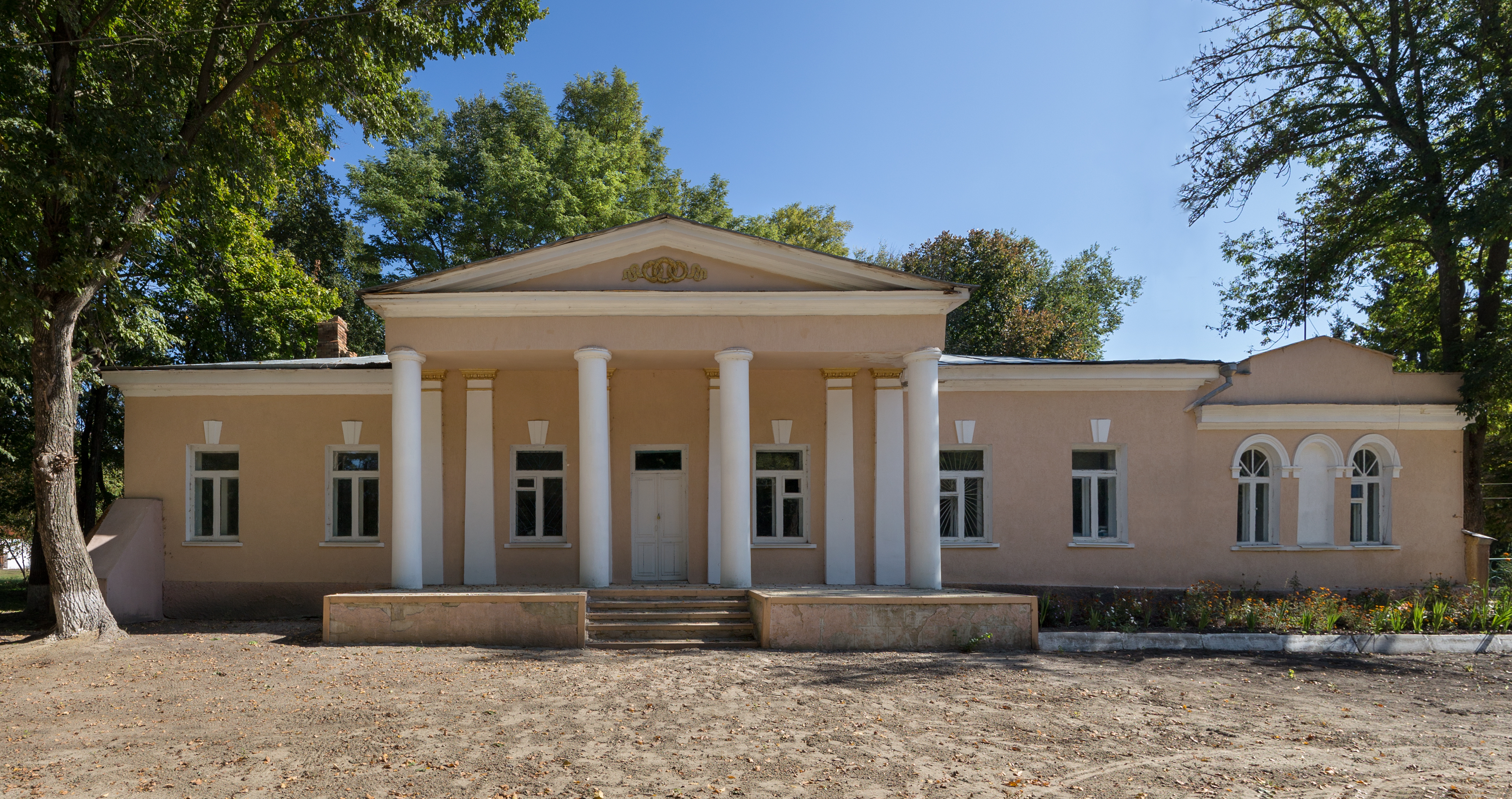
Exterior in 2019

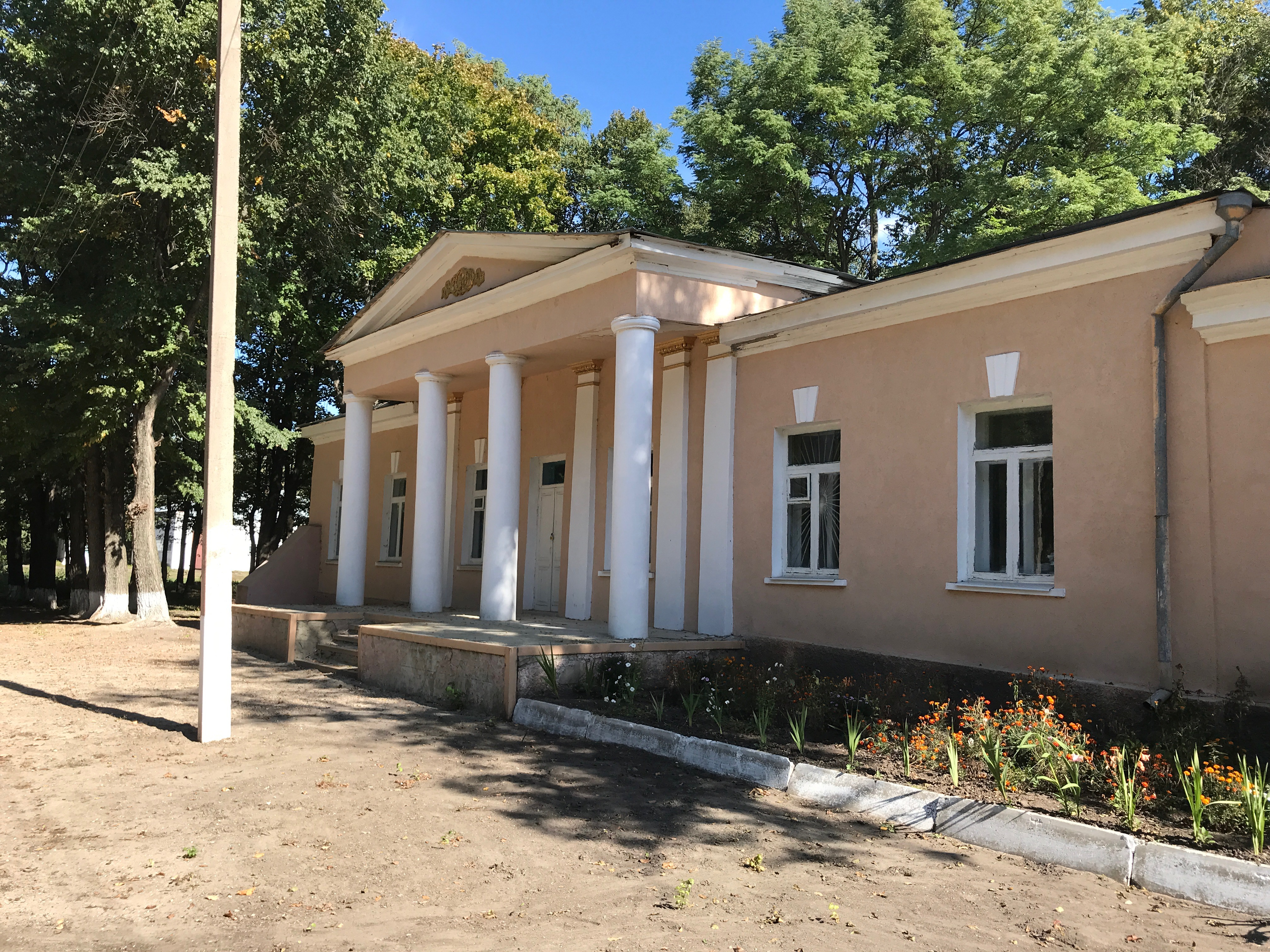
Exterior in 2019
