= Askania-Nova =

Nature reserve in Kherson Oblast, Ukraine

- IUCN category Ib (wilderness area)
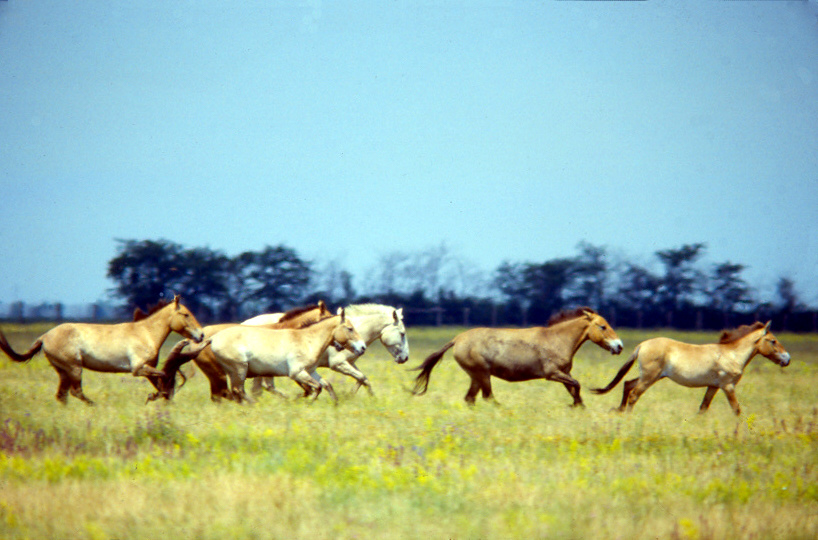
- Przewalski's horses (Equus ferus przewalskii)

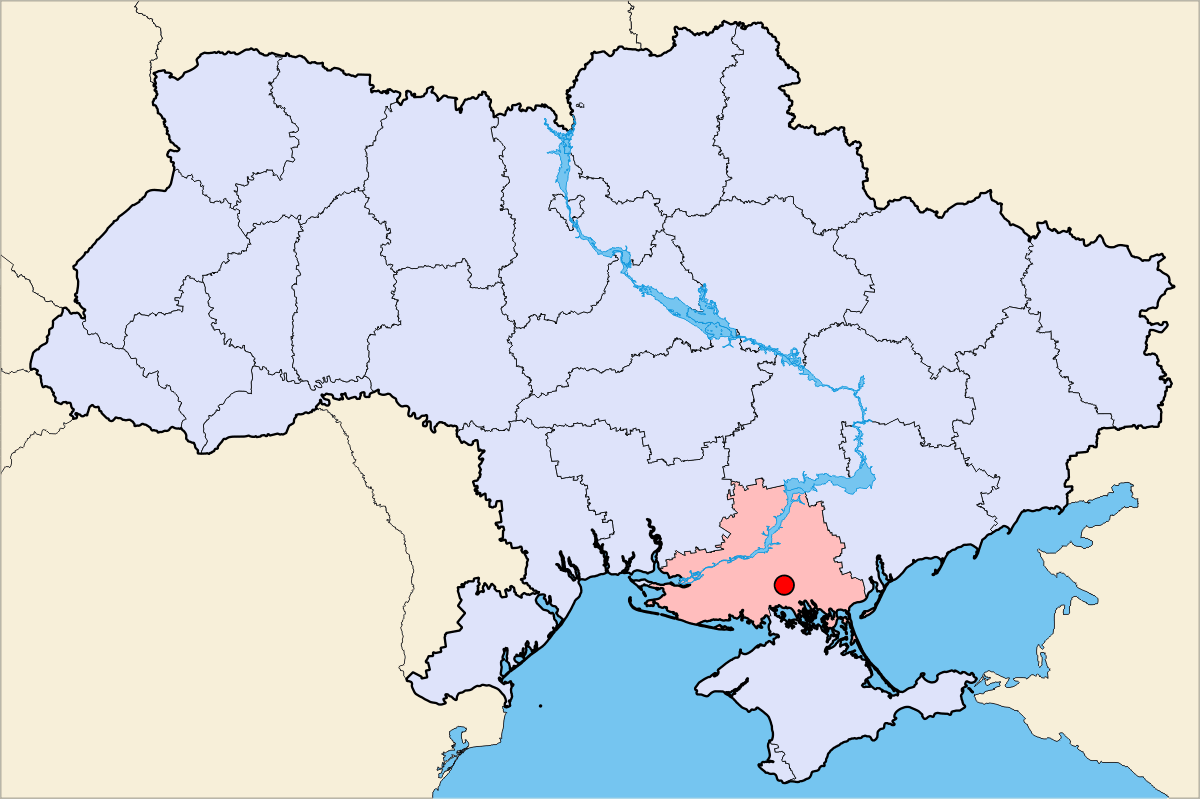
- Location of Askania-Nova in Ukraine
- Location: Askania-Nova (settlement), Kakhovka Raion, Kherson Oblast, Ukraine
- Coordinates: 46°27′07″N 33°52′51″E
- Area: 333.08 km^{2} (128.60 sq mi)
- Established: 1898
- Governing body: National Academy of Agrarian Sciences of Ukraine
- Website: http://askania-nova-zapovidnik.gov.ua/en/

Askania-Nova (Асканія-Нова), fully titled in Ukrainian: Біосферний заповідник «Асканія-Нова» ім. Фальц-Фейна) is a biosphere reserve located in Kherson Oblast, Ukraine, within the dry Taurida steppe near Oleshky Sands. An active member of the UNESCO Man and the Biosphere Programme, the reserve maintains and conserves native steppe habitat and endemic species while also caring for rare and exotic animal species from around the world. It is also a research institute of the Academy of Agricultural Sciences of Ukraine. The reserve consists of a zoological park, as well as over 33,000 hectares (81,000+ acres) of grassland habitat for herds of ungulate mammals. There are also many botanical (dendrological) gardens, featuring hundreds of plant species, and a vast open territory of virgin steppe. Askania-Nova is listed on the Tentative List of World Heritage Sites in Ukraine.

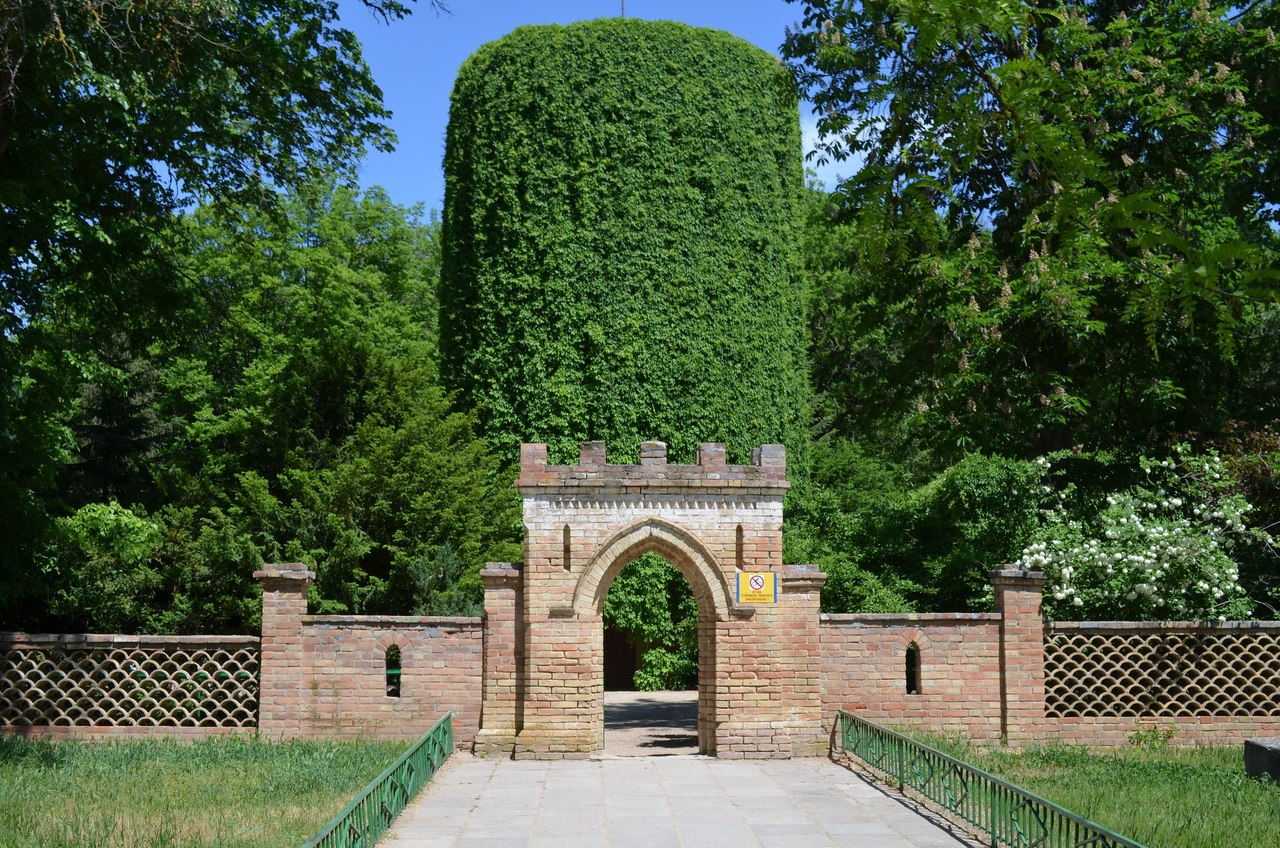

== History ==
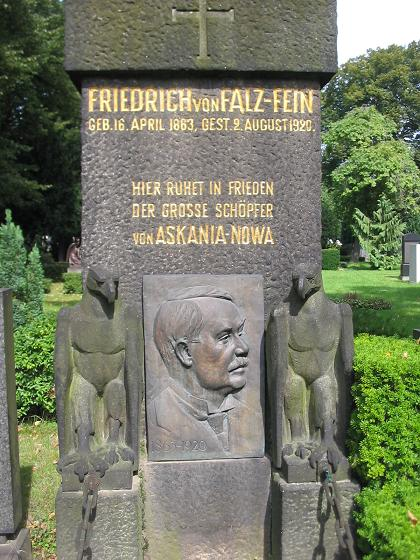
The tomb of Falz-Fein

The nature reserve was established in 1898 by Friedrich-Jacob Eduardovych Falz-Fein (1863–1920) around the German colony of Askania-Nova, which only in 1890 became an organized settlement, Khutir.

In March 1919, Askania-Nova was confiscated from the Falz-Fein family by the Red Army as part of the state nationalization programme. The last owner refused to evacuate to Germany. She was Sofia-Louise Bohdanivna (Gottlieb) Knauff (1835–1919), the mother of Friedrich Falz-Fein. Her refusal resulted in her summary execution by two Red Army guardsmen who shot her for failing to surrender her estate in Khorly (today a port in Kherson Oblast). On April 1, 1919, Askania-Nova was declared a People's Sanctuary Park by a decree of the Council of People's Commissars of the Ukrainian SSR; while on February 8, 1921, it was reorganized into a State Steppe Reserve of the Ukrainian SSR. The main purposes of the reserve were to preserve and study the environment of the virgin steppe, as well as possibly to acclimatize and study a larger number of animal and plant types.

Askania-Nova became a scientific-steppe station, a zoo-technical station with breeding farms, a phyto-technical station, and included various other scientific institutions. Notably, the zoo and botanical garden were greatly expanded. Part of the reserve included portions of steppe reserve, an acclimatization zoo, and an arboretum. From 1932 to 1956, the reserve was transformed into the All-Union scientific-research institute for the hybridization and acclimatization of animals of M. Ivanov. It consisted of 12 departments (including the botanical garden, steppe reserve steppe, and zoo), nine laboratories, conducting experimental farming, and four breeding centres for agricultural animals. The institute became the centre of scientific-researching works in the field of breed creation and the major hub for breeding farms. During both World War I and World War II, the reserve was devastated.

In 1983, Askania-Nova was reorganized into a biosphere reserve and the following year it was designated as the Soviet member of the World Network of Biosphere Reserves of UNESCO. After the fall of the Soviet Union, in 1993, Ukraine confirmed the status of the biosphere reserve Askania-Nova. In 2008, Askania was named one of Seven Wonders of Ukraine.

=== Russian occupation and damage ===
In March 2022, following Russian occupation of the region, administration of Askania-Nova was taken over by Russia, which reclassified the steppes to hunting grounds. Shortly thereafter, photographs showing Russian soldiers alongside hunted deer carcasses from the park were posted on social media. Russian troops further caused damage to the park by driving heavy equipment through protected steppe areas, digging trenches, and causing fires. Askania-Nova's Ukrainian administration continues to operate in absentia, with international donations contributing towards assisting former employees forced to leave the institution.

In March 2023, Russian authorities appointed collaborator Dmytro Meshcheryakov as the reserve's director. In April 2026, Meshcheryakov was found guilty of criminal offenses related to the illegal seizure and use of the reserve during the temporary occupation of Kherson region.

In August 2024, the Ukrainian governor of Kherson Oblast, Oleksandr Prokudin, said that the reserve had "ceased to exist" due to looting by Russian forces, the transfer of its wildlife to Crimea and Russia, and flooding caused by the destruction of the Kakhovka Dam. However, the claims were denied by the reserve's director, Viktor Shapoval, who said that the reserve had suffered damage while confirming that animals were taken by Russia, adding that other wildlife had died from neglect and that large parts of its steppes had burned down.

==== 2026 fires ====
In June 2026, two large-scale fires devastated the reserve. Based on Sentinel-2 satellite imagery analysis, the fires burned 1,928 hectares of the protected "Pivdennyi" (Southern) sector. An additional 566.6 hectares of agricultural land in the buffer zone were also destroyed.

The fires destroyed virgin steppe habitats containing plant communities listed in Ukraine's Red Book, including Ukrainian feather grass (Stipa ucrainica), hairy feather grass (Stipa capillata), and Lessing's feather grass (Stipa lessingiana). Other affected species include Taliev's knapweed (Rhaponticoides taliewii), Henning's milkvetch (Astragalus henningii), and Regel's onion (Allium regelianum).

Ten sections of the reserve's territory were completely destroyed by the fire, and several other sections sustained partial damage. During the summer months, the number of burned sites exceeded two dozen, with the total area of burned territory within the protected steppe exceeding 3,000 hectares.

The reserve's administration stated the fires were the result of military activity by Russian occupying forces deployed on the reserve's territory. According to reports from occupation-controlled media, the fires were allegedly caused by the downing of a UAV.

==== Animal losses and removal ====
The occupation has caused unprecedented damage to the reserve's animal populations. The scale of ungulate mortality has exceeded anything recorded since World War II. According to reserve officials, the deaths are attributable to stress from military activity, neglect, drought, and improper care.

The occupation administration organized the removal of valuable animals from the reserve. Pairs of Chapman's zebras, Przewalski's horses, bison, and David's deer were transported to the "Rostovsky" reserve, while the majority of animals were handed over to the private Taigan Lion Park in Crimea. There have been documented cases of animals being sold on the black market. Before the occupation, about 3,500 specimens representing 120 species lived in the reserve.

During the winter of 2023–2024, African Cape buffalo died at the reserve because they were not timely transferred to winter enclosures.

== The biosphere reserve ==
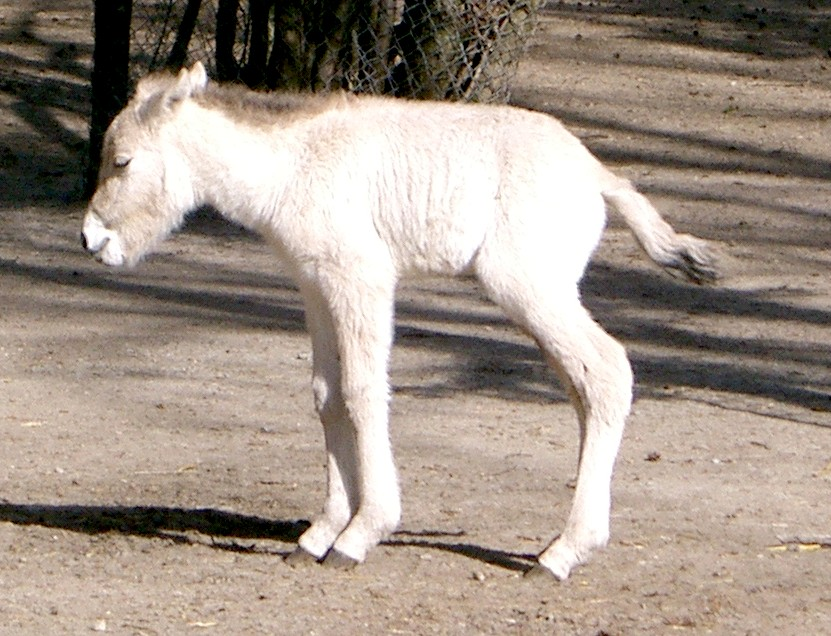
A two-day-old foal born to a mare of the rare Przewalski's Horse

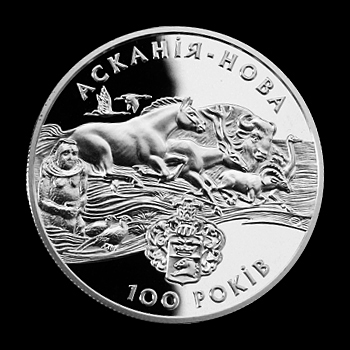
Jubilee coin dedicated to 100th Anniversary of Ascania Nova Reserve

The reserve consists of the acclimatization zoo, arboretum (2.1 km², or 518.9 acre), and virgin steppe sanctuary (110 km², or 42.5 sq mi, the last such area in Europe) and has total area of 333.08 km^{2} (128.60 sq mi). The Askania-Nova wetland Great Chapli Depression is registered on the International list of Ramsar Convention and has an area of 4x6 km. Part of the sanctuary include a small town and six villages with total population of 10,000 people (1997). There is no direct railroad station in the area, and the sanctuary can be reached by bus.

The reserve contains forest belts covering 234 hectares, approximately 1% of its territory. Planting was carried out in four stages from 1932 to 2001.

=== Flora and fauna ===
More than 200 species of perennial, foliaceous and coniferous plants were brought-in from different parts of the world and planted in the dendrologic garden between 1885 and 1902. About 600 higher plants (both perennial and annual plants), 16 species of which were entered to the Red Data Book of Ukraine, have been preserved in their primary natural form.

Larger animals on the reserve include the common eland, an African antelope being studied at the facility for its milk production (as a possible alternative to dairy), Ankole cattle, Cape buffalo, emus, ostriches, plains bison, Indian gaur (and domesticated mithun), Turkomen markhor, fallow deer, wapiti, guanaco, llamas, white-bearded wildebeest, Grevy's zebra, and hundreds of bird species.

The reserve is known for its herd of Przewalski's horses, the largest group kept in captivity, living on an area around 30 km^{2} (12 sq mi). The Turkmenian kulan (Equus hemionus kulan), an endemic Central Asian wild ass, has thrived and been reintroduced. Other species include the aoudad (or Barbary sheep), Armenian mouflon, Bactrian camel, Eurasian beaver, golden pheasant, grey crowned crane, Indian peafowl and raccoon dog (or tanuki).

The biosphere reserve has been designated an Important Bird Area (IBA) by BirdLife International because it supports healthy populations of red-breasted, bar-headed and greater white-fronted geese, mute swan, ruddy shelduck, demoiselle and common cranes, black-winged pratincole, and pallid harriers.

== Climate ==
Climate data for Askania-Nova (1991–2020 normals, extremes 1910-2005)
Month	Jan	Feb	Mar	Apr	May	Jun	Jul	Aug	Sep	Oct	Nov	Dec	Year
Record high °C (°F)	16.3 (61.3)	20.6 (69.1)	23.9 (75.0)	28.1 (82.6)	34.4 (93.9)	37.7 (99.9)	40.1 (104.2)	40.3 (104.5)	36.6 (97.9)	33.5 (92.3)	25.4 (77.7)	16.1 (61.0)	40.3 (104.5)
Mean daily maximum °C (°F)	1.9 (35.4)	3.4 (38.1)	9.2 (48.6)	16.5 (61.7)	23.2 (73.8)	27.8 (82.0)	30.9 (87.6)	30.5 (86.9)	24.2 (75.6)	16.6 (61.9)	8.7 (47.7)	3.7 (38.7)	16.4 (61.5)
Daily mean °C (°F)	−1.5 (29.3)	−0.7 (30.7)	3.9 (39.0)	10.2 (50.4)	16.3 (61.3)	21.2 (70.2)	23.9 (75.0)	23.3 (73.9)	17.2 (63.0)	10.7 (51.3)	4.3 (39.7)	0.4 (32.7)	10.8 (51.4)
Mean daily minimum °C (°F)	−4.6 (23.7)	−4.3 (24.3)	−0.6 (30.9)	3.9 (39.0)	9.5 (49.1)	14.7 (58.5)	17.0 (62.6)	16.3 (61.3)	11.0 (51.8)	5.6 (42.1)	0.8 (33.4)	−2.6 (27.3)	5.6 (42.1)
Record low °C (°F)	−30.3 (−22.5)	−32.5 (−26.5)	−22.5 (−8.5)	−8.7 (16.3)	−2.6 (27.3)	0.9 (33.6)	7.4 (45.3)	3.8 (38.8)	−4.8 (23.4)	−11.2 (11.8)	−22.4 (−8.3)	−24.3 (−11.7)	−32.5 (−26.5)
Average precipitation mm (inches)	28 (1.1)	26 (1.0)	28 (1.1)	32 (1.3)	39 (1.5)	52 (2.0)	38 (1.5)	35 (1.4)	34 (1.3)	29 (1.1)	36 (1.4)	31 (1.2)	408 (16.1)
Average precipitation days (≥ 1.0 mm)	6.4	5.4	6.1	5.2	5.9	6.1	4.2	3.5	4.3	4.5	5.8	6.2	63.6
Average relative humidity (%)	86.2	82.8	76.7	68.9	67.3	64.0	58.8	57.3	66.1	76.8	85.1	87.0	73.1
Mean monthly sunshine hours	68	94	144	209	284	302	339	315	242	170	80	54	2,301
Source 1: NCEI
Source 2: Climatebase.ru (extremes)

== Access ==
The sanctuary is located in a relatively remote area. Its territory completely overlaps the Askania Nova municipality which beside its main town includes five small rural settlements: Illinka (569), Komysh (313), Molochne (762), Novyi Etap (72), Pytomnyk (859); and a separate rural municipality of Markeyevo (783) consisting a former village of the same name. Towards the sanctuary and the town of Askania-Nova leads a "spur" of the regional route P47 which branches out from the main route near the village of Chkalove (Novotroitske Raion). The main route of P47 runs from Kherson to Henichesk and intersects European routes E58 and E105.

== In popular culture ==
- The Winter Horses by Philip Kerr (ISBN 978-0-385-75543-6) - a historical fiction novel about two people at Askaniya-Nova in Ukraine attempting to save Przewalski's horses from the dinner tables of Nazi soldiers during World War II.

== See also ==
- Ramsar Classification System for Wetland Type
