= List of World Heritage Sites in Ukraine =

Location of World Heritage Sites in Ukraine. Grey dots indicate the Wooden tserkvas sites, blue are the sites of the Struve Geodetic Arc, and green the Ancient and Primeval Beech Forests.

The United Nations Educational, Scientific and Cultural Organization (UNESCO) designates World Heritage Sites of outstanding universal value to cultural or natural heritage which have been nominated by countries that are signatories to the UNESCO World Heritage Convention, established in 1972. Cultural heritage consists of monuments (such as architectural works, monumental sculptures, or inscriptions), groups of buildings, and sites (including archaeological sites). Natural heritage is defined as natural features (consisting of physical and biological formations), geological and physiographical formations (including habitats of threatened species of animals and plants), and natural sites which are important from the point of view of science, conservation or natural beauty. Ukraine officially adopted the UNESCO Convention and became an independent member on 12 October 1988, while still officially being a Union Republic of the Soviet Union (prior to its dissolution in 1991).

As of 2026, there are eight World Heritage Sites listed in Ukraine, seven of which are cultural sites and one of which, the Ancient and Primeval Beech Forests of the Carpathians and Other Regions of Europe, is a natural site. The first site listed was "Kyiv: Saint-Sophia Cathedral and Related Monastic Buildings, Kyiv-Pechersk Lavra", in 1990. The most recent site listed was the Historic Centre of Odesa, in 2023. The site was immediately listed as endangered because of the 2022 Russian invasion, the sites of Kyiv and Lviv were added to the endangered list as well later in the same year. In 2026, Tauric Chersonese and its Chora was also listed as endangered due to damage caused by new construction and archaeological excavations carried out by the Russian authorities. Three sites are transnational: the Wooden Tserkvas are shared with Poland, the Struve Geodetic Arc is shared with nine countries, and the Ancient and Primeval Beech Forests are shared with 17 countries. In addition, Ukraine has 17 sites on its tentative list.

== World Heritage Sites ==
UNESCO lists sites under ten criteria; each entry must meet at least one of the criteria. Criteria i through vi are cultural, and vii through x are natural.

* Transnational site
† In danger

World Heritage Sites
Site	Image	Location	Year listed	UNESCO data	Description
Kyiv: Saint-Sophia Cathedral and Related Monastic Buildings, Kyiv-Pechersk Lavra†	Church with green and golden domes	Kyiv	1990	527ter; i, ii, iii, iv (cultural)	The Saint-Sophia Cathedral was constructed in the 11th century, soon after the Christianization of Kievan Rus'. Mosaics and frescos from that period have been preserved in the interior. Monastic buildings around the cathedral were constructed in the 17th and 18th centuries in Ukrainian Baroque style. The Kyiv-Pechersk Lavra is a monastic ensemble which was developing from the 11th to the 19th centuries. It comprises churches, monasteries, and caves where saints were buried. It was an important centre of Eastern Orthodox Church. The Church of the Saviour at Berestove, adjacent to the Lavra, was added to the site in 2005. In 2023, the site was listed as endangered because of the 2022 Russian invasion.
L'viv – the Ensemble of the Historic Centre†	Old colourful town houses and a fountain with a statue in front	Lviv Oblast	1998	865bis; ii, v (cultural)	The city of Lviv was founded in the late Middle Ages and still preserves its medieval topography. The city has been shaped by the interactions of the different communities that have lived there through centuries, including various Christian groups, Muslims, and Jews. The architecture of the city represents a fusion of styles from Eastern Europe with the influences coming from Italy and Germany. Several buildings from the Renaissance and Baroque periods have been preserved. In 2023, the site was listed as endangered because of the 2022 Russian invasion.
Struve Geodetic Arc*	A marker on the top of a mound in the middle of a field	Khmelnytskyi Oblast, Odesa Oblast	2005	1187; ii, iii, vi (cultural)	The Struve Geodetic Arc is a series of triangulation points, stretching over a distance of 2,820 kilometres (1,750 mi) from Hammerfest in Norway to the Black Sea. The points were set up in a survey by the astronomer Friedrich Georg Wilhelm von Struve who first carried out an accurate measurement of a long segment of a meridian, which helped to establish the size and shape of Earth. Originally, there were 265 station points. The World Heritage Site includes 34 points in 10 countries (North to South: Norway, Sweden, Finland, Russia, Estonia, Latvia, Lithuania, Belarus, Moldova, Ukraine), four of which are in Ukraine (site marker in Felshtyn pictured).
Ancient and Primeval Beech Forests of the Carpathians and Other Regions of Europe*	A beech forest	Ivano-Frankivsk, Khmelnytskyi, Lviv, Zakarpattia oblasts	2007	1133ter; ix (natural)	This site comprises undisturbed examples of temperate forests that demonstrate the postglacial expansion process of European beech from a few isolated refuge areas in the Alps, Carpathians, Dinarides, Mediterranean, and Pyrenees. The site was originally listed in 2007 as the Primeval Beech Forests of the Carpathians, shared by Slovakia and Ukraine, extended in 2011 to include the Ancient Beech Forests of Germany, and further extended in 2017 and 2021 to include forests in a total of 18 countries. In Ukraine, 13 forest reserves are listed (Uholka-Shyrokyi Luh pictured).
Residence of Bukovinian and Dalmatian Metropolitans	A building in red brick	Chernivtsi Oblast	2011	1330; ii, iii, iv (cultural)	The Residence of Bukovinian and Dalmatian Metropolitans was built for the Eastern Orthodox metropolitan bishop in the late 19th century, when the region was under the rule of Austria-Hungary. It was designed by the Czech architect Josef Hlávka. The ensemble is built in the historicist style and combines features of Byzantine, Gothic, and Baroque architecture. The complex served as the bishop's residence until World War II. In 1955, the property was transferred to Chernivtsi University.
Ancient City of Tauric Chersonese and its Chora†	Columns and ruins	Sevastopol, AR Crimea	2013	1411; ii, v (cultural)	The city was founded by Dorian Greeks in the 5th century BCE on the coast of the Black Sea. In the following centuries, the city saw the interactions of Greek, Roman, and Byzantine communities in the Black Sea region. It was ultimately abandoned in the 15th century. The area around the city was important due to its wine production, and the remains of ancient vineyards have been well preserved. In 2026, the site was listed as endangered because of damage caused by activities of the Russian authorities.
Wooden Tserkvas of the Carpathian Region in Poland and Ukraine*	Wooden church with three domes	Ivano-Frankivsk, Lviv, Zakarpattia oblasts	2013	1424; iii, iv (cultural)	This property comprises 16 wooden churches (tserkvas) in the Carpathians, eight of which are in Ukraine. The churches were built between the 16th and 19th centuries by the communities of Eastern Orthodox and Greek Catholic faiths. The designs are based on the Orthodox ecclesiastical traditions with local influences. They feature wooden bell towers, iconostasis screens, and interior polychrome decorations, as well as churchyards, gatehouses, and graveyards. The Holy Trinity Church in Zhovkva is pictured.
The Historic Centre of Odesa†	Opera building in Odesa	Odesa Oblast	2023	1703; ii, iv (cultural)	The city of Odesa rapidly developed as a port city in the late 18th and 19th centuries. A multicultural city, it was home to Bulgarians, Greeks, Armenians, Jews, Italians, Moldovans, Poles, Russians, Romanians, Tatars, and Ukrainians, whose traditions blended into a single socio-cultural environment within a century. Odesa preserves a number of 19th-century buildings and architectural ensembles, including Prymorskyi Boulevard, the Potemkin Stairs, and the Odesa Opera and Ballet Theater (pictured). The site was immediately listed as endangered because of the 2022 Russian invasion.

== Tentative list ==
In addition to the sites on the World Heritage list, member states can maintain a list of tentative sites that they may consider for nomination. Nominations for the World Heritage list are only accepted if the site has previously been listed on the tentative list. As of 2023, Ukraine has 16 sites on its tentative list.

Tentative sites
Site	Image	Location	Year listed	UNESCO criteria	Description
Historic Centre of Tchernigov, 9th—13th centuries	A white church in orthodox style	Chernihiv Oblast	1989	i, ii, iv (cultural)	This nomination comprises the historic centre of Tchernigov, or Chernihiv, that dates to the 9th—13th centuries. The nomination mentions the Transfiguration Cathedral from the 11th century and the Borysohlibskyi Cathedral from the 12th century (pictured).
Cultural Landscape of Canyon in Kamenets-Podilsk	Look at a castle with many towers from afar	Khmelnytskyi Oblast	1989	i, ii, iv (cultural)	This nomination comprises the castle (pictured) and the historic centre of the city Kamianets-Podilskyi, dating from the 11th to the 18th centuries.
Tarass Shevtchenko Tomb and State Historical and Natural Museum - Reserve	Old house, surrounded by trees	Cherkasy Oblast	1989	(mixed)	No description provided in the nomination documentation
National Steppe Biosphere Reserve "Askaniya Nowa"	A herd of Przewalski's horses running in a steppe	Kherson Oblast	1989	x (natural)	No description provided in the nomination documentation
Dendrological Park "Sofijivka"	A bridge over a stream in a park	Cherkasy Oblast	2000	(mixed)	The construction of the English landscape park was started in 1796 by Stanisław Szczęsny Potocki. It is a representative example of the landscape gardening architecture at the turn of the 18th century and is home to over two thousand plant species. Since 1955, it has been managed by the National Academy of Sciences of Ukraine.
Bagçesaray Palace of the Crimean Khans	A view of the palace, with chimneys and minarets	AR Crimea	2003	i, iii, v, vi (cultural)	The palace was constructed in the first half of the 16th century in the local period style. It served as the residence of Crimean Khans for around 250 years. The complex comprises two mosques, official buildings, living quarters of the Khans and their families, as well as auxiliary buildings, inner courtyards and parks.
Archaeological Site "Stone Tomb"	A stone mound	Zaporizhzhia Oblast	2006	iii, vi (cultural)	This archaeological site encompasses a large mound, up to 12 metres (39 ft) tall, made up of individual sandstone blocks. There are several petroglyphs on the stones, some dating to the Neolithic period while most were created in the Bronze Age. Remains of settlements from the Mesolithic and Neolithic periods have been found in the area.
Mykolayiv Astronomical Observatory	Observatory main building	Mykolaiv Oblast	2007	ii, iv (cultural)	The observatory in Mykolaiv was founded in 1821 as a naval observatory. The complex comprises the Classicist main building, astronomic pavilions from the early 20th century, and three modern pavilions that are in use for research.
Complex of the Sudak Fortress Monuments of the 6th – 16th c.	Fortress walls on a rocky mount	AR Crimea	2007	ii, iv, v (cultural)	The fortifications at Sudak, or Sugdeia, were constructed by the Byzantines in the Early Middle Ages and then by the Genoese who built most of the extant structures in the 14th and 15th centuries. Sudak declined in importance in the 17th century and the fortress became a museum in 1958.
Astronomical Observatories of Ukraine*	A white observatory	Mykolaiv Oblast, Kyiv, Odesa Oblast, AR Crimea	2008	ii, iv, vi (cultural)	This transnational nomination brings together important astronomical observatories. Four observatories from the 19th and 20th centuries in Ukraine are included in the nomination: Mykolaiv Observatory, Astronomical Observatory of Kyiv National University, Astronomical Observatory of Odesa National University, and Crimean Astrophysical Observatory (pictured).
Kyiv: Saint Sophia Cathedral with Related Monastic Buildings, St. Cyril's and St. Andrew's Churches, Kyiv-Pechersk Lavra (extension of Kyiv: Saint-Sophia Cathedral and Related Monastic Buildings, Kyiv-Pechersk Lavra)	St. Andrew's church, a Baroque building on the top of a hil	Kyiv	2009	i, ii, iii, iv (cultural)	This nomination considers the addition of two churches to the existing World Heritage Site in Kyiv. St. Cyril's Monastery is an important example of Kievan Rus' architecture. It was founded in the 12th century. The interior of the church has been largely preserved while the exterior has been renovated in Ukrainian Baroque style in the 17th and 18th centuries. St. Andrew's Church (pictured) was built in the mid-18th century following the designs of Francesco Bartolomeo Rastrelli. It is a rare example of Elizabethan Baroque in Ukraine.
Trading Posts and Fortifications on Genoese Trade Routes. From the Mediterranean to the Black Sea*	Sudak fortress on the top of a hill	AR Crimea	2010	ii, iv (cultural)	This transnational nomination brings together some of the most significant sites of maritime and mercantile settlements distributed around the Mediterranean and the Black Sea that were part of the trade network of Republic of Genoa between the 11th and 15th centuries. In Ukraine, the fortress in Sudak is nominated.
Cultural Landscape of "Cave Towns" of the Crimean Gothia	Ruins of Mangup	AR Crimea	2012	iii, v, vi, vii (mixed)	This nomination comprises two medieval settlements of Crimean Goths, Mangup (pictured) and Eski-Kermen, as well as the surroundings with limestone formations and man-made caves. The Goths settled the area in the 3rd to 4th centuries and allied with the Byzantine Empire in the 6th century. Mangup was their capital. The Principality of Theodoro formed in the area in the 14th century and was ultimately destroyed by the Ottomans in 1475.
The historical surroundings of Crimean Khans' capital in Bakhchysarai	Caves in the ruins of the old city of Chufut-Kale	AR Crimea	2012	ii, iii, v, vi (cultural)	This nomination comprises the Khan's palace and fortress of Chufut-Kale (ruins pictured), their surroundings, as well as historic buildings of Salachik and Eski-Yurt neighborhoods. The palace was constructed in the first half of the 16th century and served as the residence of Crimean Khans for around next 250 years. The area around Chufut-Kale was home to Alans from the 6th to the 15th century. It served as the first capital of Crimean Tatars in the 14th century. Between the 17th and 19th centuries, Crimean Karaites became the largest ethnic group in the city. Most of the archaeological remains are from this period.
Derzhprom (the State Industry Building)	A constructivist building complex from above	Kharkiv Oblast	2017	iv (cultural)	Derzhprom, or the State Industry Building, is located at the side of the Freedom Square in Kharkiv. Built in the 1920s, it is the world's largest building in constructivist style. It was designed by architects S.S. Serafnnov, M.D. Feldher, and S.M. Kravets. Derzhprom made modernism the main architectural style of the Soviet Union for several years.
Tyras - Bilhorod (Akkerman), on the way from the Black Sea to the Baltic Sea	Fortress at the waterfront	Odesa Oblast	2019	ii, iv, vi (cultural)	This nomination comprises the Bilhorod-Dnistrovskyi fortress and the ruins of Tyras. The Greek colony of Tyras was established in the 6th century BCE on the banks of the Dniester Estuary. Through centuries, it served as an important trade port, with routes connecting to the Silk Road, the Baltic, and the Mediterranean. The fortress of the city is the largest in Ukraine and preserves sections from the Genoese, Moldavian, and Ottoman periods. The city, now known as Bilhorod-Dnistrovskyi, was shaped by numerous communities that lived there through centuries.
Cucuteni-Trypillia Civilization*	A geomagnetic plan of a settlement overlaid on a sattelite map	Cherkasy, Khmelnytskyi, Kirovohrad, Kyiv, Ternopil, Vinnytsia oblasts	2026	i, ii, iii, iv, v (cultural)	This nomination shared with Moldova and Romania comprises numerous sites of the Cucuteni–Trypillia culture. This Chalcolithic civilization built interconnected planned settlements, over 5,000 of which have been discovered; those covering areas greater than 100 ha are classified as mega settlements and are unique to this culture. They practiced advanced agriculture, pottery, metallurgy, and arts. From Ukraine, eleven sites are nominated (ground plan of Maidanetske pictured).

== See also ==
- Intangible cultural heritage of Ukraine
- List of historic reserves in Ukraine
- National parks of Ukraine
- Tourism in Ukraine
