= Sofiyivka Park =

Arboretum in Cherkasy Oblast, Ukraine

Sofiyivka
- IUCN category IV (habitat/species management area)
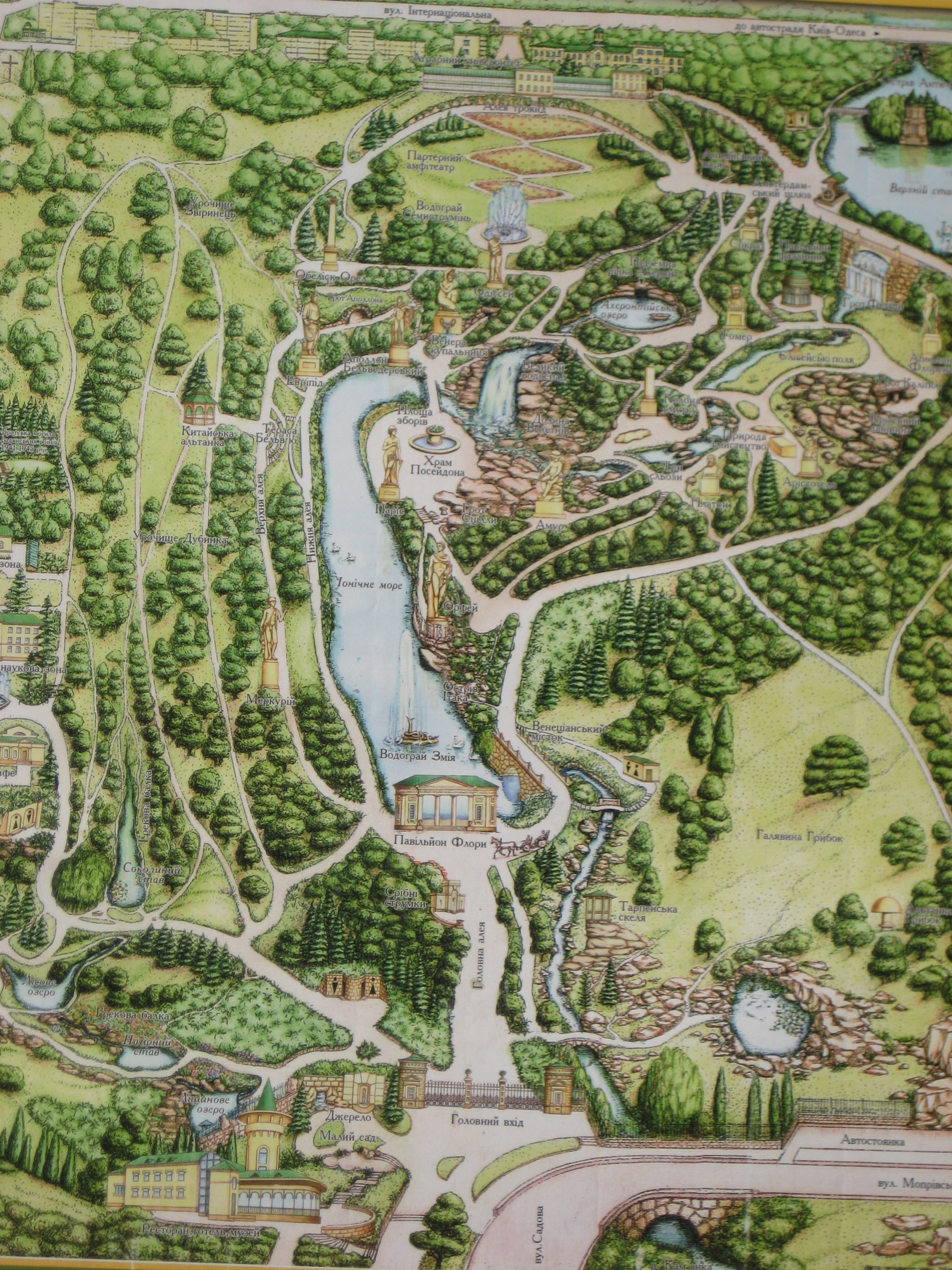
- Plan of the park

- Location within Ukraine
- Location: Uman, Cherkasy Oblast, Ukraine
- Coordinates: 48°45′51″N 30°14′37″E
- Area: 1.79 km^{2} (0.69 sq mi)
- Established: 1991
- Visitors: 300,000
- Governing body: National Academy of Sciences of Ukraine
- Website: www.sofiyivka.org.ua

Sofiyivsky Park (Ukrainian: Софіївський парк) or Sofiyivka Park (Ukrainian: Парк «Софіївка»; Polish: Park Zofiówka) is an arboretum (type of botanical garden) and a scientific-research institute of the National Academy of Sciences of Ukraine (NASU Department of Biology). The park is located in the northern part of the City of Uman, Cherkasy Oblast (Central Ukraine), near the Kamianka River. Some areas of the park are reminiscent of an English garden. Today, the park is a popular recreational spot, annually visited by 300,000 visitors. Since 2000, it is listed on the Tentative List of World Heritage Sites in Ukraine.

Sofiyivka is a scenic landmark of world gardening design at the beginning of the 19th century. The park accounts for over 2,000 types of trees and brush (local and exotic) among which are taxodium (marsh cypress), Weymouth Pine, tulip tree, platanus, ginkgo, and many others.

Since 1980, the director of the park is the member-correspondent of the Academy of Sciences, doctor of biological sciences Ivan Kosenko. In 1985, small planet #2259 was named "Sofiyivka" after this park.

== History ==
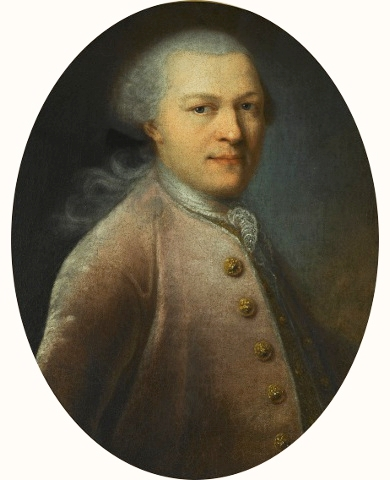
Stanisław Szczęsny Potocki

The English landscape garden was founded in 1796 by Count Stanisław Szczęsny Potocki, a Polish noble who rebuilt Uman after a peasant uprising. The city of Uman at that time was part of the Russian Empire. The park is named after his Greek wife Sofia. It was a gift of Stanislaw Potocki to his wife on her birthday.

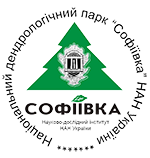
Logo of Sofiyvka

The cost of the original park was estimated at 15 million złoty, a fortune by contemporary standards. The main contractor was Ludwik Metzel, a Polish military engineer who imported many rare plants from all around Europe. He employed the local serfs as his main labor force. The land for the park was highly undeveloped with numerous ravines and divided by the Kamianka river. The main composition of the park is located by the very same river with series of artificial basins and ponds (Upper-8 ha, Lower-1.5 ha, and others), waterfalls (the highest one is 14m tall), locks, subterranean river Acheron (length-224m), fountains, etc. The opening ceremony was also honoured by Stanisław Trembecki, who wrote a poem praising the park and its namesake. The park is decorated with a number of sculptures, mostly antique ones, and artificial cliffs, grottoes, and gazebos. The park was confiscated from private possession after the Polish November Uprising in 1832 and transferred to the Kyiv Official Chamber. The same year Nikolai I presented the park to his wife Alexandra Feodorovna. In 1836–59, the park was a property of the Military Settlements Administration and was majorly changed.

It is one of the world-famous garden-park art creations. There are many scenic areas in the park including waterfalls, fountains, ponds, and a stone garden. It is one of the most famous examples of late 18th or early 19th century European landscape garden design that has been preserved to the present time.

The Sofiyivsky Park was named one of the Seven Wonders of Ukraine on 21 August 2007, based on voting by experts and the Internet community.

== Park sights ==
By original idea of the architect, the park illustrates different parts of Homer's poems Odyssey and Iliad.

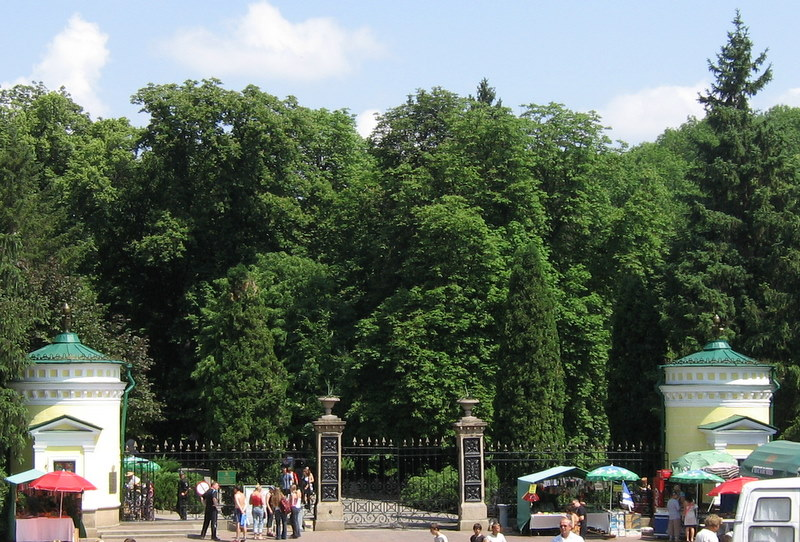
Main Entrance

=== Southern Part ===
The park starts with "Main entrance" on Sadova Street. The central alley starts after the main entrance. Main entrance towers, which were built in 1850–1852, are still standing there. A tourist service center, which is now called "The House of Science Art", is located nearby. This building has original architecture with observation area on the top. Besides a museum, the building has a hotel, restaurant, and sauna. Long time the entrance of the park was decorated with Black Poplars (trees with triangle shape). From "Sofiyivka" park, these trees became very popular all around Russian Empire. Before 1996, on the right side from entrance, small historical museum was located. It was built in 1957 and was used as a laboratory. After 1980 it was modified to museum to train guides. In 1996 all exhibits were moved to administrative building. Now from the place of former museum you can see granitic cliffs and small "Geneva lake" which appeared here in the 1930s.

On the glade up the Geneva lake, a small gazebo was built for the guard soldier. The shape of the gazebo looked like a mushroom, that's why the area on the hill on the right side from the entrance is called 'Mushroom'. The gazebo was renovated in 1994.

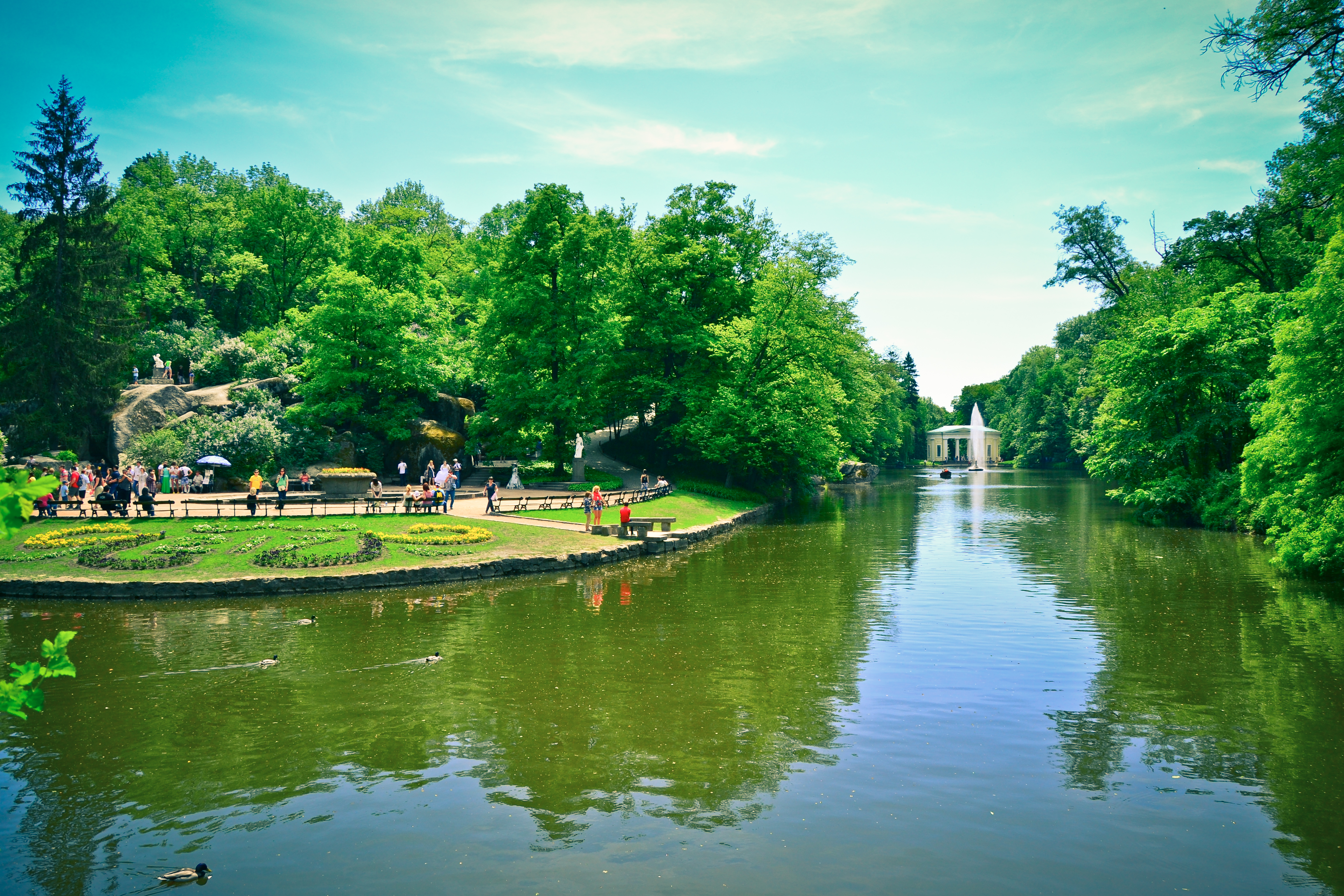
View of the Assembly Square and the Ionian Sea (in the distance is the Snake Fountain and the Flora Pavilion)

On the right side of main alley (between Main Entrance and Taypersk Rock), cypresses and pine trees are growing. These trees were planted in 1891. This area was called "Small Switzerland" before the beginning of World War II.

'Taypersk Rock' is located on the right side of main alley after Small Switzerland. This rock is named after the South-Eastern wall of Capitol fortress of Ancient Rome, and it has a wooden gazebo on it. During the rule of Potockiy, this point was the end of the park.

Before the Flore Pavilion, on the left, you can see a spring - "Silver Sources". This natural source of water is decorated in antique style and was constructed in 1974.

The main alley ends with "Flora Pavilion". It is located on the square where several roads are taking beginning in different directions.

=== Central Part ===
Compositional decision of the central zone of Sofiyivka in Ukraine based on scenes from the mythology of Ancient Greece and Rome, and some places are imitation of habitations of the Greek gods, heroes, writers and philosophers. On the contrary, Thunder grotto (the grotto of Calypso) is a water pipeline to supply. That area is decorated by statues of Hermes and Venus.

To the east of the statue of Cupid on the left side are the granite steps that lead to the grottoes Loketek and Nut. They are created on the first period of construction of the Sofiyivsky park in Ukraine.

Nut Grotto is located on the right side. He completes the composition of the Valley giants. In the grotto carved granite Not lava, and next to it is made three-stage waterfall.

== Gallery ==
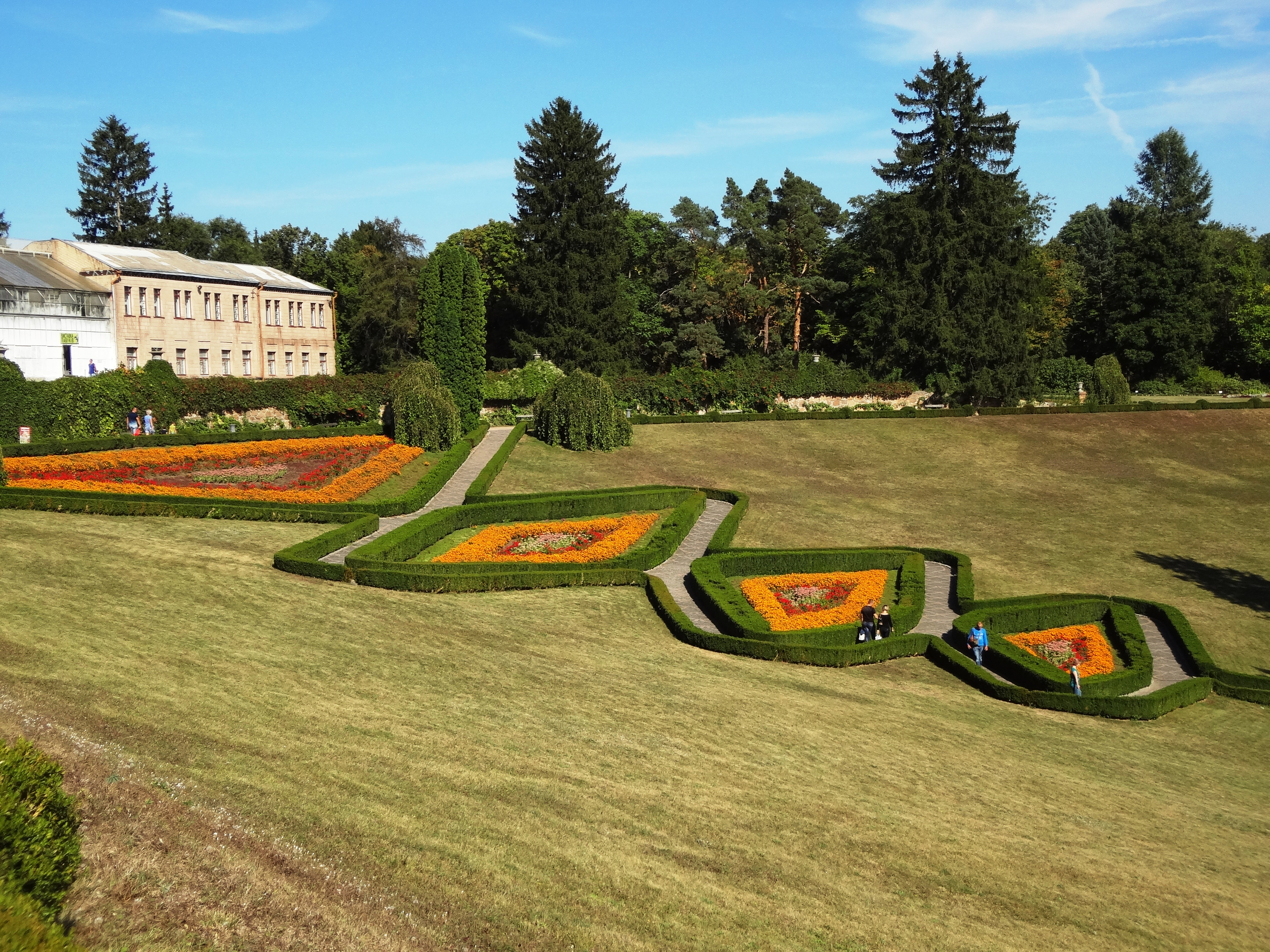

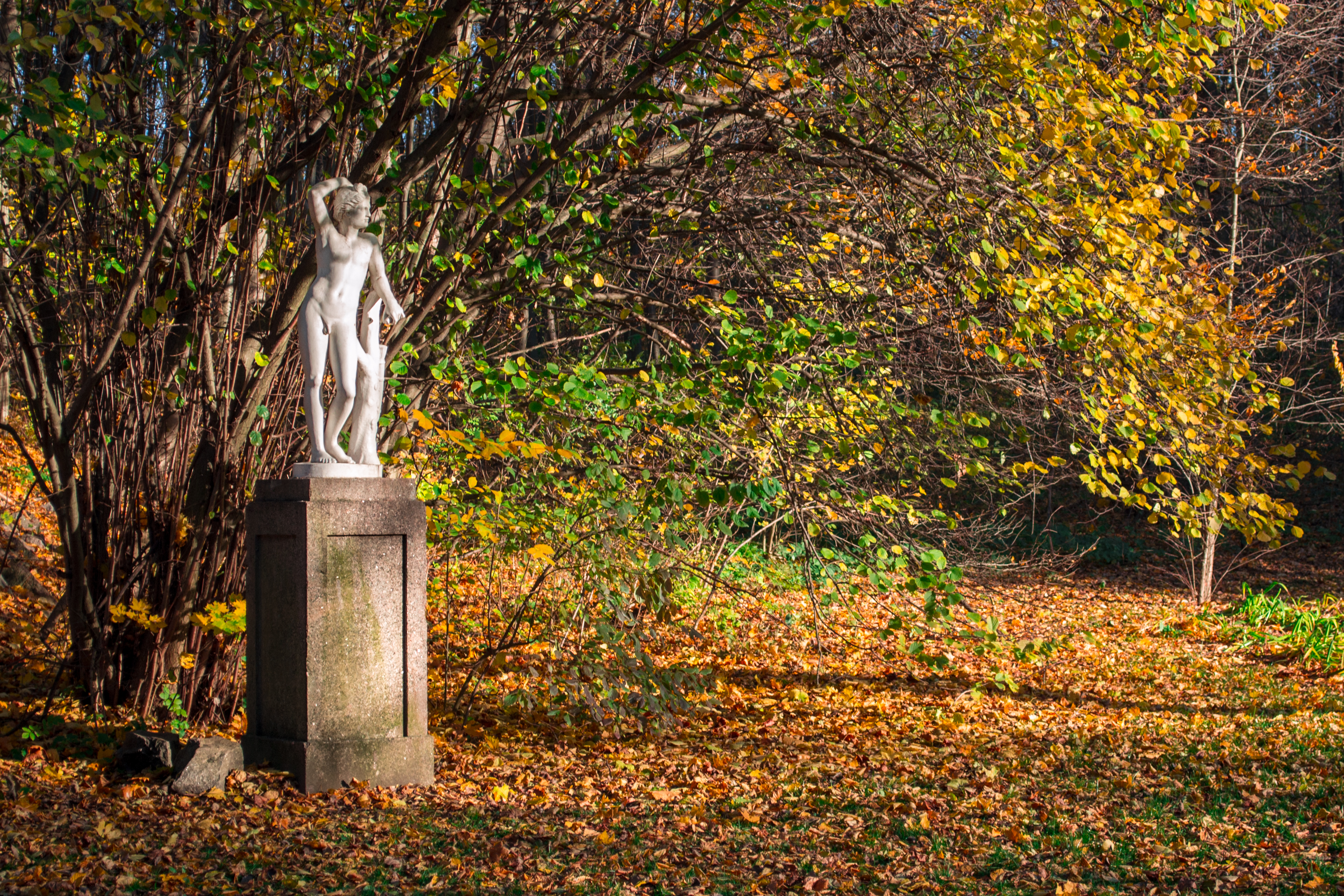

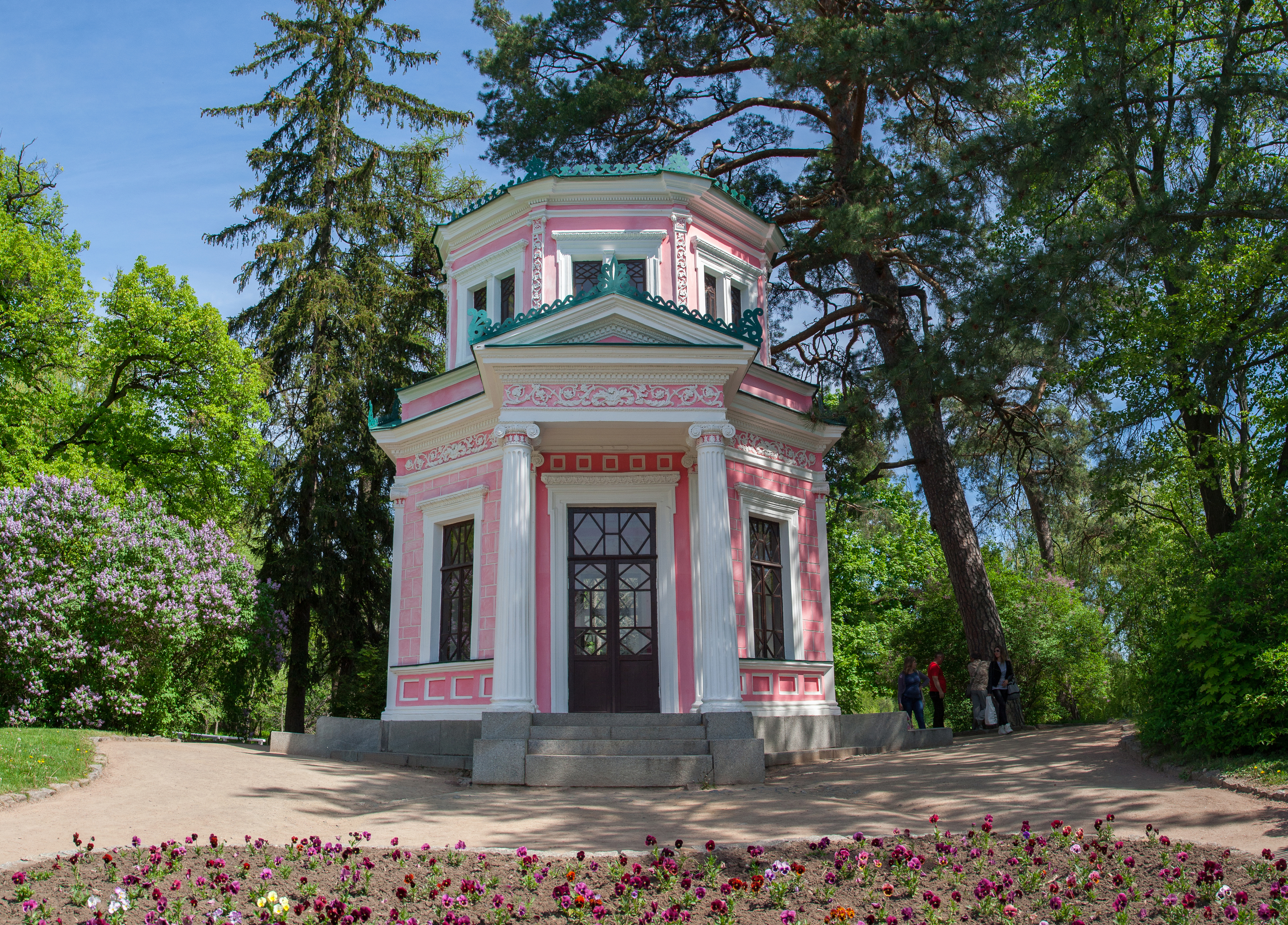

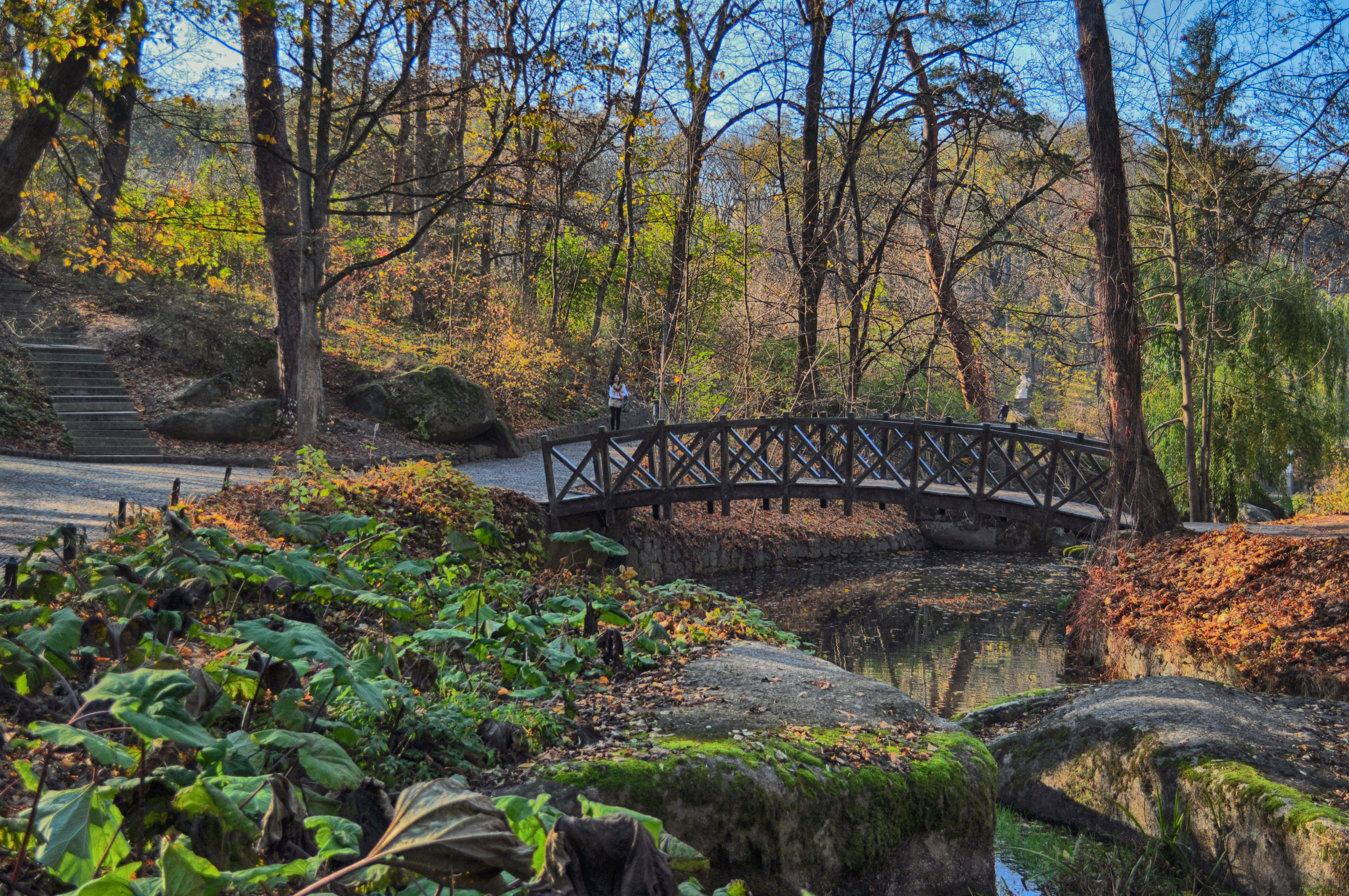

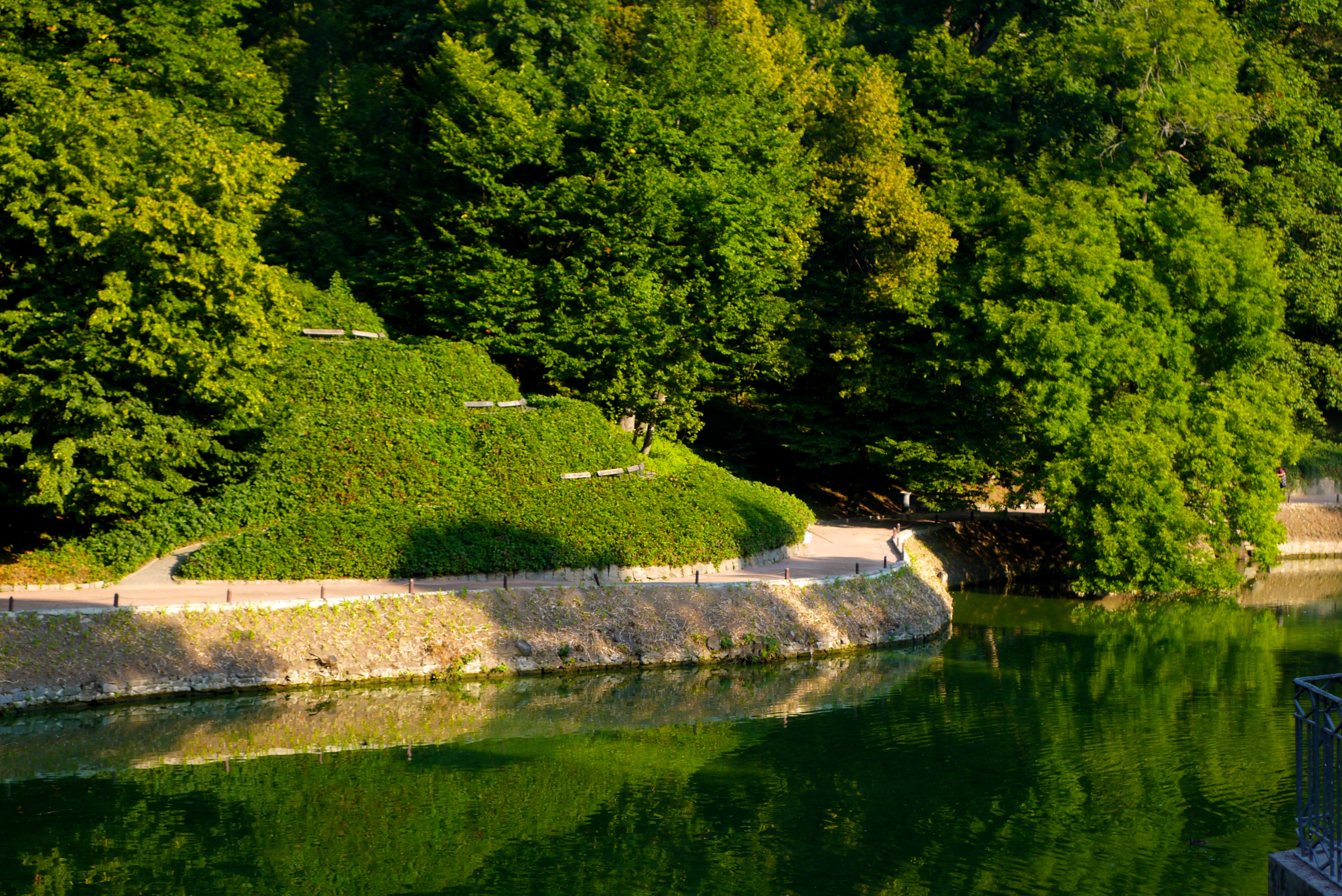

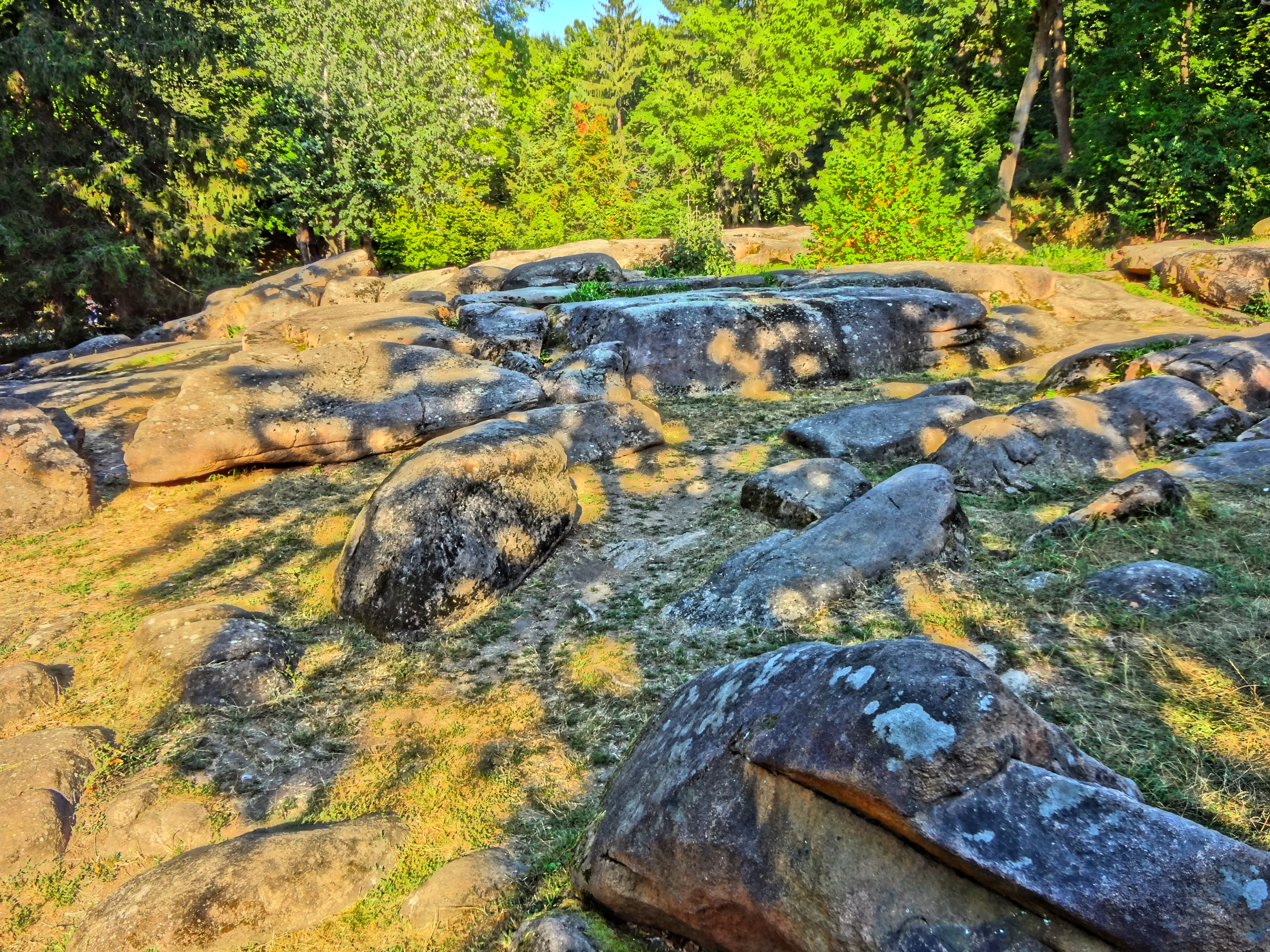

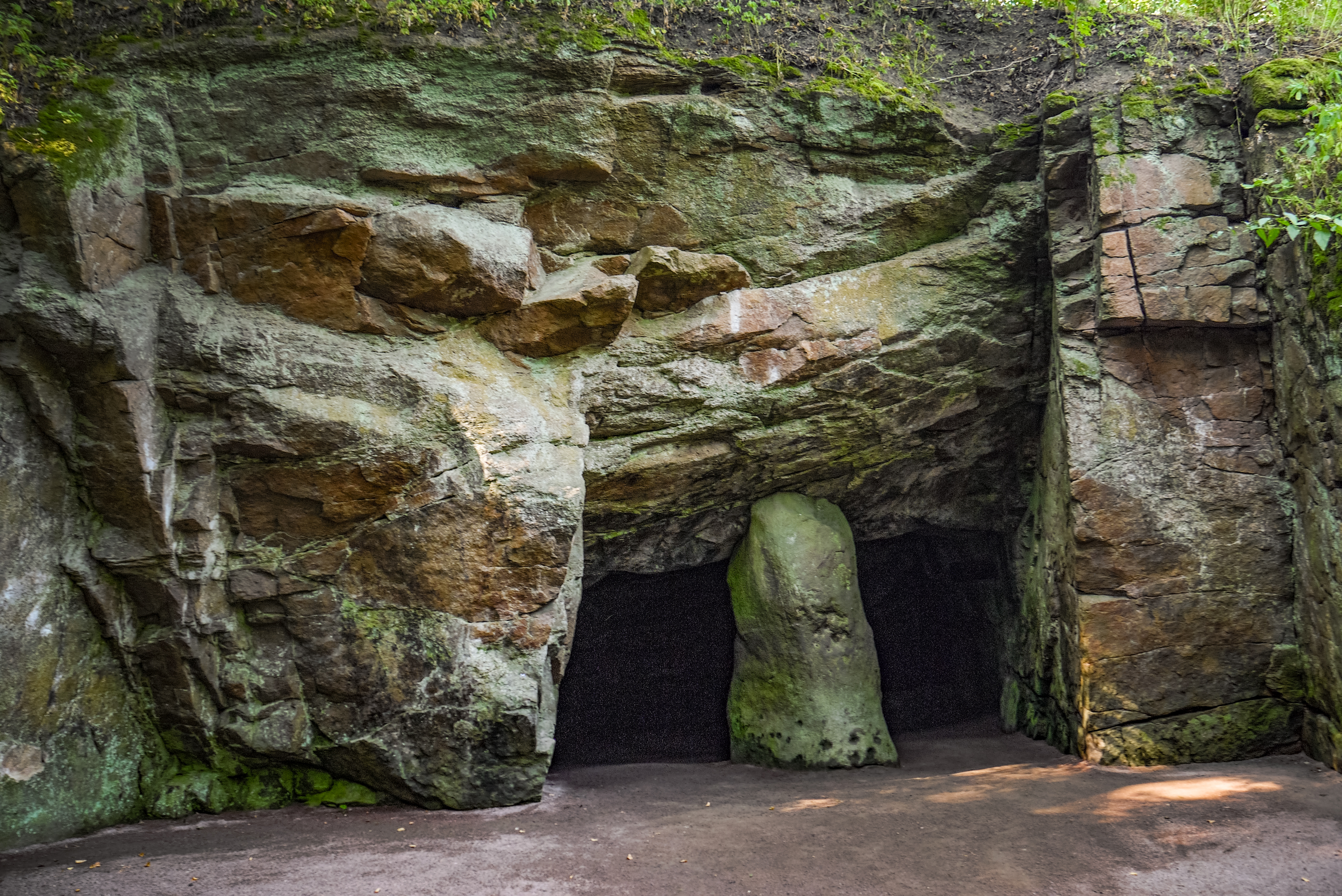

== See also ==
- Anna Kuzemko
