= Arkadyevna =

Arkadyevna is a Russian feminine patronymic name, which means "daughter of Arkady". The equivalent masculine version of the name is Arkadyevitch. Notable people with the name include:

== Academics ==
- Anna Kuzemko (born Anna Arkadyevna Kuzemko), Ukrainian ecologist
- Irina Kraeva (born Irina Arkadyevna Kraeva; 1958), Russian linguist

== Actresses ==
- Nina Shatskaya (born Nina Arkadyevna Shatskaya; 1966), Russian singer and actress
- Vera Michurina-Samoilova (born Vera Arkadyevna Michurina-Samoilova; 1866–1948), Russian stage actress

== Politics and royalty ==
- Maria Arkadyevna Stolypina (1819–1889), Russian courtier
- Tatjana Ždanoka (born Tatjana Arkadyevna Ždanoka; 1950), Latvian politician
- Varvara Nelidova (born Varvara Arkadyevna Nelidova 1814–1887), Russian imperial mistress

== Sports ==
- Aleksandra Pasynkova (born Aleksandra Arkadyevna Pasynkova; 1987), Russian volleyball player
- Anna Smolina (born Anna Arkadyevna Smolina; 1994), Russian tennis player
- Susana Kochesok (born Susana Arkadyevna Kochesok; 1995), Russian trampolinist
- Yelena Naimushina (born Yelena Arkadyevna Naimushina; 1964–2017), Russian gymnast

== Writers ==
- Alisa Ganieva (born Alisa Arkadyevna Ganieva; 1985), Russian author
- Darya Dontsova (born Darya Arkadyevna Dontsova; 1952), Russian author
- Veronika Dolina (born Veronika Arkadyevna Dolina; 1956), Russian poet
