= Kuzemko =

Kuzemko (Ukrainian: Куземко) is a Ukrainian surname. Notable people with the surname include:

- Anna Kuzemko (fl. 1997–), Ukrainian botanist and ecologist
- Irene Kuzemko (born 1993), Ukrainian-Russian intersex woman
