= Olga Potocka =

Polish countess (1802–1861)

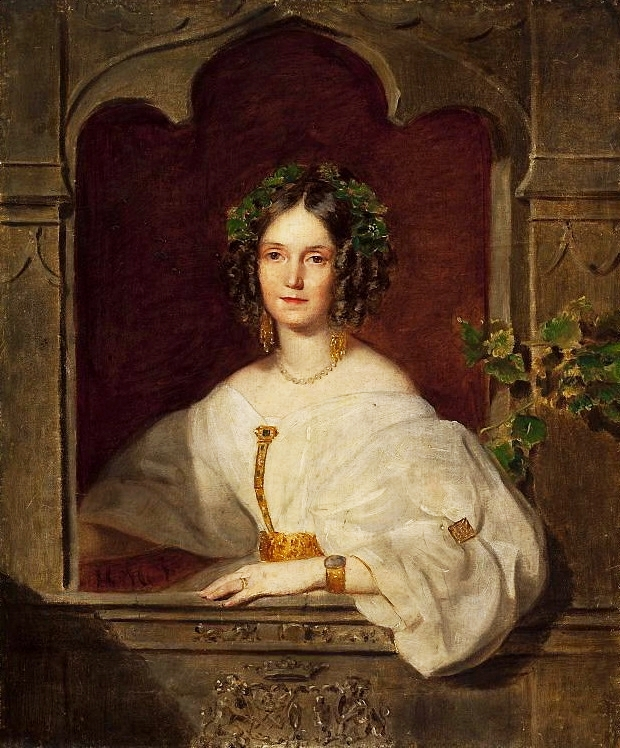
- Born: 1802; Tulchin, Podolsk Governorate, Russian Empire
- Died: 7 October 1861 (aged 58–59); Paris, France
- Noble family: Potocki
- Father: Stanisław Szczęsny Potocki
- Mother: Sofia Clavone

Olga Potocka, later Naryshkin (1802, Tulchin - 7 October 1861, Paris, France) was the daughter of the Polish magnate Stanisław Szczęsny Potocki and Sofia Clavone and wife of Lev Naryshkin.

== Biography ==
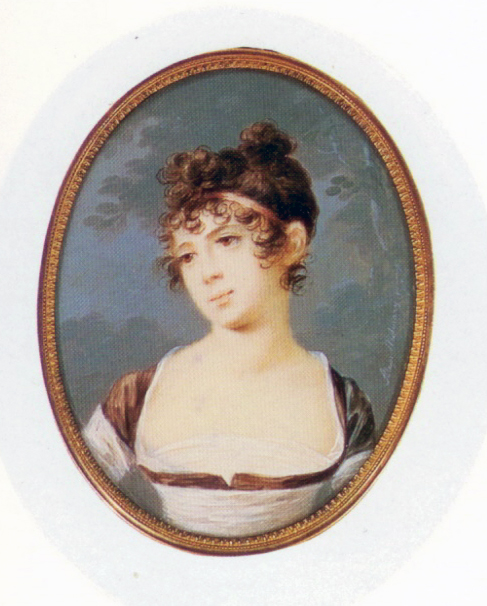
Olga Naryshkina by A.Molinari (1814-6, Hermitage)

Olga was born in 1802 in Tulchin, a year after her sister Sofia . The girls grew up in Tulchin, where there were two palaces belonging to their family, and in Uman, where the famous Sofievka garden was laid out in honor of their mother. The family spent part of the year in Crimea, where Potemkin gave his mistress, their mother, the large village of Massandra. The estate stretched from the Yayla ridge to the sea, covering an area of over 800 acres. In the mountainous part, this huge estate contained timber forests; in the valley, vineyards of the finest French vines were soon planted, and a luxurious park with rare tropical plants was laid out.

After the death of her husband in 1805, Countess Sofia Konstantinovna Potocka fought a difficult inheritance battle with her stepsons for many years. One of the main lawyers in the case was Count Miloradovich, who fell in love with young Olga.

Potocka, knowing that she was seriously ill, was concerned about the fate of unmarried Olga. The marriage of the eldest daughter Sofia with General Kiselyov was a decided matter, and in 1821 their wedding took place.

Olga, with her mother’s permission, often visited Miloradovich, sat alone with him for an hour in his office and accepted magnificent gifts from him. Count Olizar recalled that Miloradovich’s reception office was decorated with pictures, engravings and figurines depicting Olga, who secretly made fun of the passion of the 50-year-old general.

Then a new candidate for her hand appeared the 33 year old Prince Pavel Lopukhin, whose mother and sister persuaded Olga to agree to this marriage. Countess Potocka wrote to her daughter Sophia:

"As for Olga, she follows your advice and behaves better with Lopukhin, who would visit us more often if not for Miloradovich. I hope that somehow everything will work out. He is too timid, almost the same as she... He looks in love, she is also not indifferent. I believe that she will be happy with him. I confess to you that I really want this marriage; Things are not going well with my health, I have to go to bed early; I would like to be calm for my daughter, but this is still difficult."

At the insistence of doctors, Countess Potocka, together with Olga, left St. Petersburg in 1821, for Berlin, where she died on 12 November 1822. After the death of her mother, Olga inherited Miskhor, and her sister Sophia inherited Massandra. Her mother had intrusted Olga to the care of her older sister and her husband Kiselyov.

Olga, according to memoirist Basargin, had a more positive character than her older sister and “was famous for her beauty” which, combined with her practicality, played a sad role in the life of her older sister Sofia. In the eyes of General Kiselyov, Olga soon eclipsed the charm of his young wife, and their romance turned into a strong lifelong relationship that shattered Sofia Stanislavovna’s happiness. By 1829, the Kiselyovs’ marriage had broken up.

=== Marriage ===
In addition to her sister, the wife of Mikhail Semyonovich Vorontsov, Elizaveta Ksaverevna took care of Olga after the death of her mother, and took an active part in her life. They urgently began to look for a groom for Olga, and decided on General Lev Naryshkin, who was a cousin of Vorontsov. They were married in March 1824 in Odesa, where they settled after the wedding. The bride was 22 years old, and the groom waws 38 years old.

Their marriage was not a happy one. Beautiful and flirtatious, she was not suited to the lazy, sleepy, but kind, Naryshkin. Kiselyov and Vorontsov blamed Naryshkin and his aunt, Maria Naryshkina, with whom he spent much of his time.The couple were known for their hospitality and receptions.

Filipp Vigel, a frequent guest at the high society dinners and balls of Olga Naryshkina and Countess Vorontsova wrote:

"Back in the summer in Odessa I saw the so famous Olga Potocka. Her beauty was in all its splendor, but there was nothing virginal or touching about her; I was surprised, but did not admire her. She was rather silent, not proud, but also inattentive to those for whom she had no need, not so much thoughtful as absent-minded, and in her very first youth she seemed already armed with great experience. Everything was calculated, and she saved the arrows of coquetry for defeating the strong... As for Olga’s husband, Lev Naryshkin, he led the strangest life, that is, he was bored with her, did not go anywhere, and spent two-thirds of the day sleeping. She also showed herself little, but in order to keep up with the habit of dominating the authorities, while waiting for Vorontsov, she decided to capture Palen, and unfortunately, she succeeded in doing so. Palen fell at the feet of Olga Naryshkina, begging her to divorce her husband and marry him; she burst out laughing and pointed him to the door."

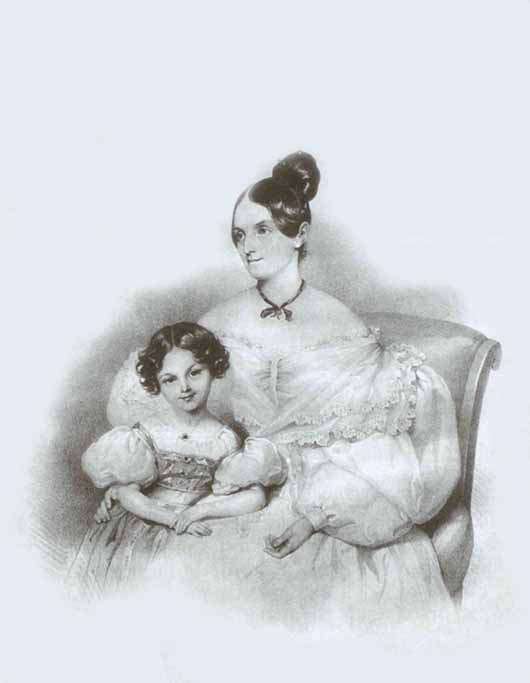
Olga and her daughter, Sofia. c. 1830's.

According to L. Lurie’s description, Olga Naryshkina “was a real Messalina,” for in Odessa “there was not a nobleman who was not in connection with her”. Olga Naryshkina also had a close relationship with M. S. Vorontsov. Pushkin wrote about their relationship in his diary dated 8 April 1834:

"Bolkhovskoy told me that Vorontsov’s hair was washed according to a letter from Kotlyarevsky (the hero). He speaks very angrily about life in Odessa, about Count Vorontsov, about his seductive relationship with O. Naryshkina, etc. etc. — He praises Countess Vorontsova very much."

It was roumoured that Vorontsov arranged the marriage of Olga Potocka with his cousin to cover up his own affair with her. Vorontsov took upon himself many of the costs of maintaining Miskhor, where the Naryshkins lived in the summer, and paid off the gambling debts of Olga’s husband. In 1829, the Naryshkins had a long-awaited child, a girl who was named Sofia. Though it was speculated that she was the daughter of Mikhail Vorontsov.

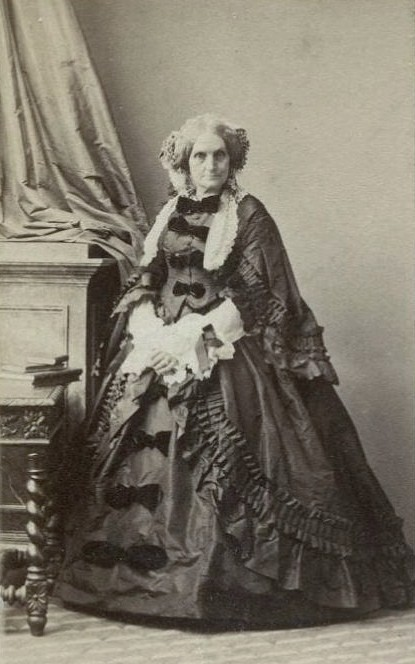
Olga Naryshkina, 1860.

=== Life in Odessa ===
The importance of the couple in Odessa was great, but whether it was explained by Maria Naryshkina, who was the mistress of Alexander I, or Olga's relationship with Vorontsov is difficult to say.

Alexandra Smirnova, a close friend of Kiselyov's brither Nikolai, recalled in her memoirs:

"We spent the summer of 1838 pleasantly... Countess Kiseleva and her sister Naryshkina, the Ribopierres, always dined at the kurgauz. I talked about these sisters. Sophia told me that they are all honest, and Olga will give you poison and will run for the antidote herself. Sofia Stanislavovna fell in love with me terribly; After water, I came to her for coffee."

=== Later years ===
In 1838, Olga and her daughter accompanied her husband for his treatment abroad, where they spent several years. They lived for a long time in Vienna, Berlin, Munich, and Rome.

In February 1846, her only and much loved daughter, Sofia, married Pyotr Pavlovich Shuvalov (1819-1900). Having parted with her daughter, Olga Stanislavovna focused on her sick husband. Lev Naryshkin's health deteriorated each day. He moved on crutches and there was no hope of recovery. In November 1846, he died in Naples. After burying her husband in the Annunciation tomb of the Alexander Nevsky Lavra, Olga settled with her daughter's family in Crimea.

In the late 1850's Olga left for Paris. Here, her last meetings with Kiselyov took place. She died in Paris, 7 October 1861, and was buried in the Père Lachaise cemetery. According to Zablotsky-Desyatovsky, Kiselyov was saddened by her death. Towards the end of her life, he visited her everyday, and was with her an hour before her death. Her last words, "Farewell, it's all over." were addressed to him.
