= Zofia Potocka =

Polish noblewoman (1760–1822)

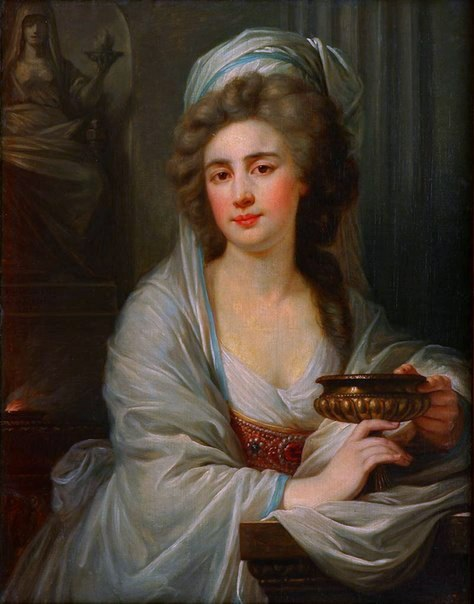
- Born: 11 January 1760; Bursa, Anatolia, Ottoman Empire
- Died: 24 November 1822 (aged 62); Berlin, Prussia
- Spouses: Józef de Witte; Stanisław Szczęsny Potocki
- Issue: Ivan Osipovich de Witt; Konstanty Potocki; Mikołaj Potocki; Helena Potocka; Aleksander Potocki; Mieczysław Potocki; Zofia Potocka; Olga Potocka; Bolesław Potocki
- Father: Constantine Clavone
- Mother: Maria Clavone

Zofia Potocka (née Clavone; 11 January [O.S. 1 January] 1760 – 24 November 1822) was a Greek slave courtesan and a Russian agent, later a Polish noblewoman. She was famous in contemporary Europe for her beauty and adventurous life. During the Russo-Turkish War she was the lover of the Russian commander Prince Grigory Potemkin and acted as an agent in Russian service.

Compatriots of her time wrote: "She was beautiful as a dream, a child of southern countries. All those who have seen her admire her beauty, igniting a fire in the hearts of men and envy in the eyes of women."

== Life ==
=== Early life ===
Clavone was born on 11 January [O.S. 1 January] 1760 in the Turkish city of Bursa to a Greek family of a disputed surname; Zofia was given various family names throughout her life: Glavani, Clavone or Celice. Her father Constantine was a poor Greek cattle merchant, her mother was named Maria. In 1772, when Zofia was 12 years old, she moved to the Greek district of Phanar in Constantinople with her parents and sisters.

Around 1775, when Zofia was 15 years old, her father Constantine died under mysterious circumstances. Her mother married an Armenian, who also died. During the great fire in Constantinople, their house burned down. In this difficult time for them, her mother Maria sought support from foreign embassies.

In May 1777, when Zofia was not yet 17 years old, Maria sold her two daughters to the Polish Ambassador, Karol Boscamp-Lasopolski. The ambassador was known to procure girls for the Polish king. Learning about their supposed noble origin and seeing the beauty of the girls, the Ambassador agreed to help. The sisters were claimed to descend from the noble aristocratic family of Pantalis Mavrocordatos, who was related by blood to the rulers of Byzantium.

Zofia and her sister settled in his palace and were given lessons in French. Reportedly, the ambassador kept her as his mistress for a time, and then prostituted her. Boscamp-Lasopolski arranged for her sister to be sold as a wife to a Turkish Pasha, but he promised her mother to arrange marriage for Zofia in Europe.

The Polish Count Major Józef de Witte learned the purpose of the trip and her supposed lineage. He made an offer, bought her from Boscamp-Lasopolski and married her in 1779. Józef's father was the commandant of the fortress Kamieniec Podolski, where the couple lived for a year before departing for Europe in 1781.

=== Europe ===
Zofia was reportedly a sensational success when being introduced to the aristocracy by her spouse in the drawing room receptions of Europe in the palaces of Berlin and Hamburg, Vienna, Rome, Venice and, most famously, in Paris. She was celebrated as "The most beautiful woman in Europe" and known for her expression: "My eyes aches". Her beauty as well as her ability to improvise herself out of difficult situations resulted in widespread admiration. She further gathered notoriety by engaging in affairs with powerful personalities. She was regarded as fashionable at every party in high society in the cities they visited, and was courted by monarchs and ministers.

At the beginning of their European tour, the couple visited Warsaw. In early March 1781, she was called to court to be introduced to King Stanisław II Augustus. After Warsaw, they visited Berlin, where Zofia was introduced to the King of Prussia Frederick II. In the resort town of Spa, Zofia was introduced to the Austrian Emperor Joseph II, who was reportedly so fascinated and impressed by her that he ordered Mozart to compose music on the Turkish harem theme. In one of his letters to his sister, the French queen Marie Antoinette, Joseph II recommended the Witte couple to her.

Zofia saw Marie Antoinette at Petit Trianon, which at that time was being rebuilt in a landscaped park. This was possibly what inspired Zofia later in life to create a similar park. Reportedly, Marie Antoinette was charmed by her and spoke of Zofia as her adopted daughter. While staying in Paris, Zofia became the lover of both of the French king's brothers; the Count of Provence, later King Louis XVIII, and the Comte d'Artois, the future French king Charles X respectively.

In Paris, on 17 November 1781, Zofia gave birth to a son. After this news reached the Polish king, she traveled to meet him at Kamianets where he congratulated her father-in-law, still commandant of the fortress, on the birth of a grandson. The king also promoted the man to the rank of Lieutenant General, and volunteered to be the godfather of the newborn.

=== Russia ===
In 1782, the couple returned to Kamianets-Podilskyi, visiting Vienna, Moravia, Northern Hungary and Galicia on the way. In 1785, her husband succeeded his father as commandant of Kamianets, making Zofia first lady of Podolia.

During the Russo-Turkish War, she entered a relationship with Prince Potemkin, the Russian military leader and favorite of Catherine the Great. They remained close until his death. At least during the Siege of Khotyn, Zofia's husband managed Potemkin's net of agents in Southern Poland as well as his spy contacts within Chotin. In practice, Zofia at least assisted him in managing these contacts, as her elder sister was married to the Turkish pasha of Chotin. Potemkin appointed Józef de Witte governor of Cherson, and gave Zofia the informal task of managing the Turkish-Polish relations. In 1791, she accompanied Potemkin to Saint Petersburg, where she was introduced to the nobility as his official mistress.

=== Later life ===
In February 1796, Zofia arrived in Uman and announced her divorce from Józef De Witte. On 17 April 1798, in Tulchyn, she married Stanisław Szczęsny Potocki, who had divorced his wife in order to marry her. The wedding ceremony was conducted with the participation of the Orthodox priest and Catholic priest in an Orthodox Church.

During her second marriage, Zofia had three sons; Alexander (born in 1798), Mieczyslaw (born in 1800) and Boleslaw (born in 1805), and two daughters; Sophia, and Olga (1802-1861). During the marriage, she also had an affair with her stepson, Szczęsny Jerzy Potocki, who may have been the biological father of her son Boleslaw. She also had an affair with the Russian governor, Nikolai Novosiltsov. Stanisław Szczęsny Potocki indulged in mysticism and came under the influence of Polish "Illuminati" and died on 15 March 1805, without having time to say goodbye to her. As a widow, she was only entitled by law to her dowry in addition to a small portion of her late spouse's fortune. This would have impoverished her, as she had brought no dowry to the marriage. However, she managed to inherit almost all of her late husband's fortune with the assistance of her stepson and the Russian governor, both of whom were her lovers.

During this latter part of her life, Zofia reportedly occupied herself with the upbringing of her children and with charitable activities. Looking back on her time in Russia, she described the late Potemkin as a brother.

=== Death ===
In the early 1820s, her health deteriorated. The mysticism of the Polish Illuminati was said to have affected her health. She left for Berlin to consult German doctors, where she died on 24 November 1822, aged 62.

She had left instructions to be buried in Uman. Zofia's embalmed body was clothed in a beautiful dress and placed in a carriage, one hand holding a bouquet and a fan in the other. Her body was transported in such a way across the border. In Uman, an elaborate funeral ceremony was conducted out of respect for the charitable works of her later years. As Zofia's coffin was carried 10 miles along the road, barrels of resin were placed along the way for lighting torches as the procession passed that the night before a huge crowd.

Zofia was buried in the crypt under the Basilian church. In 1877, her body was disturbed when the church was badly damaged by an earthquake. Her remains were reburied in Talne along with those of her youngest daughter Olga, where they still rest in the crypt of the church.

== Gallery ==
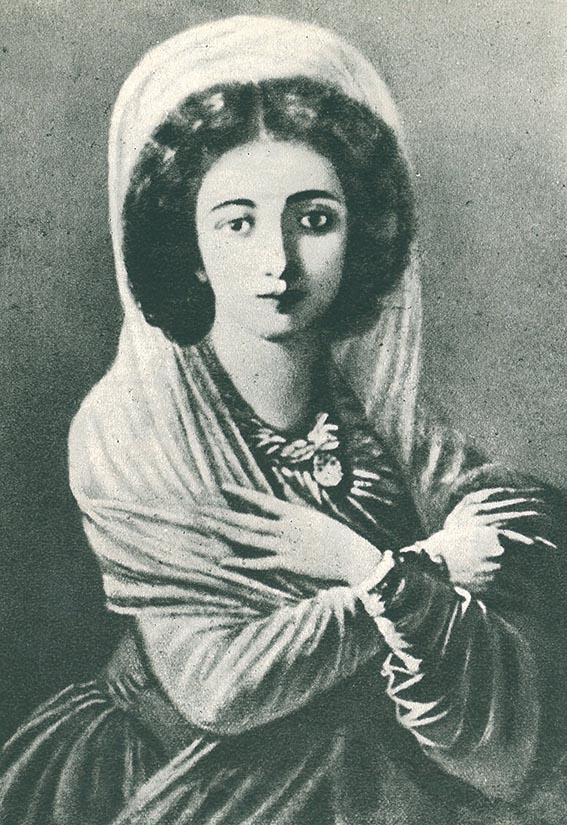
1780

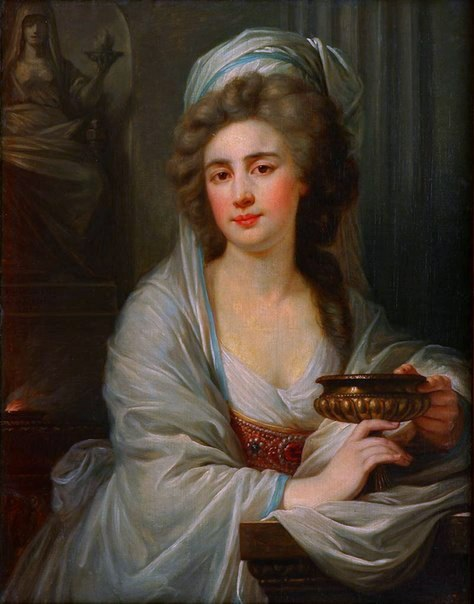
about 1785

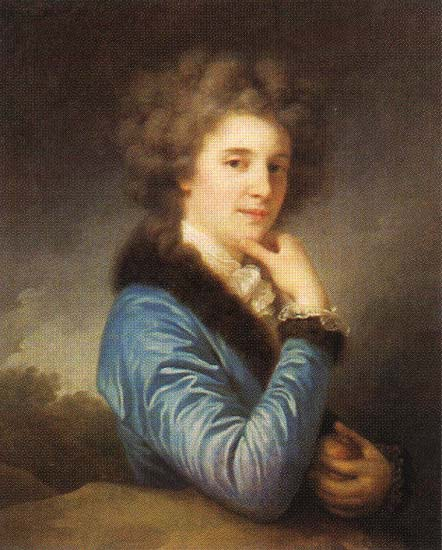
1790/1800

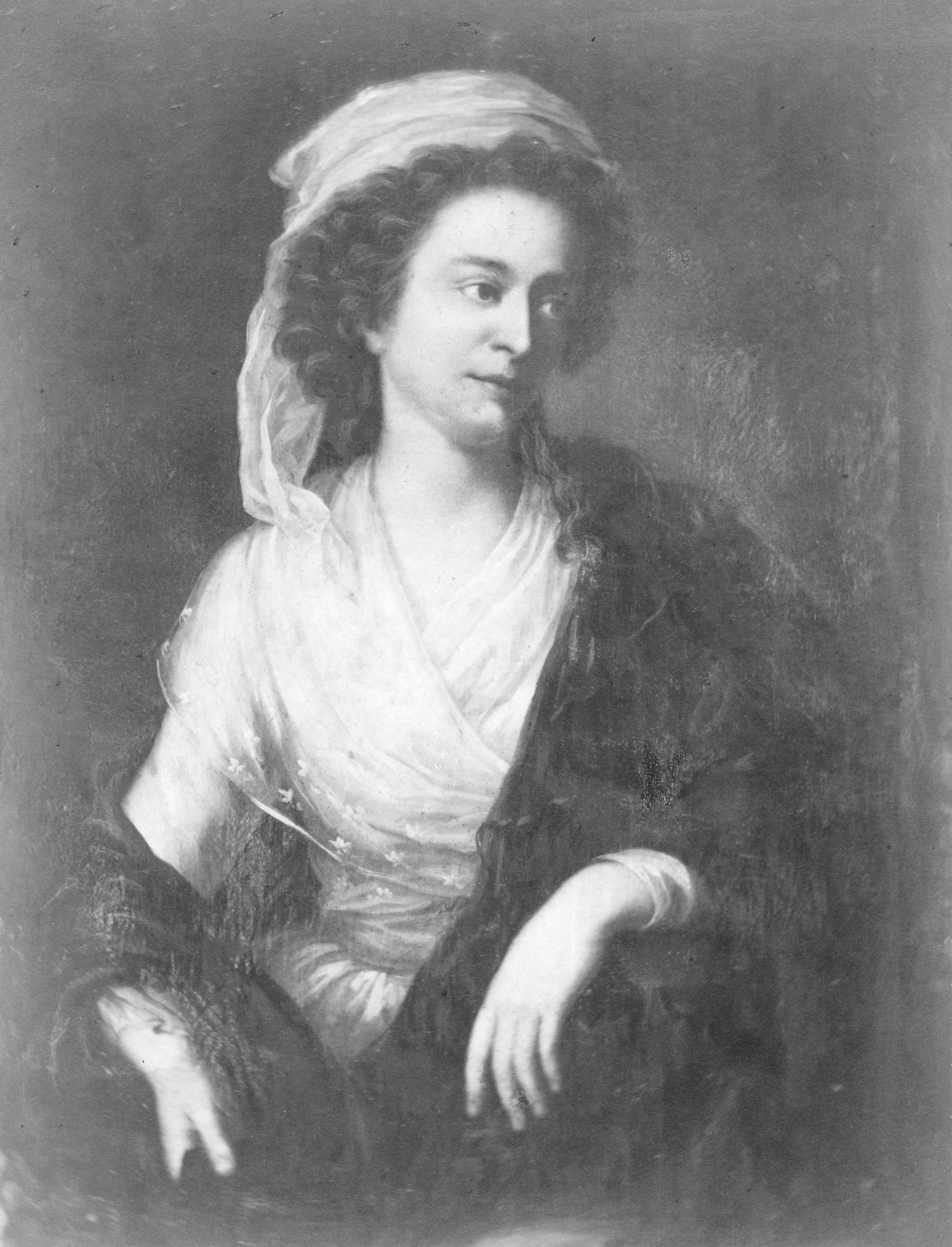
about 1805
