= Stanisław Szczęsny Potocki =

Polish general (1751–1805)

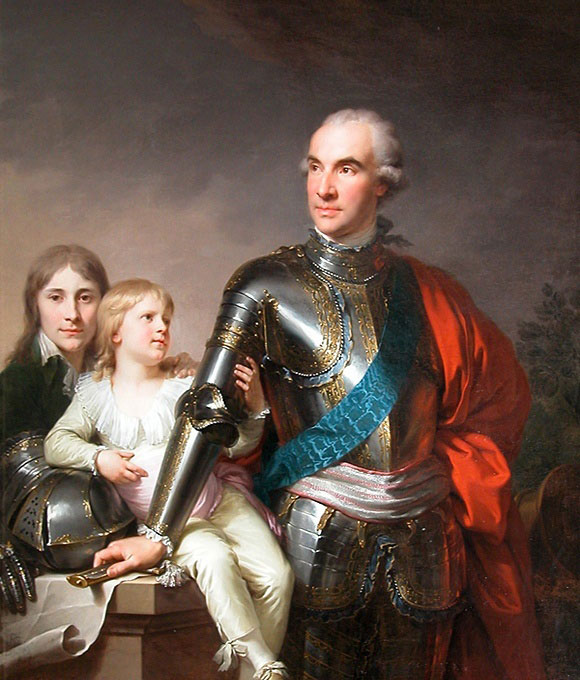
- Portrait by Johann Baptist von Lampi the Elder, 1790
- Coat of arms: Piława
- Born: 1751; Krystynopol
- Died: 14 March 1805 (aged 53–54); Tulczyn
- Noble family: Potocki
- consort: Gertruda Komorowska; Józefina Amalia Mniszech; Zofia Clavone
- Issue: with Józefina Amalia Mniszech; Pelagia Róża Potocka; Szczęsny Jerzy Potocki; Witoria Potocka; Ludwika Potocka; Róża Potocka; Konstancja Potocka; Stanisław Potocki; Oktawia Potocka; Jarosław Potocki; Włodzimierz Potocki; Idalia Potocka with Zofia Clavone; Konstanty Potocki; Mikołaj Potocki; Helena Potocka; Aleksander Potocki; Mieczysław Potocki; Zofia Potocka; Olga Potocka; Bolesław Potocki
- Father: Franciszek Salezy Potocki
- Mother: Anna Elżbieta Potocka

Count Stanisław Szczęsny Feliks Potocki (Polish pronunciation: [staˈɲiswaf ˈʂt͡ʂɛ̃snɨ pɔˈtɔt͡ski]; 1751–1805), of the Piława coat of arms, known as Szczęsny Potocki was a member of the Polish szlachta and a military commander of the forces of the Polish–Lithuanian Commonwealth and then Poland. Knight of the Order of the White Eagle, awarded in August 1775.

He was named Great Chorąży of the Crown in 1774–1780, voivode of Ruthenian Voivodeship in 1782–1791, Great Lieutenant General of the Crown since 1784, General of Artillery of the Crown in 1789–1792, starost bełski, hrubieszowski, sokalski, hajsyński, zwinogrodzki, Marshal of the Targowica Confederation in 1792. He plotted with others against the state, was convicted of treason and sentenced to death in his absence. He died in ignominy.

== Biography ==
=== Early life ===
He was the son of Franciszek Salezy Potocki, Voivode and Governor of Polish Kyiv, of the Tulczyn line of the family. He entered the public service, and owing to the influence of his relations became grand standard-bearer of the Crown at the age of twenty-two. After the death of Prince August Aleksander Czartoryski in 1782, King Stanisław II Augustus appointed him the Voivode of Ruthenia. In 1784, he purchased the rank of a colonel from bankrupted Voivode of Kyiv, Stempkowski and soon became a lieutenant-general in the Royal Army.

=== A "Great" nobleman ===
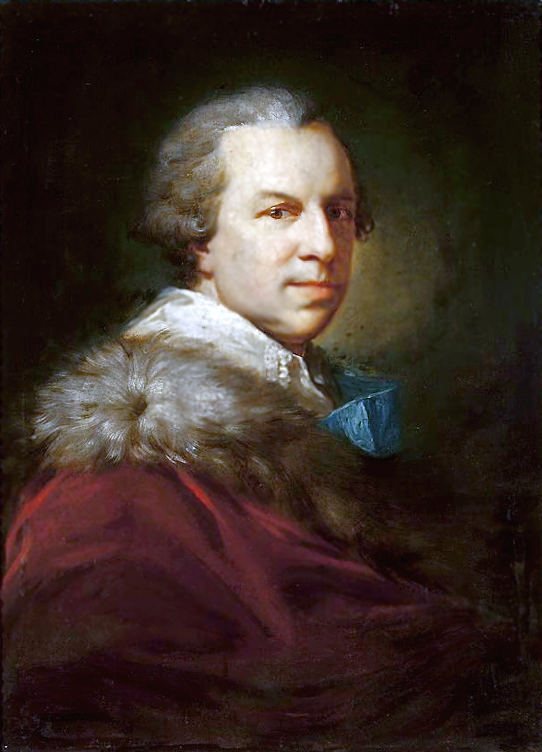
Portrait of Potocki by Johann Baptist von Lampi the Elder

He was a great magnate, grandly ruling in his vast estates in the eastern parts of the Polish–Lithuanian Commonwealth, known as the Kresy. His annual income was over 3 million zloties.

Elected deputy for Bracław at the famous Four-Year Sejm, he began that career of treachery which was to terminate in the ruin of his country. Yet his previous career had awakened many hopes in him. His popularity culminated in 1784 when he presented an infantry regiment of 400 men as a free gift to the Commonwealth. But he identified the public welfare with the welfare of individual magnates, his aims in seeking reforms was to transform the Crown of the Kingdom of Poland and the Grand Duchy of Lithuania into a magnate oligarchy.

=== Family ===
The father of numerous children, one of his daughters, Olga, married Lev Naryshkin.

=== Time of the Partitions ===
His scheme was to divide Poland into an oligarchy of autonomous grandees exercising supreme power in rotation (in fact a perpetual interregnum). In 1788 he persuaded two other magnates, Franciszek Ksawery Branicki and Severin Rzewuski to join the anti-royalist conspiracy. The election of Stanisław Małachowski and Kazimierz Lew Sapieha as marshals of the Four Years Sejm still further alienated him from the Liberals. After strenuously but vainly opposing every project of reform, he slipped off to Vienna whence he continued an active propaganda against the new proposals.

=== Protest against the Constitution ===
He opposed the Constitution of 3 May of 1791, and was one of the leaders of the Hetman Party. After attempting fruitlessly to persuade the Leopold II, Holy Roman Emperor to take up arms against the reformers, he proceeded with his co-conspirators to St. Petersburg in March 1792 and, with the connivance of the Empress Catherine II of Russia formed the Targowica Confederation allegedly for the maintenance of the ancient and lax institutions of Poland (14 May 1792), of which he had been marshal, or rather the dictator.

He continued directing the conspiracy from his castle at Tulczyn. When the May Constitution was overthrown and the Prussians were already in occupation of Greater Poland, Potocki (March 1793) went on a diplomatic mission to St. Petersburg. There finding himself duped and set aside, he again went to Vienna until 1797, when he retired to Tulczyn and devoted himself to the improvement of his estates and large wealth for the remainder of his life.

He had been sentenced to death in absentia by the Supreme Criminal Court during the Kościuszko Uprising in 1794. On 17 November 1797 he was made a general of the Russian infantry, but was dismissed on 30 October 1798. He was buried with the ignominy of a "traitor" general.

== Quote ==
After the signing of the Targowica Confederation: "Each true Pole, not blinded by the Prussian and royalist cabal, is convinced, that our Fatherland can only be saved by Russia, otherwise our nation will be enslaved".

After Stanisław August Poniatowski's abdication and the destruction of the Polish-Lithuanian Commonwealth: "About past Poland and Poles [I don't want to talk anymore]. Gone is this country, and this name, as many others have perished in the world's history. I am now a Russian forever."

== See also ==
- Arboretum Sofiyivka
