= Stanisław Trembecki =

Polish writer (1739–1812)

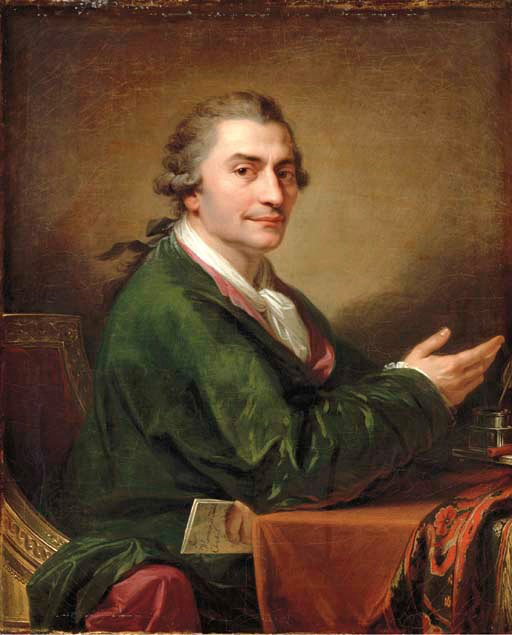
Portrait by Johann Baptist von Lampi the Elder

Stanisław Trembecki (8 May 1739 – 12 December 1812) was a Polish Enlightenment poet and translator, well known for his poems Na dzień siódmy września and Nadgrobek hajduka that are said to have started a new trend in Polish political lyric poetry. He was also the poet laureate in the court of Tulchyn, now in Ukraine.

Trembecki wrote odes, fables, and libertine poems in additional to his classical style poetry praising kings and other nobility. He also translated Horace and Tacitus. Trembecki was known as a drunk and a Don Juan and fought a number of duels throughout Europe.

In his writings, Polish poet Apollo Korzeniowski recalls an episode where an obscure Rococo poet, Wojciech (Adalbert) Mier, won Trembecki's translation of the fourth song of Torquato Tasso's Jerusalem Delivered in a game of cards, which Mier then published under his own name.
