= Irina Kraeva =

Russian linguist (born 1958)

- Born: 8 July 1958 (age 68)
- Education: Maurice Thorez Moscow State Pedagogical Institute of Foreign Languages (Ph.D in Philology)
- Scientific career
- Fields: Linguistics, language education, pedagogy
- Workplaces: Moscow State Linguistic University

Irina Arkadyevna Kraeva (Russian: Ирина Аркадьевна Краева; born 8 July 1958) is a Soviet and Russian linguist, Philology Ph.D, professor, Rector of Moscow State Linguistic University.

== Education ==
Kraeva graduated with honors from Maurice Thorez Moscow State Pedagogical Institute of Foreign Languages in 1980 (qualification assigned: "English and French Language Teacher"). By the end of her postgraduate studies in the Department of English Language in MSLU, she defended a PHD dissertation in the field of Germanic Languages. The topic of the dissertation was "Degree of quality in different types of nominations (based on English adjectives)".

== Teaching and administrative activity in University ==
In 1980, Kraeva began work at the Maurice Thorez Moscow State Pedagogical Institute of Foreign Languages. From 1980 to 1989, she was a professor, and later, senior professor, and from 1993 to 2006, an associate professor, leading the Department of English Language (the Translation Studies sector). From 2003 to 2006, she was an academic secretary of the Academic Council. From 2006 to 2017, she was an acting dean of the Department of the English Language, Professor in the Department of English Lexicology.

In 2018, she began working as the Head of MSLU.

== Academic work ==
Kraeva is an author of over 60 articles in lexicology and language education that were published in academic magazines, textbooks and teaching materials. According to h-index, Kraeva is awarded grade 7.

== Membership in academic organizations ==
- Certified Expert of Federal commission of Educational and Scientific Supervision ( from 2014);
- MSLU Representative in the Belin-Blank Center for Gifted Education, in Iowa Institute);
- MSLU Representative in the European Center for Modern Languages ( Graz, Austria);
- Member of The European Language Council
- Chairwoman of the commission in the organization of The Unified Foreign Languages State Exam in Moscow The Unified State Exam (2011—2014 гг.);

== Main works ==
=== Monographies ===
- Kraeva I. A. "The development of the category of "Degree" in the English Language" . Monography. — М.: Е Triumph, 2021. 166 p.

=== Scientific articles ===
- Kraeva I.A. "The role of MSLU as the main organization working for the improvement and development of academic potential of language and cultural community between CIS countries."// Materials for the conference devoted to the week of education as a part of "30 years of CIS partnership in the field of education, science and youth politics" PFUR, 2021. p. 121—130.
- Kraeva I.A. "The Specifics of expressing implication with relative adjectives in the English Language". // The Semantic potential of language units and its realization: the main points of the scientific conference reports. Minsk: MSLU, 2021. p. 32—34.

=== Textbooks and didactic materials ===
- Kraeva I.A., Belykh E.K., Guseva N.G., Morozova English Speaking Practice: didactic materials for Linguistics and Translation Studies students. Volume I. — М.: MSLU, 2018. 102 p.
- Kraeva I.A., Mokhrova G.M., Frolova O.F. . English in the field of Professional Communication: The culture of religious and international relations М.: MSLU, 2013. 150 p.

== Awards ==
- Medal "30 year Anniversary of Kazakhstan Independency" (2022);
- Honours Diploma RAE (2021);
- An Honourable Academic of "Manas" National Academy named after Chingiz Aytmatov (2021);
- Medal of «Unity» in honour of 60 years of formation of the Organization of United Nations (2019).

== Quotes ==
This is how I. Kraeva defines the main principles of administering the university:

«Any university is a complex mechanism. It is not only an honour to manage it, but also a challenge. My main goal is to preserve and multiply what we have. I want to preserve our traditions and the linguistic school, but at the same time hope to continue to improve in the context of modern education. The fact that I have gone through all of the steps starting from the bottom in our university will, of course, come in handy: My education and academic interests match with those promoted in our university; I know the students and staff very well».
