= Anna Kuzemko =

Ukrainian scientist

Anna Arkadyevna Kuzemko
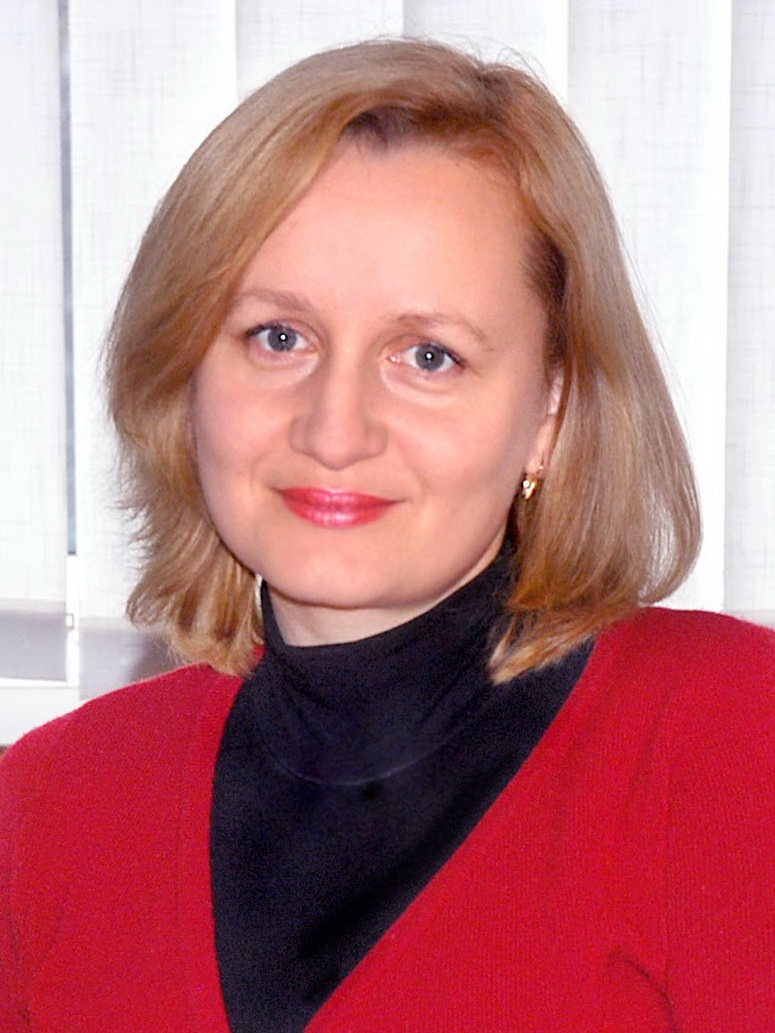
- Citizenship: Ukraine
- Education: M.G. Kholodny Institute of Botany at the National Academy of Sciences of Ukraine
- Alma mater: Pavel Tychyna Uman State Pedagogical University
- Scientific career
- Fields: Botany, Ecology, Geobotany, Nature conservation

Anna Arkadyevna Kuzemko (Ukrainian: Анна Аркадіївна Куземко) is a Ukrainian scientist in the fields of botany, ecology, and nature conservation, Doctor of Biological Sciences (2013), a leading researcher at the M.G. Kholodny Institute of botany, NAS of Ukraine. She is a member of the executive committee of the Eurasian Dry Grassland Group (EDGG), a member of the International Working Group "European Vegetation Survey" (Огляд рослинності Європи) and a member of the International Association for Vegetation Science (Міжнародної асоціації науки про рослинність).

In 2018, A. Kuzemko became one of the founders of the public organization "Ukrainian Nature Conservation Group" and was elected to its board.

== Biography ==
In 1997, she graduated from Pavel Tychyna Uman State Pedagogical Institute. From 1997 to 2000, she studied at the graduated from the M.G. Kholodny Institute of botany, NAS of Ukraine. In 2003, she defended her Candidate of Biological Sciences degree thesis, "Vegetation of the Ros River Valley: syntaxonomy, anthropogenic dynamics, protection" (advisor: D.V. Dubina). Since 2006, she has worked in the Sofiyivka National Dendrological Park. In 2012, she defended her doctoral dissertation on "Meadow vegetation of forest and forest-steppe zones of the plains of Ukraine: structure and anthropogenic transformation" (advisor: Y.R. Shelyag-Sosonko), and the following year received the appropriate degree. In 2017, she returned to work at the Institute of Botany of the National Academy of Sciences of Ukraine.

== Publications ==
- Куземко А. А. Рослинний покрив долини нижньої течії р. Рось та шляхи його збереження // Український ботанічний журнал. — 2000. — 57, No. 5. — С. 523–533.
- Куземко А. А. Охорона флори та рослинності долини річки Рось // Український ботанічний журнал. — 2002. — 59, No. 5. — С. 569–577.
- Куземко А. А. Зміна участі господарських груп в угрупованнях класу Molinio-Arrhenatheretea R.Tx. 1937 внаслідок антропогенної трансформації // Український ботанічний журнал. — 2008. — 65, No. 3. — С. 317–335.
- Kuzemko A. Dry grasslands on sandy soils in the forest and forest-steppe zones of the plains region of Ukraine: present state of syntaxonomy // Tuexenia. — 2009, No. 29. — P. 369—390
- Куземко А. А. Лучна рослинність. Клас Molinio-Arrhenatheretea — Київ: Фітосоціоцентр. 2009. — 376 с.
- Куземко А. А. Концепція асоціації в сучасній фітосоціології // Чорноморський ботанічний журнал. — 2011. — Т. 7, No. 3. — С. 215–229.
- Kuzemko A. A., Becker T., Didukh Y. P., Ardelean I. V., Becker U., Beldean M., Dolnik C., Jeschke M., Naqinezhad A., Uğurlu E., Ünal A., Vassilev K., Vorona E. I., Yavorska O.H. & Dengler J. Dry grassland vegetation of Central Podolia (Ukraine) — a preliminary overview of its syntaxonomy, ecology and biodiversity // Tuexenia. — 2014. — 34. — P. 391–430.
- Куземко А. А., Діденко І. П., Швець Т. А., Чіков І. В., Джус Л. Л., Чеканов М. М. Рідкісні та зникаючі види колекції трав'янистих рослин Національного дендрологічного парку «Софіївка» НАН України. — Київ, 2015. — 180 с.
- Kuzemko A., Steinbauer M. J., Becker T., Didukh Y. P., Dolnik C., Jeschke M., Naqinezhad A., Ug˘urlu E., Vassilev K., Dengler J. Patterns and drivers of phytodiversity in steppe grasslands of Central Podolia (Ukraine) // Biodiversity and Conservation. — 2016. — 25(12). — P. 2233–2250.
- Kuzemko A. A. Classification of the class Molinio-Arrhenatheretea in the forest and forest-steppe zones of Ukraine // Phytocoenologia. — 2016. — 46(3). — P. 241–256.
