= Tulchyn =

City in Vinnytsia Oblast, Ukraine

Tulchyn Тульчин
- City
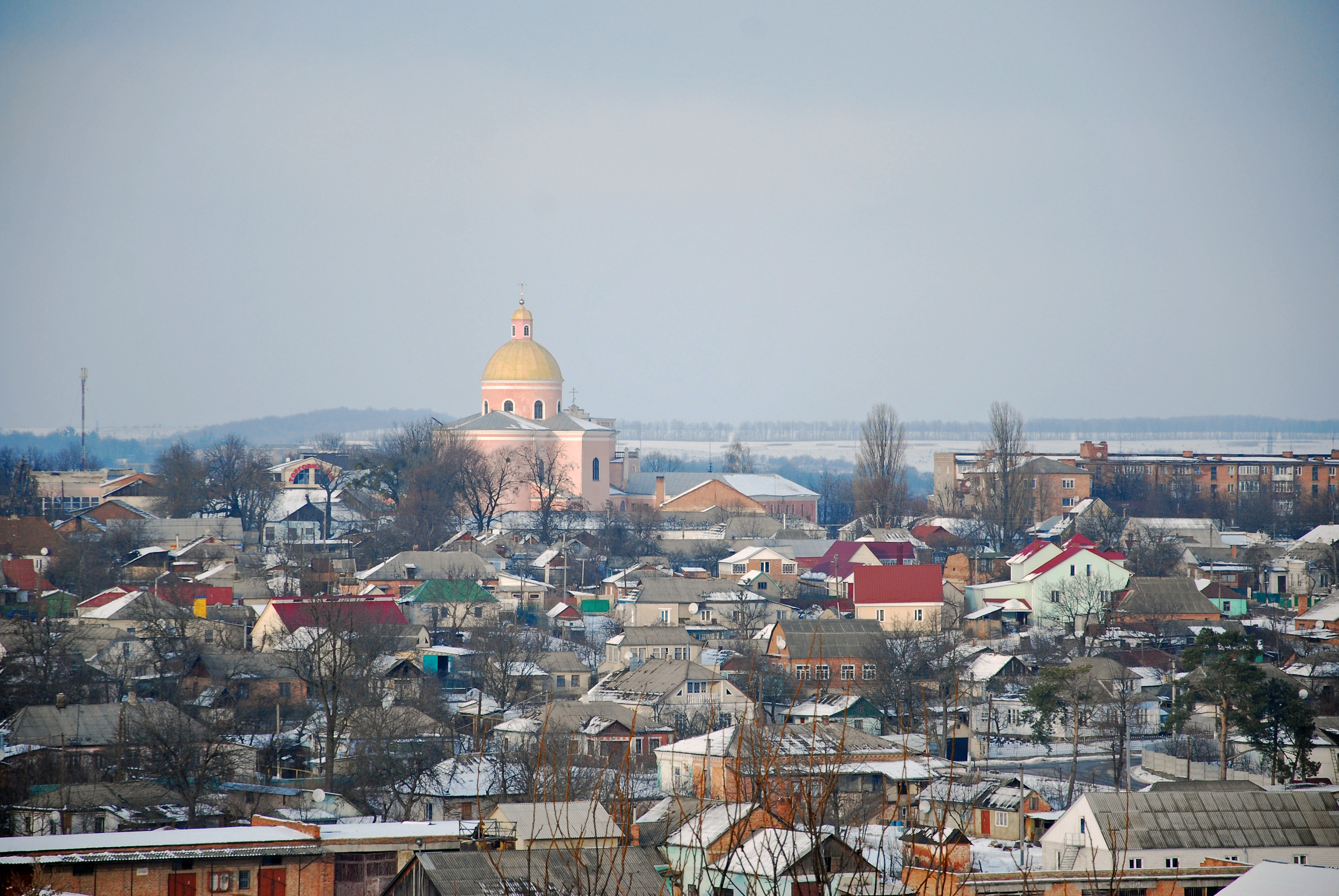
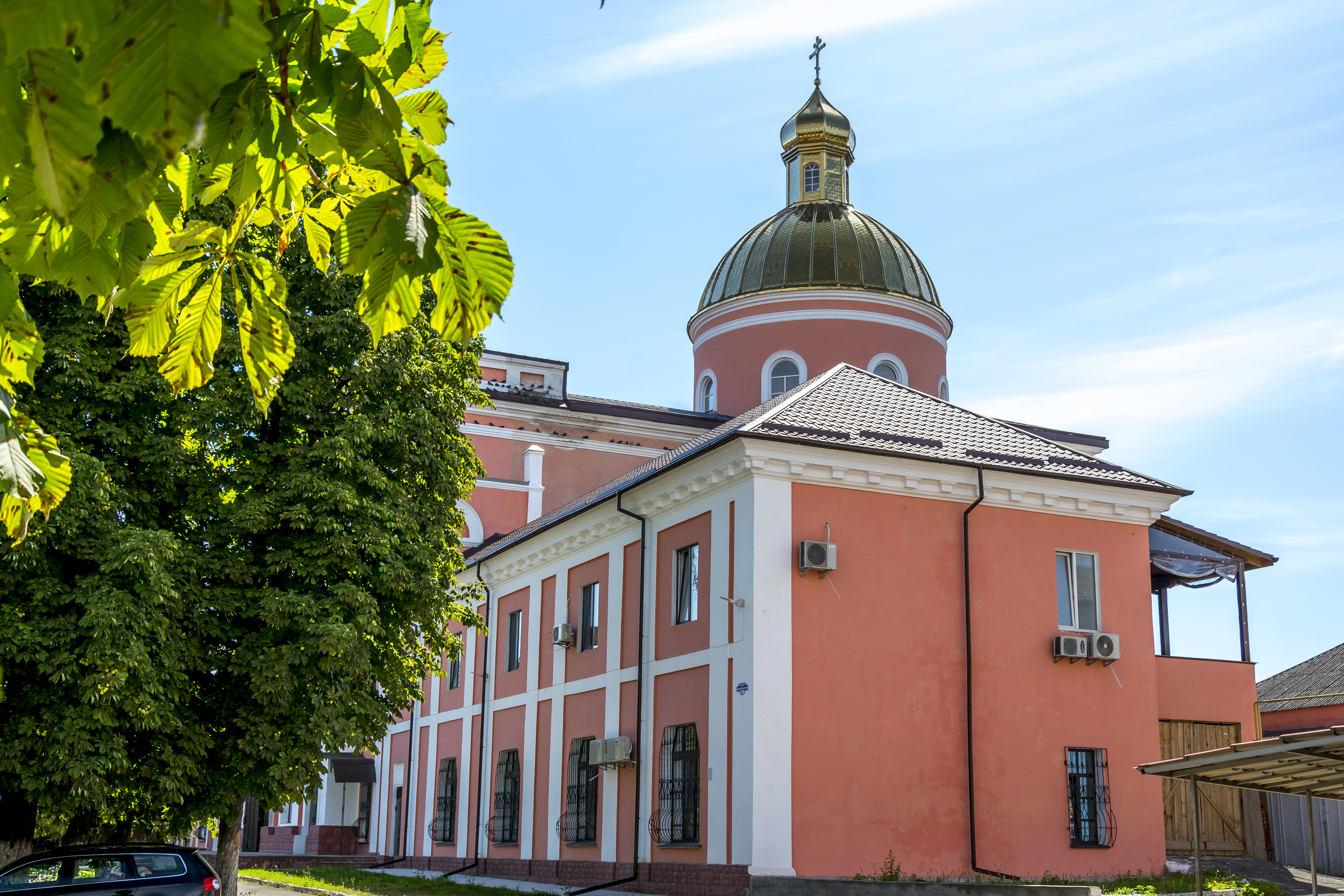
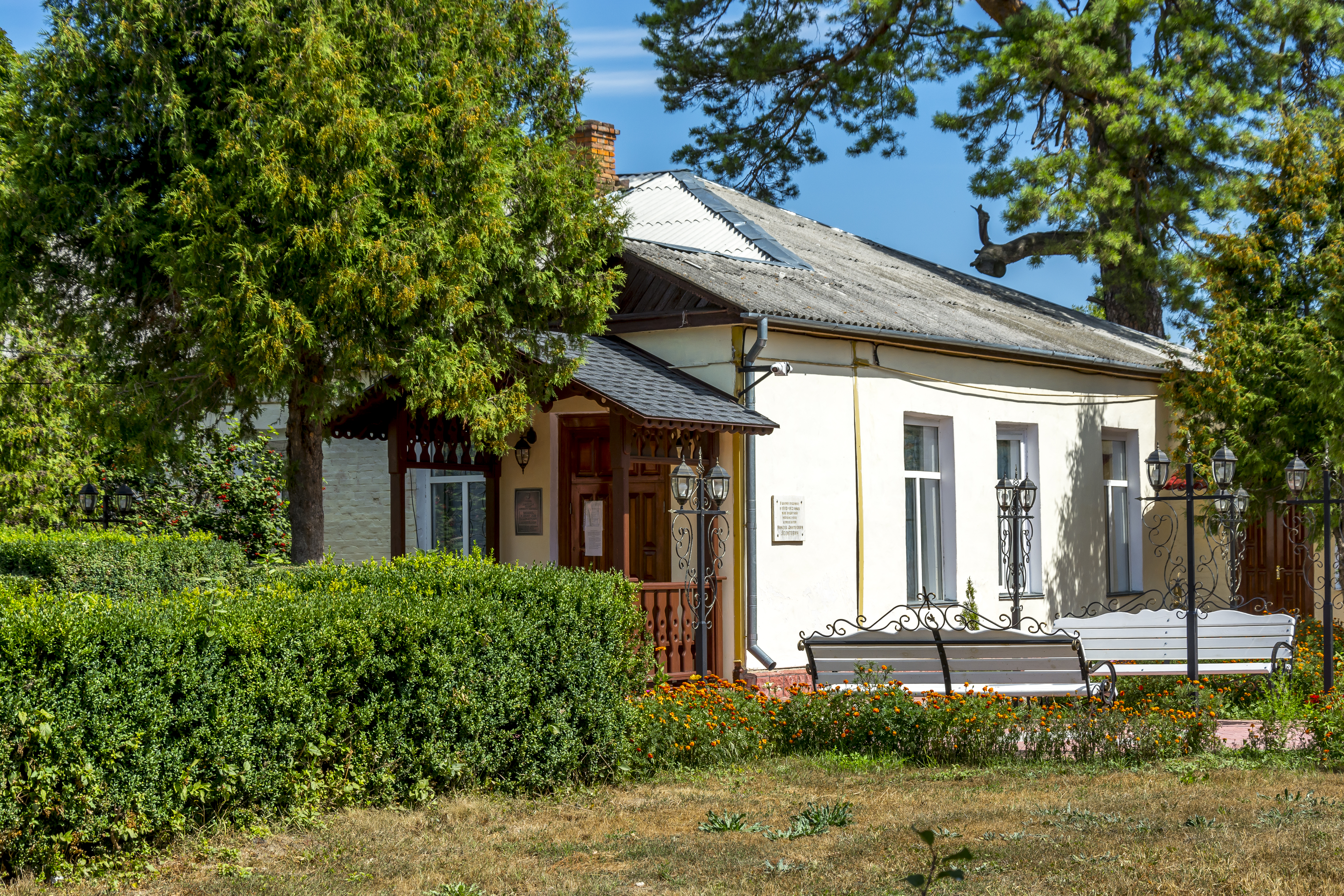
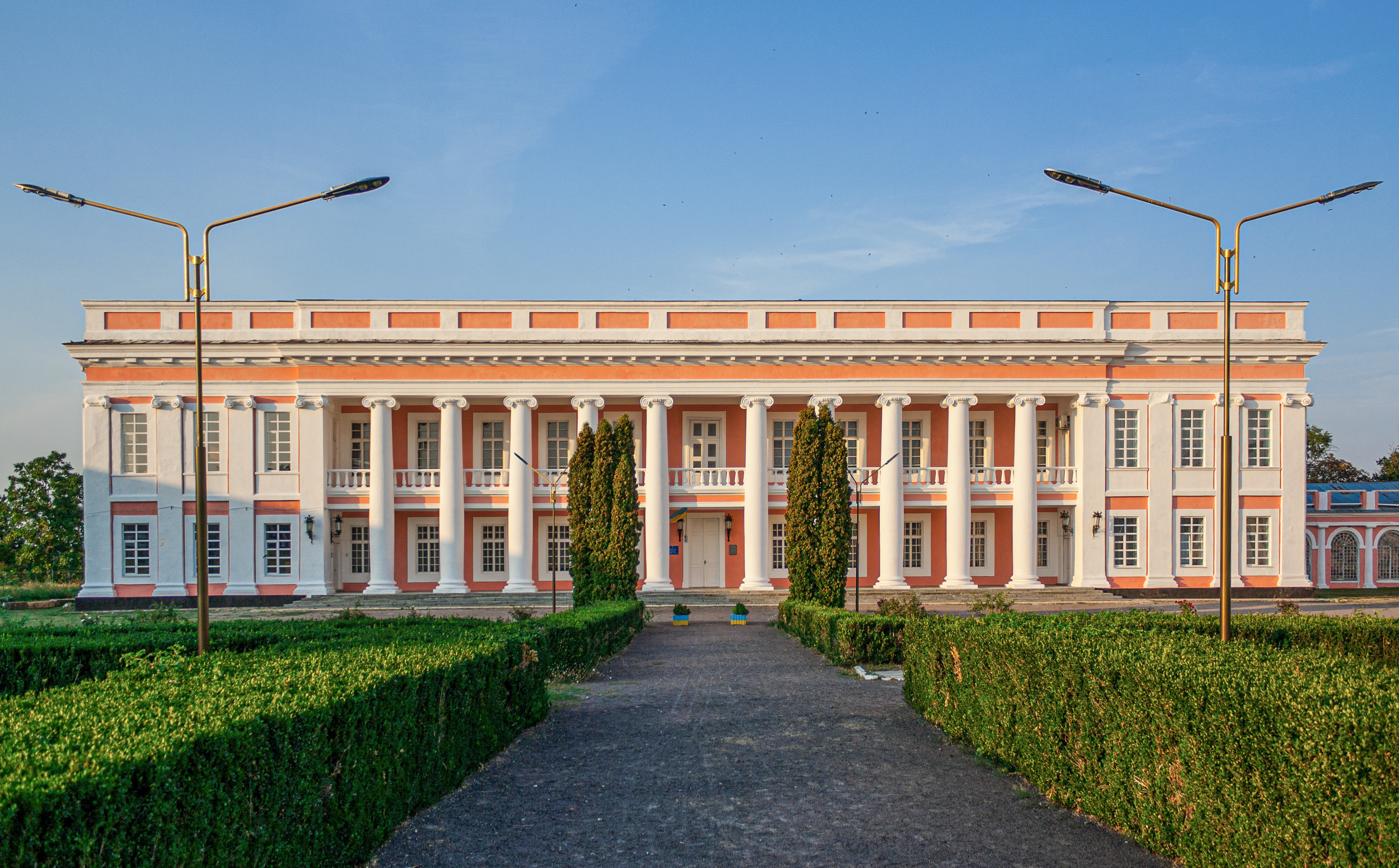
- Cityscape Nativity of Christ Cathedral House of Mykola Leontovych Potocki Palace

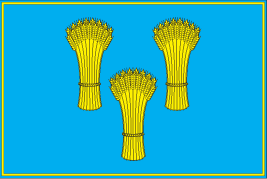
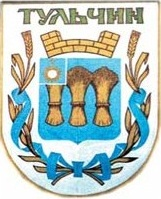
- Flag Coat of arms

- Location within Vinnytsia Oblast Location within Ukraine
- Coordinates: 48°40′28″N 28°50′59″E
- Country: Ukraine
- Oblast: Vinnytsia Oblast
- Raion: Tulchyn Raion
- Hromada: Tulchyn urban hromada
- Founded: 1607

Area
  - Total: 9.26 km^{2} (3.58 sq mi)
- Elevation: 208 m (682 ft)

Population (2023)
  - Total: 13,896
  - Density: 1,500/km^{2} (3,890/sq mi)
- Postal code: 23600–23606
- Area code: +380 4335

Tulchyn (Ukrainian: Тульчин, IPA: [tʊlʲˈtʃɪn]; Latin: Tulcinum; Polish: Tulczyn; Russian: Тульчин, romanized: Tulchin; Yiddish: טולטשין; Romanian: Tulcin) is a city in Vinnytsia Oblast (province) of western Ukraine, in the historical region of Podolia. It is the administrative center of Tulchyn Raion (district). Its population is 13,896 (2023 estimate).

== History ==
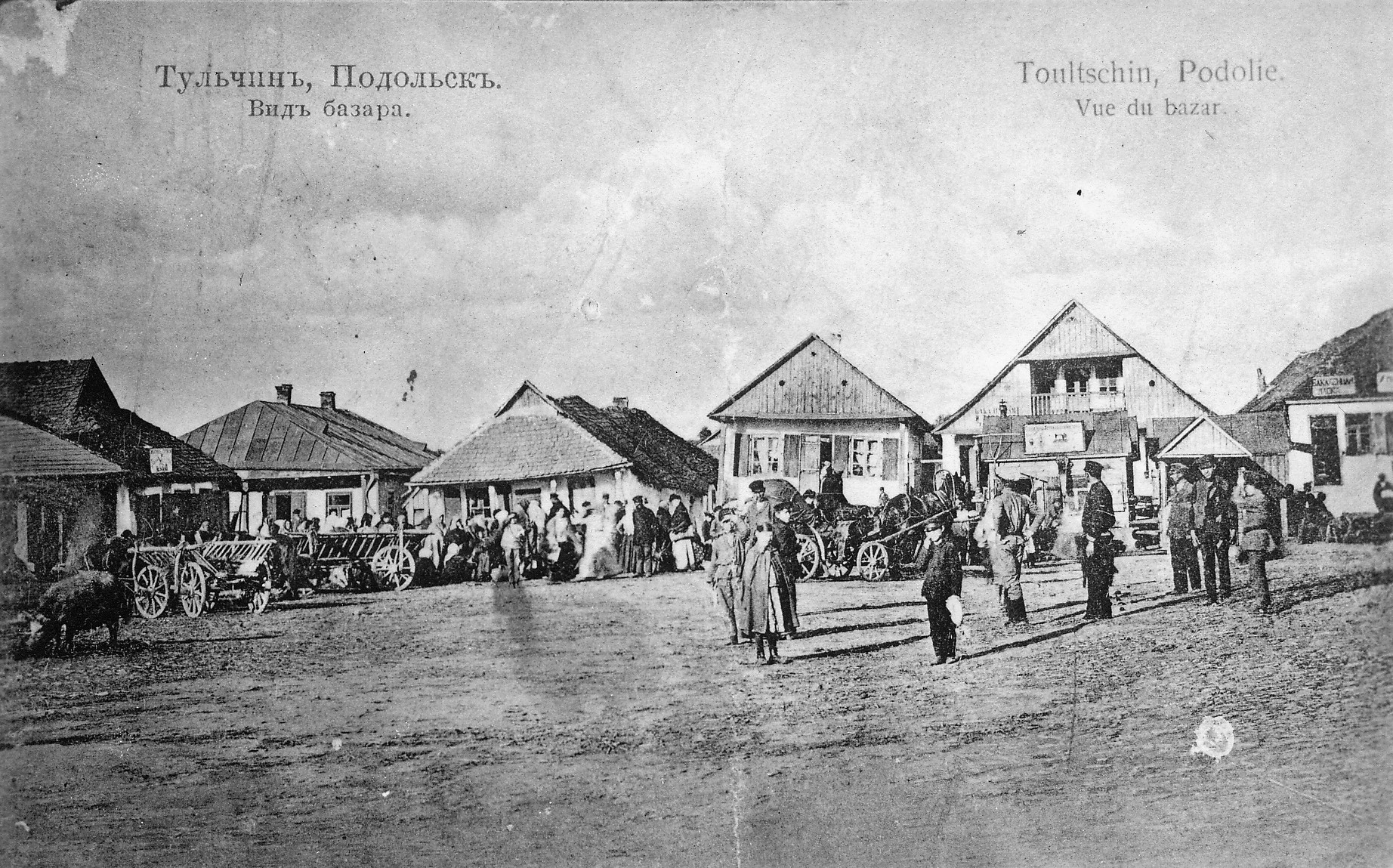
Tulchyn in 1908

Tulchyn was first mentioned in written sources in 1607, under the name Nestervar. It was a royal city in the Bracław Voivodeship in the Lesser Poland Province of the Crown of the Kingdom of Poland. In 1609 King Sigismund III Vasa granted the town to Walenty Aleksander Kalinowski. Until 1728 Tulchyn was part of the estates of the Polish magnates of the Kalinowski family (other distinguished members of Tulchyn family were Adam Kalinowski and Marcin Kalinowski), and then passed into the hands of Stanisław Potocki bypassing other Kalinowskis' branch, then in 1734 to Franciszek Salezy Potocki and his son Stanisław Szczęsny Potocki, who was the most memorable and infamous member of the Tulchyn branch of the Potocki family. During the Targowica confederation Tulchyn was the headquarters of the confederates. The 14th Polish Infantry Regiment was formed in Tulchyn in 1785 and garrisoned there. In 1787, Tulchyn received Magdeburg rights. The 6th National Cavalry Brigade and 12th Infantry Regiment were stationed there in 1789.

In 1793, the Russian Empire annexed Tulchyn as part of the Second Partition of Poland. In the 1820s, Tulchyn was a centre of the movement plotting the Decembrist revolt against the Tsarist regime of Russia. A local branch of the Union of Prosperity was located in the city.

=== Jewish community ===
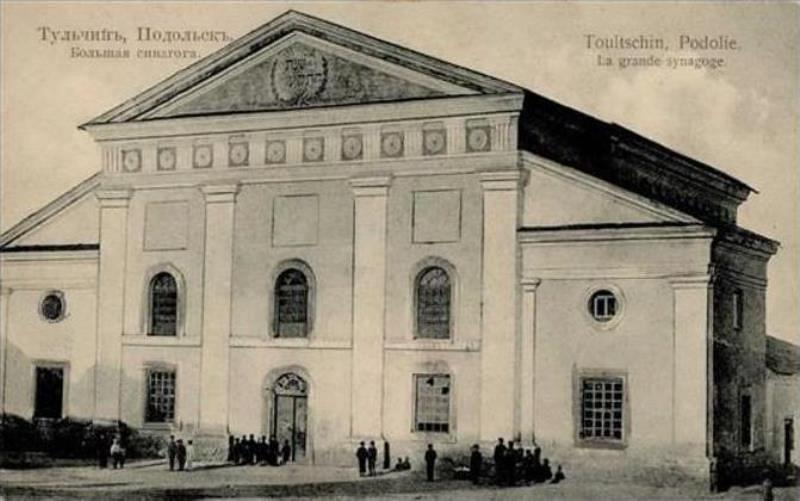
Great Synagogue in 1910

Tulchyn had a large and long-established Jewish community. Jews were present in the town by the mid-17th century and suffered massacres during the Khmelnytsky Uprising and later attacks by the Haidamaks in 1743 and 1768. The community subsequently recovered and expanded considerably during the 19th century. In the 1897 Russian census, 10,055 Jews lived in Tulchyn, comprising approximately 62 percent of the town's population. Tulchyn developed into an important Jewish centre in Podolia, with a large synagogue and numerous prayer houses, while many Jews worked as merchants and artisans.

During the Russian Civil War, Tulchyn repeatedly changed hands and its Jewish population suffered a series of pogroms. The most severe took place in 1919; approximately 170 Jews were killed in an attack on 1 July, and more than 200 Jews were killed in pogroms in the town during the civil-war period as a whole. Under Soviet rule, Tulchyn retained a substantial Jewish population and had a Yiddish-language school, a Jewish state council and a Jewish court. In 1926, 7,708 Jews lived in the town, constituting 44.3 percent of its population; by 1939, the Jewish population had declined to approximately 5,500.

=== World War II and the Holocaust ===
Tulchyn had a large Jewish community before World War II. Under Soviet rule, Jewish religious and communal life was increasingly restricted, although the town remained an important Jewish population centre in the region.

Following the German invasion of the Soviet Union in June 1941, some Jews from Tulchyn were mobilized into the Red Army or fled eastward. German and Romanian forces occupied the town in July 1941. During the initial occupation, Jews were subjected to robbery, violence and anti-Jewish restrictions.

In the autumn of 1941, Tulchyn was incorporated into the Romanian-administered Transnistria Governorate and became the administrative centre of Tulcin County. Romanian authorities established a ghetto in the town, where the surviving local Jews were confined. Jews deported from Bessarabia and Bukovina were also brought into Tulcin County as part of the Romanian government's mass deportations to Transnistria.

The Tulchyn ghetto served in part as a collection point for Jews before their deportation to the Pechora concentration camp, located approximately 20 kilometres (12 mi) from the town. Romanian authorities began transferring Jews from Tulchyn to Pechora in the autumn of 1941. Pechora was established on the grounds of a former sanatorium and became one of the principal concentration camps for Jews in Romanian-controlled Transnistria. Prisoners received little or no food and inadequate shelter or medical care, and thousands died from starvation, exposure and disease or were killed while attempting to escape.

Jews who remained in Tulchyn and elsewhere in the county were subjected to forced labour. Some were employed in a peat bog outside the town, where many died from the conditions. Romanian authorities also supplied Jewish labourers from Tulcin County to German-controlled territory east of the Southern Bug. Some Jews sent across the river were murdered immediately by German forces, while others were worked under lethal conditions before being killed.

In June 1942, Romanian authorities deported thousands of Jews, predominantly deportees from Chernivtsi and elsewhere in Bukovina, from Tulcin County across the Southern Bug into German-controlled territory. More than 3,000 of these Jews died, most after being transferred to German custody. Deportations to Pechora and other forced-labour sites further reduced the Jewish population of the county.

Despite the mass mortality and deportations, thousands of Jews remained alive in Tulcin County during the later years of the occupation. A Romanian gendarmerie census of 1 September 1943 recorded 2,344 surviving Jewish deportees in the county, including 1,849 from Bukovina and 495 from Bessarabia. On 1 November 1943, Romanian authorities recorded a total Jewish population of 3,371 in Tulcin County, including both local Ukrainian Jews and deportees from Romanian territories.

Romanian occupation of Tulchyn ended during the Soviet westward advance in March 1944. The Red Army recaptured the town, ending the Romanian administration of Tulcin County and allowing the surviving Jews in the area to leave the ghettos and camps.

=== Recent history ===
As of 2005, the city had a population of 16,136 people.

In December 2022, as part of the derussification in Ukraine intensified by the full-scale Russian invasion of Ukraine that began that year, monuments to Alexander Pushkin and Alexander Suvorov were taken down in Tulchyn.

== Landmarks ==
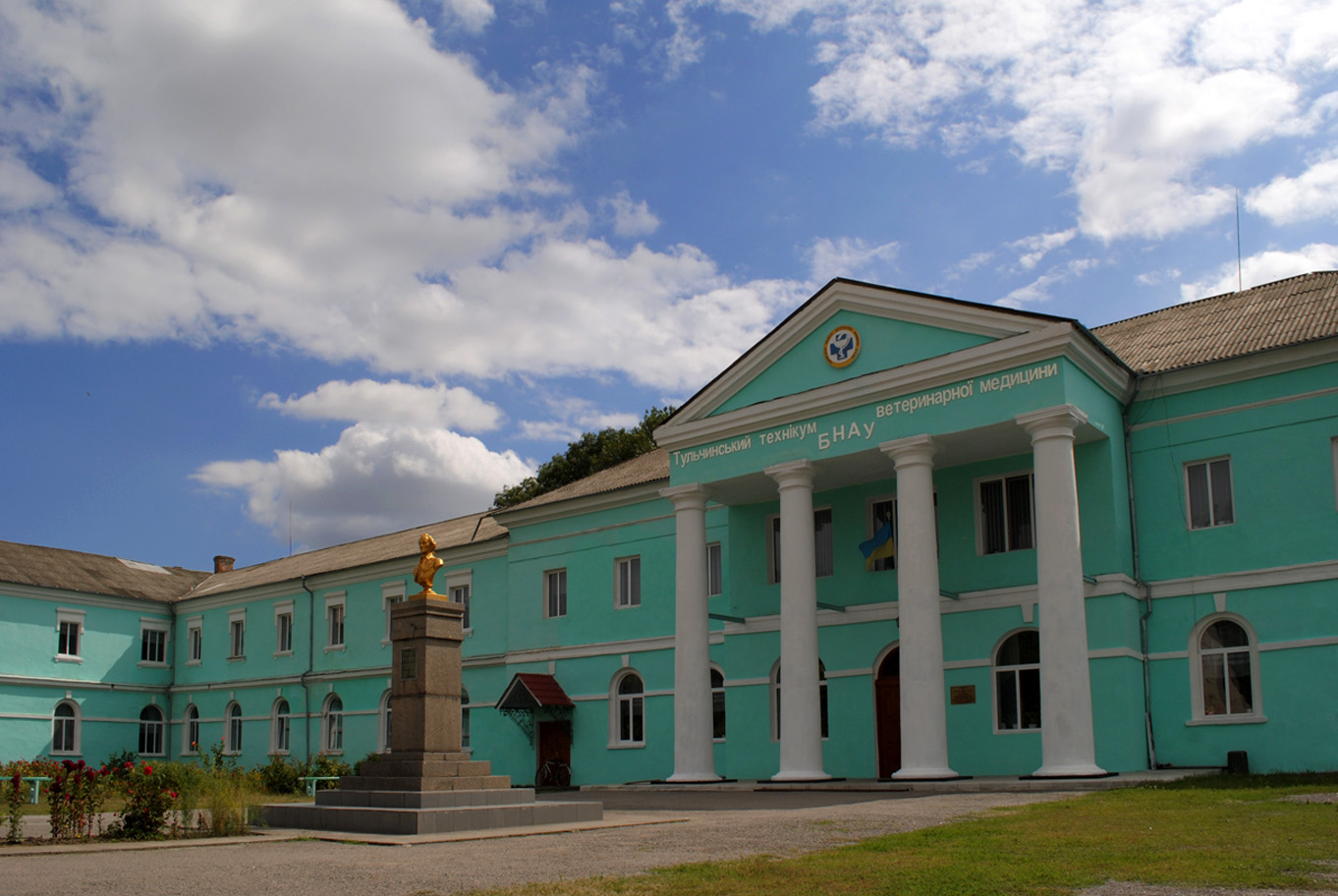
New Potocki Palace

An important landmark of the city is the palace of the Potocki family, built according to the principles of Palladian architecture according to the plans drafted by Joseph Lacroix during the 1780s.

== Gallery ==
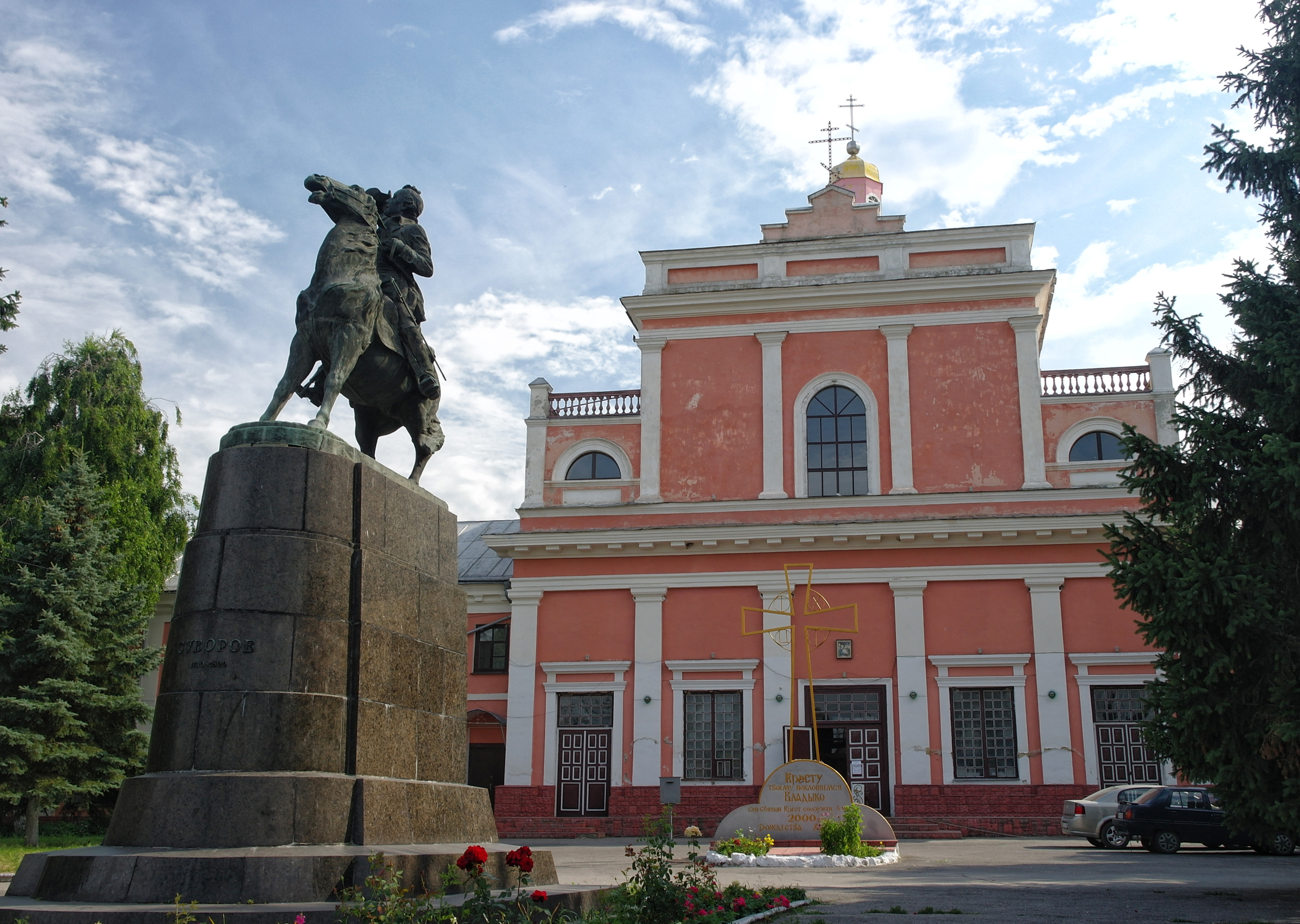
Dominican Church

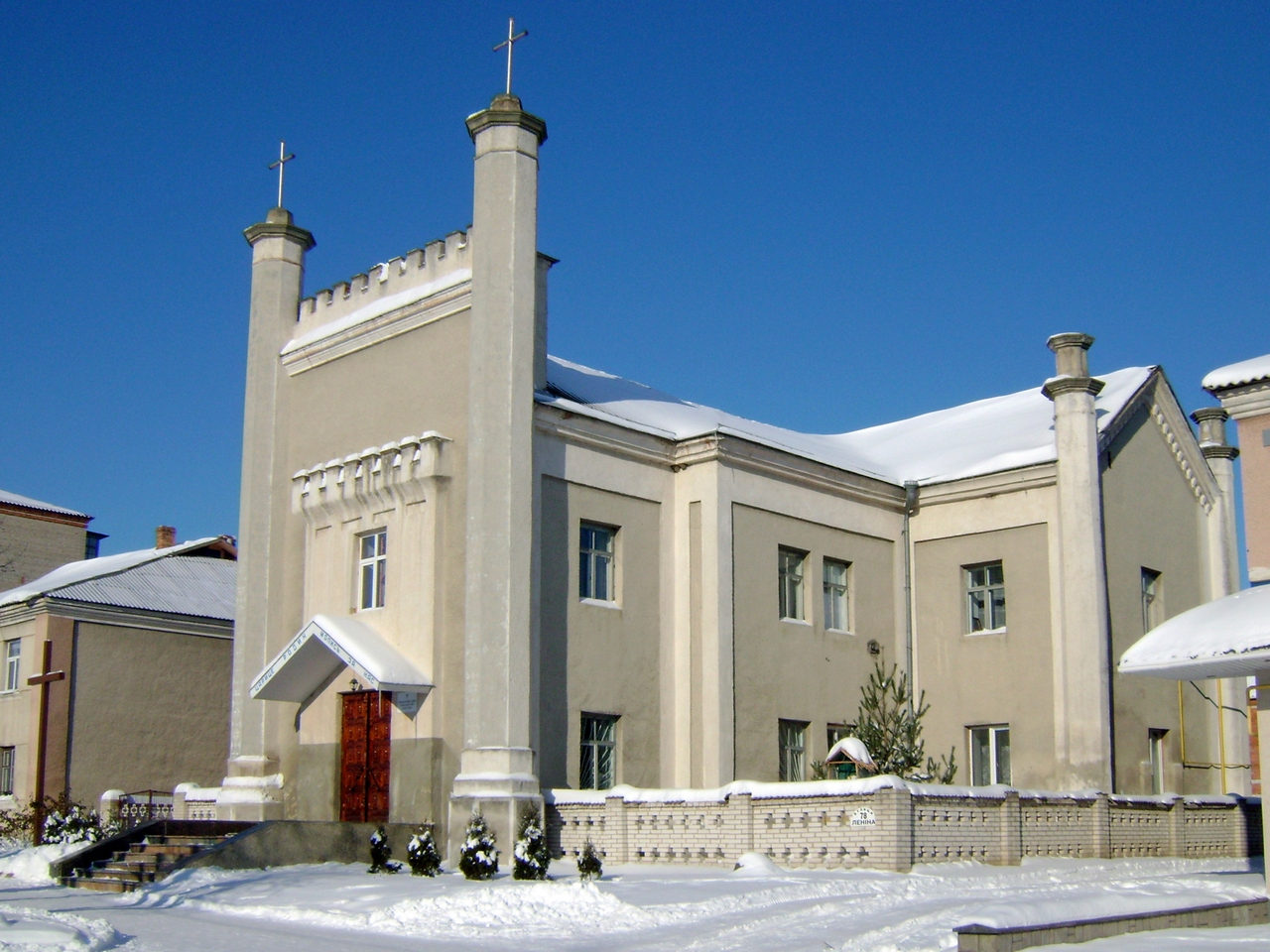
Catholic church

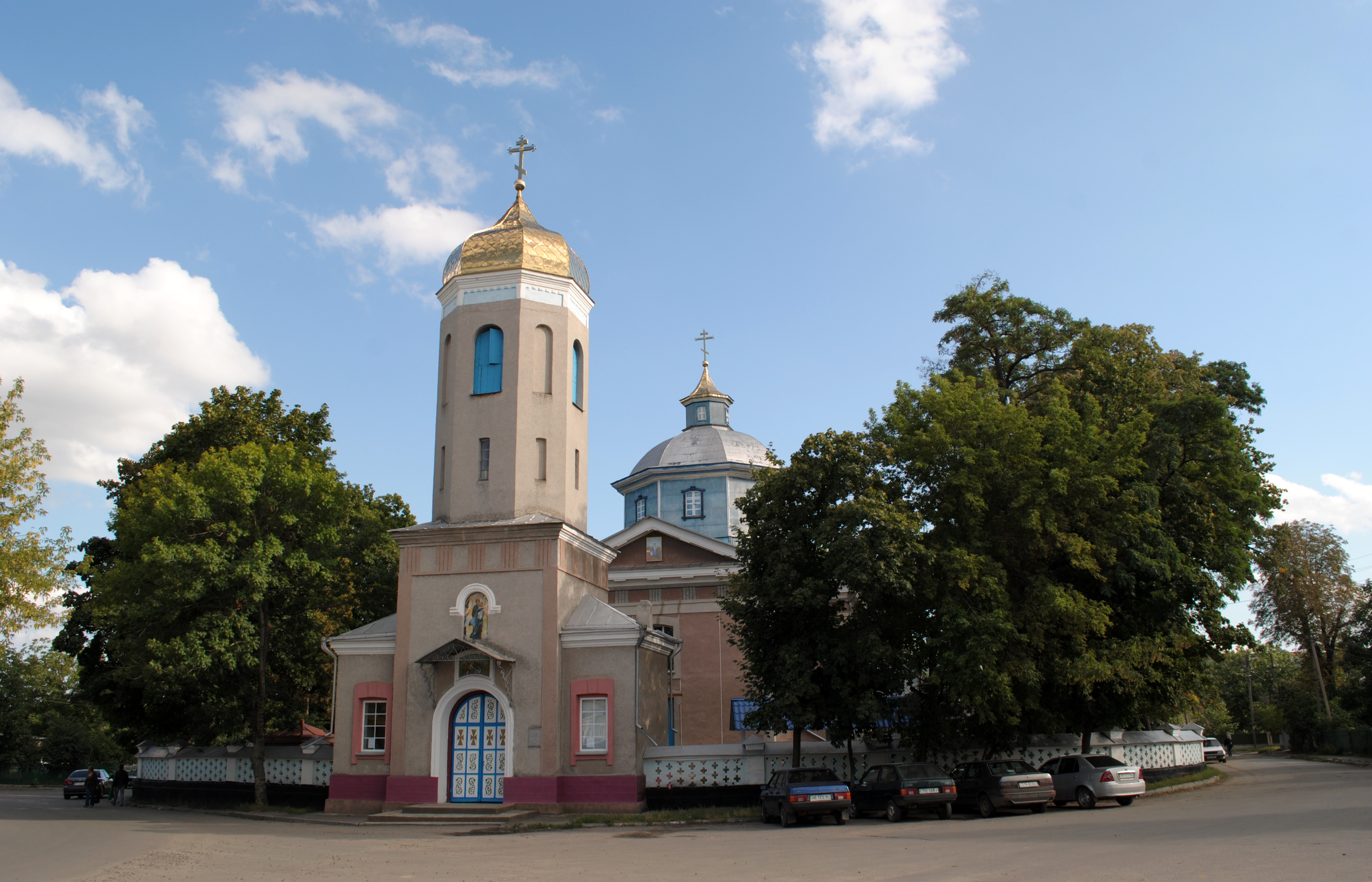
Church of the Assumption

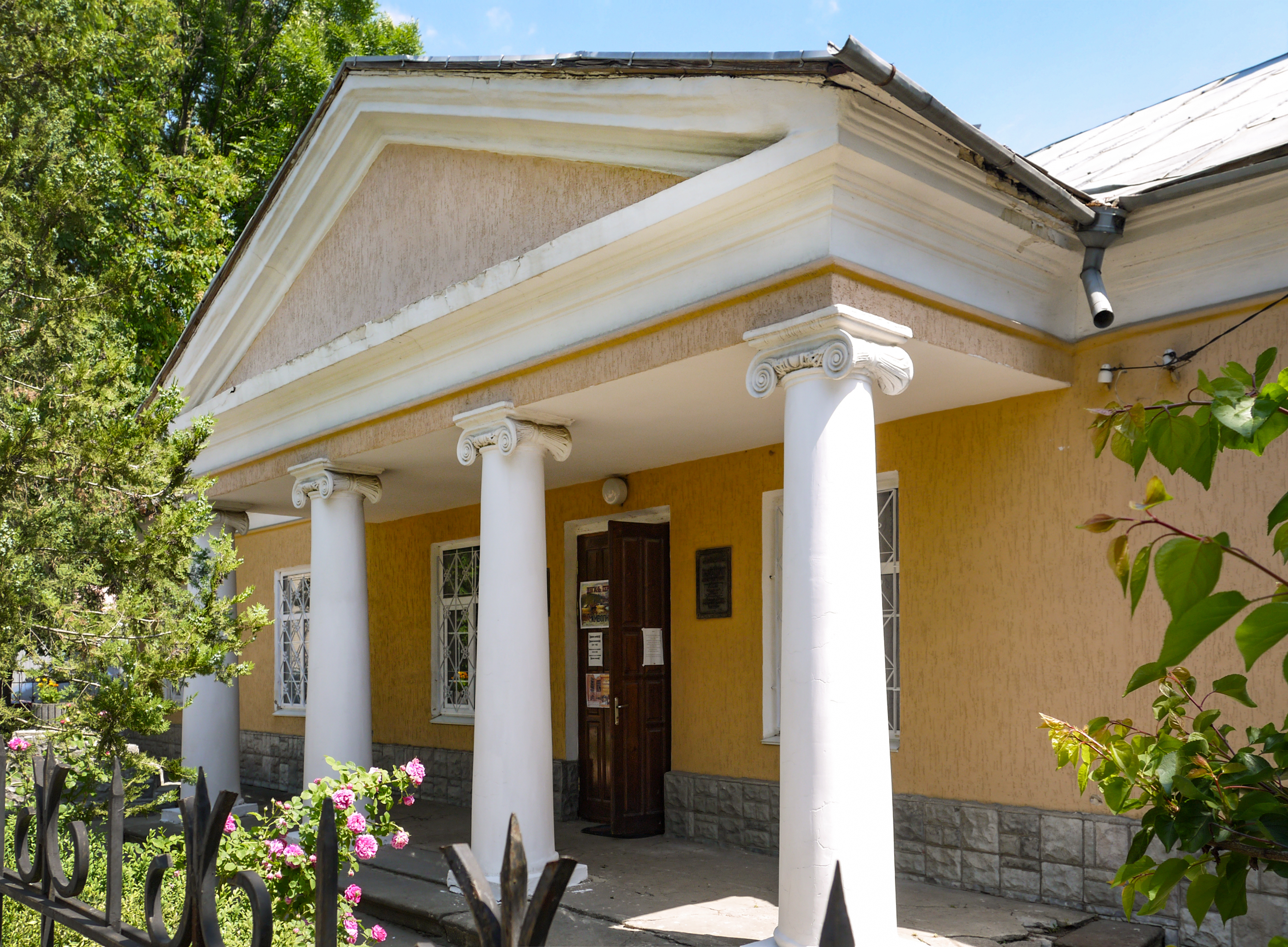
City museum

== Notable people ==
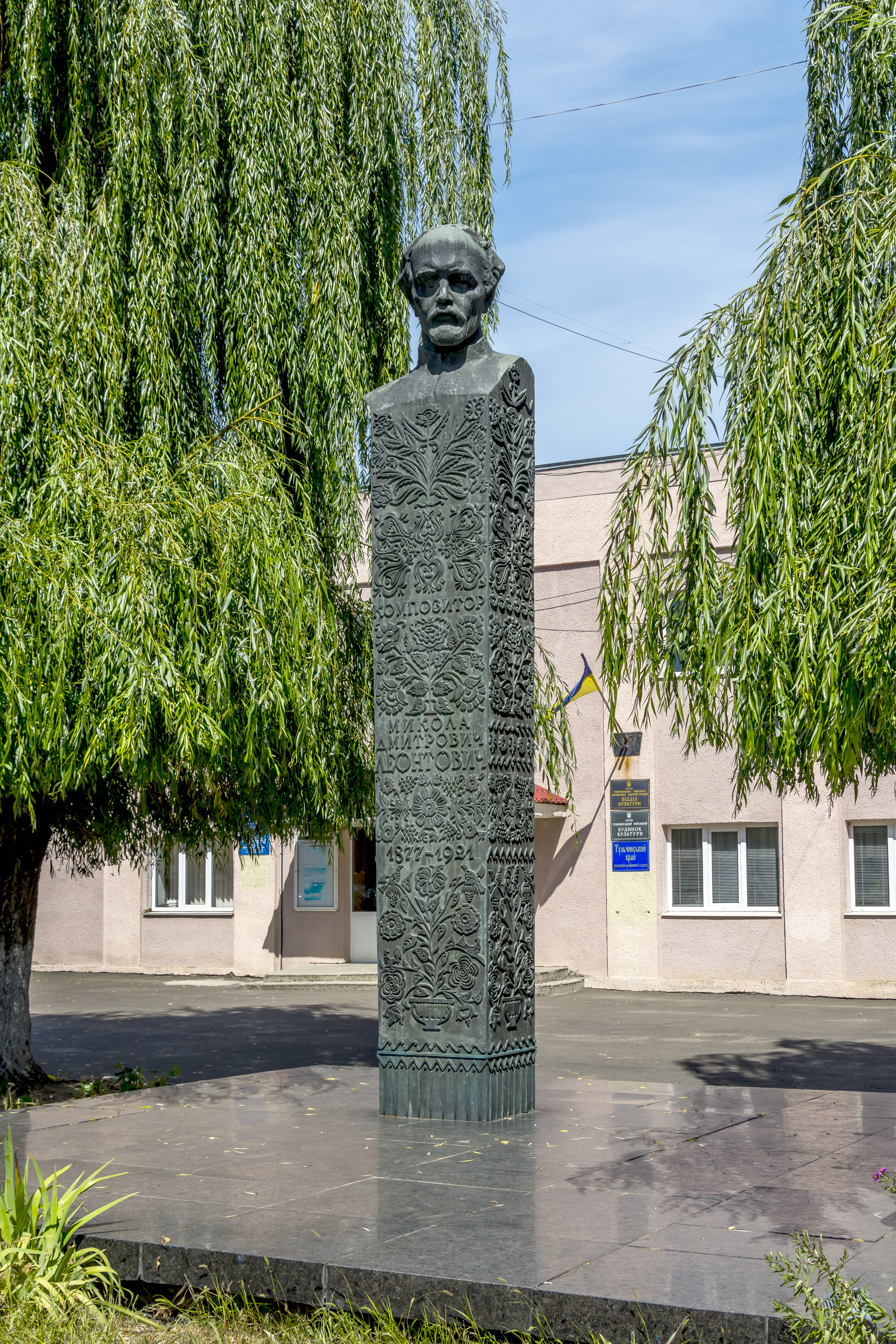
Monument to Mykola Leontovych

- Stanisław Trembecki (1739–1812), Polish poet
- Włodzimierz Potocki (1789–1812), Polish Count, artillery colonel
- Mieczysław Potocki (1799–1878), Polish magnate, owner of estates in Tulczyn, one of the richest Poles in the 19th century
- Alexander Veltman (1800–1870), the Russian writer, was stationed here for some years (and met Pushkin here)
- Józef Wysocki (1809–1873), Polish military commander, general of Polish Army, participant of Polish National Uprisings and the Hungarian Revolution of 1848
- Marian Dziewicki (1872–1935), Polish lawyer, President of Wilno, local government activist
- Bronisław Matyjewicz-Maciejewicz (1882–1911), Polish aviator
- Mykola Leontovych (1877–1921), the Ukrainian composer (who composed the Carol of the Bells), lived here
- Sophie Tucker, Ukrainian-born American singer, comedian, actress, and radio personality

== See also ==
- History of the Jews in Bessarabia
- History of the Jews in Transnistria
- History of the Jews in Bukovina
