= Metal-Forum of Ukraine =

Metal-Forum of Ukraine (Ukrainian: "Метал-Форум Україна") is the greatest international exhibition of Ukraine in the metal branch. This trade fair is held in autumn of every year on KyivExpoPlaza in Kyiv the capital of Ukraine. The conference "Metal: Management, production, trade and consumption" is part of the Metal-Forum. The participants discuss the economics of the metal market as well as new technologies.

Ukraine is one of the top ten steel producers in the world.

The Metal-Forum of Ukraine 2008 will be held from 22 to 24 October 2008.

The organisers of Metal-Forum of Ukraine are:

- Ukrainian National Research and Information Center for Monitoring Commodity Markets DerzhZovnishInform
- Ukrainian Association of Metal Traders
- Infor-Metal
- The Industrial Association Metallurgprom

The exhibition is sponsored by the Ministry for Economics and Questions of European Integration of Ukraine and the Ministry for Industrial Policies of Ukraine.
