= Central European mixed forests =

Terrestrial ecoregion in central and eastern Europe

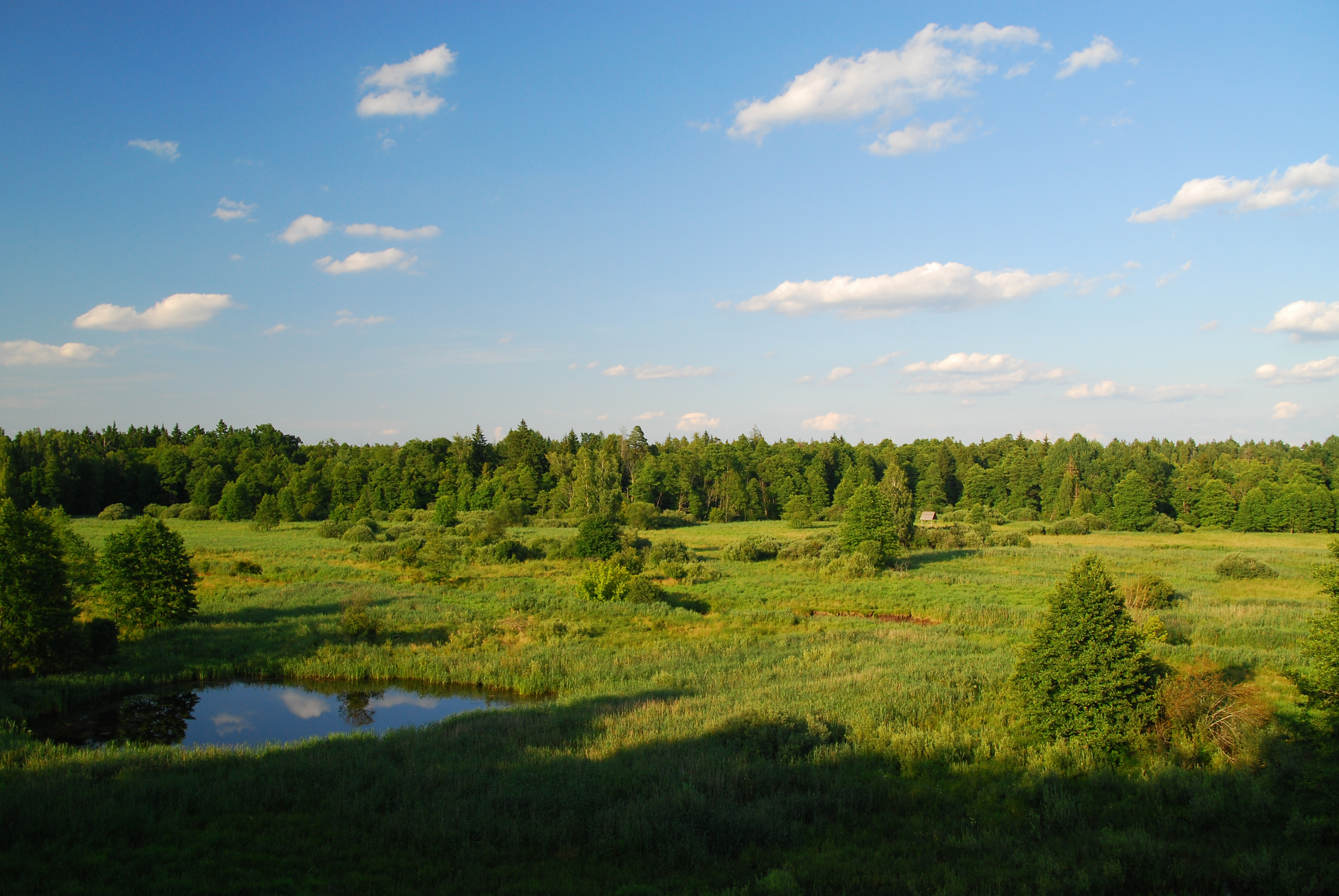
- Białowieski National Park, in the ecoregion

- Ecoregion territory (in purple)

Ecology
- Realm: Palearctic
- Biome: Temperate broadleaf and mixed forest
- Borders: List: Western European broadleaf forests; Carpathian montane conifer forests; Pannonian mixed forests; Balkan mixed forests; East European forest steppe; Pontic steppe; Sarmatic mixed forests; Baltic mixed forests; European Atlantic mixed forests

Geography
- Area: 731,154 km^{2} (282,300 mi^{2})
- Countries: List: Austria; Belarus; Czech Republic; Germany; Lithuania; Moldova; Poland; Romania; Russia; Ukraine
- Coordinates: 52°23′N 23°06′E

Conservation
- Conservation status: critical/endangered
- Protected: 19.86%

The Central European mixed forests ecoregion (WWF ID: PA0412) is a temperate hardwood forest covering much of northeastern Europe, from Germany to Russia. The area is only about one-third forested, with pressure from human agriculture leaving the rest in a patchwork of traditional pasture, meadows, wetlands. The ecoregion is in the temperate broadleaf and mixed forest biome, and the Palearctic realm, with a Humid Continental climate. It covers 731,154 km^{2} (282,300 sq mi).

== Location and description ==
The ecoregion covers the formerly-glaciated central plains of Central Europe, from eastern Germany and the shores of the Baltic Sea, through large parts of the Czech Republic, Poland, Southern Lithuania, Belarus, Western and Central Ukraine, and a part of Russia (in Bryansk and Kaliningrad Oblasts). The terrain is mostly flat lowlands in the center, hilly moraine-dominated in the north, and uplands to the south along the Carpathian Mountains. To the north is the Sarmatic mixed forests ecoregion, the forests of which feature more spruce and pine. To the east is the East European forest steppe, in which the forest stands thin out into grasslands. To the south is the Carpathian montane forests ecoregion, featuring mountain pastures and forests of beech, spruce, elm, and dwarf pine. Also to the north are the Baltic mixed forests of oaks, hornbeam, and linden trees on flat, acidic soils. To the west is the Western European broadleaf forests ecoregion, which is now mostly cultivated agricultural land.

== Climate ==
The portions of the ecoregion in Germany and western Poland have a climate that is classified as Marine west coast (Cfb). The eastern part has a climate of Humid continental climate, warm summer (Köppen climate classification (Dfb)). This climate is characterized by large seasonal temperature differentials and a warm summer (at least four months averaging over 10 °C (50 °F), but no month averaging over 22 °C (72 °F). The summers become hotter and the winters colder as you move east across the ecoregion, due to the movement towards the center of the continent ("continentality"). The mean January temperature is −1 °C (30 °F) in Germany to −6 °C (21 °F) in Belarus. Precipitation average between 500 mm and 700 mm, mostly falling during the summer growing season.

== Flora and fauna ==
Oak forests are characteristic throughout the region, with some pine forests in the north. Forest cover ranges from 15% in Ukraine to 33% in the Czech Republic. The most common tree in the ecoregion, covering half of the forested area, is Scots pine (Pinus sylvestris), Norway spruce (Picea abies), English oak (Quercus robur), Sycamore maple (Acer pseudoplatanus), and Silver birch (Betula pendula), which has been planted extensively over the past 200 years. The truly mixed deciduous forests which mostly consist of Quercus robur, Quercus petraea, Picea abies, Alnus glutinosa, Fagus sylvatica, Taxus baccata, Acer pseudoplatanus, Malus sylvestris, Viburnum lantana, Fraxinus excelsior, Tilia cordata, Aesculus hippocastanum, Rhamnus cathartica, Ulmus glabra, Ulmus minor, Populus alba, Salix alba, Pinus sylvestris, Betula pendula, Populus tremula, Populus nigra, Juglans regia, Juniperus communis, Prunus padus and Corylus avellana, have been replaced mostly by agriculture. The non-forested areas are largely meadows and pastures dedicated to human agricultural uses. There are also extensive wetlands in the lowlands. The wetlands support diverse bird communities, but mammals are heavily pressured by human land use. Because of the uniformity of the terrain and openness to other regions, there are no endemic species in the ecoregion. In some countries, 20-30 of the mammal species are threatened.

=== European bison ===
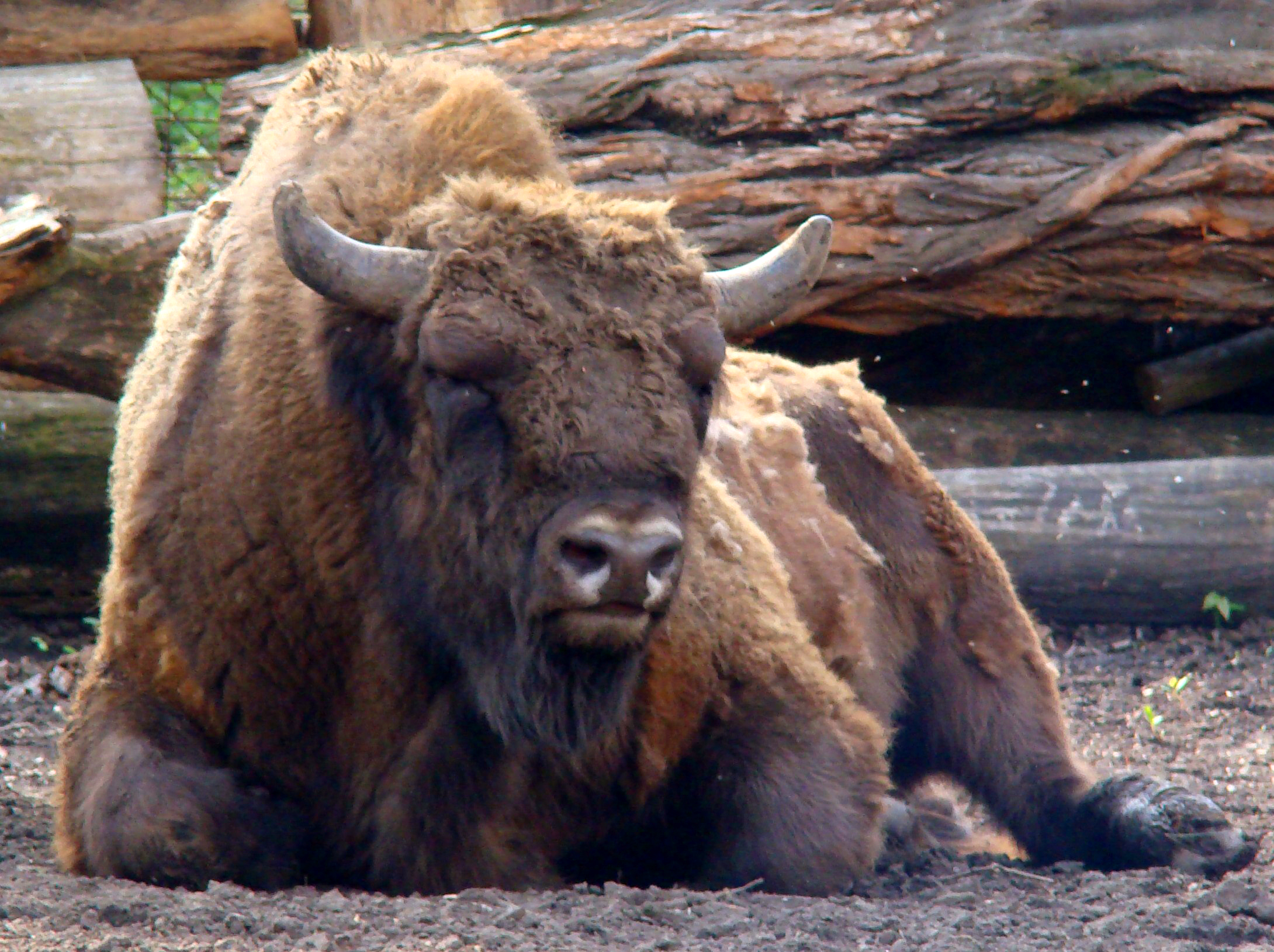
Rare European bison in Białowieża forest.

The Białowieża Forest on the Belarus-Poland border is home to one of the last herds of European bison, also known as wisent, the heaviest surviving wild land animal in Europe Historically, the wisent's range encompassed all of the European lowlands, extending from the Massif Central to the Caucasus. Its range decreased as growing human populations cut down trees. The European bison became extinct in southern Sweden in the 11th century, and southern England in the 12th century. The species survived in the Ardennes and the Vosges until the 15th century before being hunted to extinction. In mid-16th century Grand Duke of Lithuania and King of Poland Sigismund II Augustus pronounced a death penalty for poaching a European bison in Białowieża. Despite these measures, its population continued to decline. During World War I, occupying German troops killed 600 wisent for food, hides, and horns. The last wild European bison in Poland was killed in 1919. They were reintroduced from captivity.

== History ==
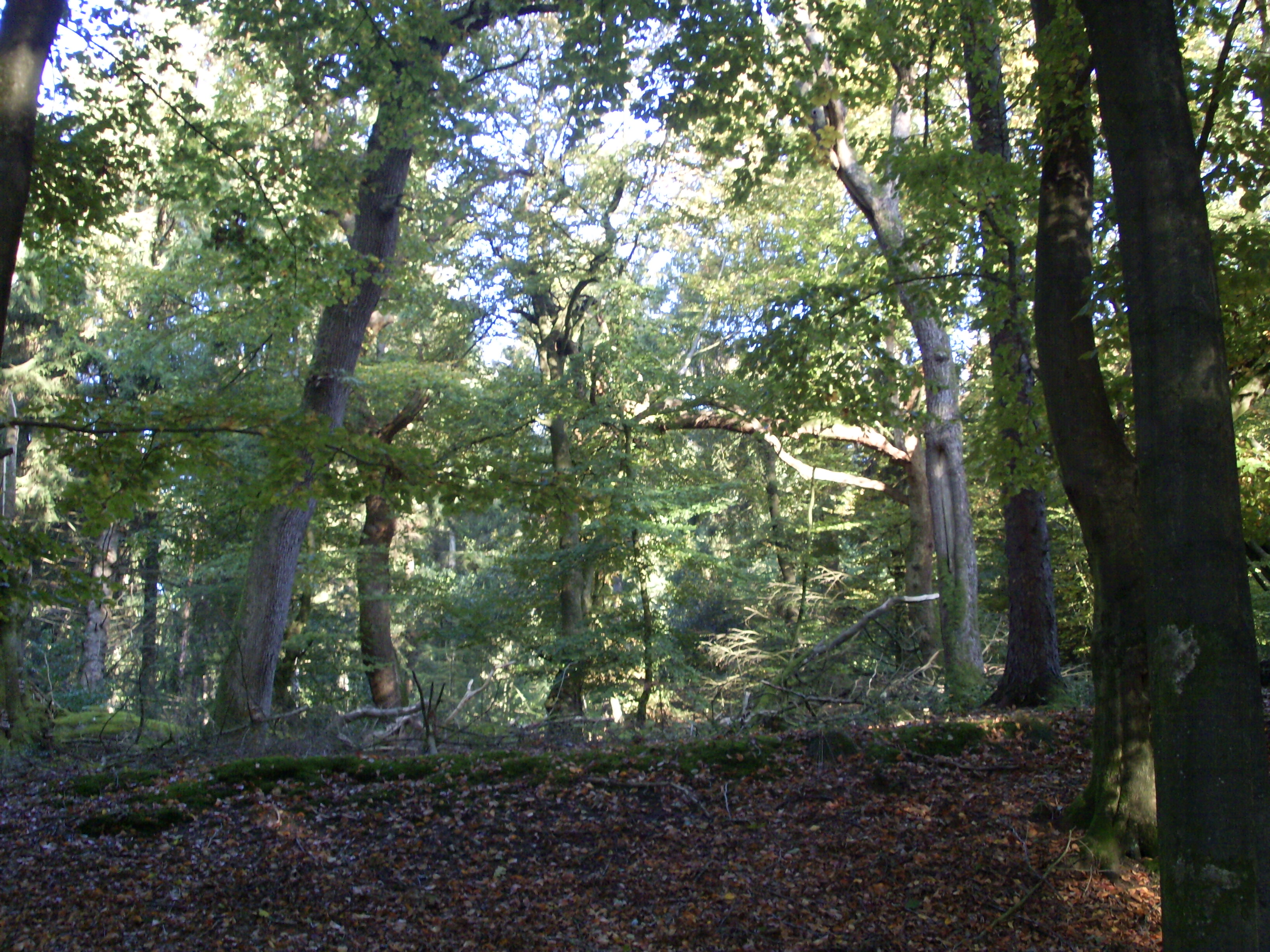
Handewitter Forest in Schleswig-Holstein, North Germany

The history of Central European forests is characterised by thousands of years of exploitation by people. Thus a distinction needs to be made between the botanical natural history of the forest in pre- and proto-historical times—which falls mainly into the fields of natural history and Paleobotany—and the onset of the period of sedentary settlement which began at the latest in the Neolithic era in Central Europe - and thus the use of the forest by people, which is covered by the disciplines of history, archaeology, cultural studies and ecology.

The definition of Central Europe is a (sometimes heated) area of debate, and isn't used with consistent meaning across fields of study, encyclopedias and dictionaries, cultures or natural and political borders.

In rough terms the general area both geographically and ecologically is situated between the North Sea, the Alps, the Baltic Sea and the Black Sea.

== Protected areas ==
The Central European mixed forests has been affected heavily by human activity.

19.86% of the ecoregion is in protected areas. Most protected areas are small and fragmented. Some of the large, or more representative, protected areas in the ecoregion include:

- Białowieża Forest (Belarus, Poland), the last large fragment of Old-growth forest that used to stretch across the European Plain. (Area: 3,086 km^{2})

Name	Country	Year	km²	IUCN	Notes
Aukštadvaris Regional Park	Lithuania	1992	170	V	
Belovezhskaya Pushcha National Park	Belarus	1932	1500	II	Belarusian part of the Białowieża Forest.
Białowieża National Park	Poland	1932	105	II	Polish part of the Białowieża Forest.
Biebrza National Park	Poland		592		Largest national park in Poland, is 25% forested, the remainder is field, meadow, and marsh.
Bryansky Les Nature Reserve	Russia		122		Area of old-growth forest on the eastern tip of the ecoregion in Bryansk Oblast.
Cheremske Nature Reserve	Ukraine		30		
Chernobyl Radiation and Ecological Biosphere Reserve	Ukraine		2269		Includes the Red Forest.
Cozia National Park	Romania		167		
Curonian Spit National Park (Lithuania)	Lithuania	1991	274	II	Includes the Parnidis Dune.
Curonian Spit National Park (Russia)	Russia	1987	66	II	Includes the Dancing Forest.
Čepkeliai Marsh	Lithuania	1993	112	Ia	Ramsar site.
Derman–Ostroh National Nature Park	Ukraine		16		
Desna–Stara Huta National Nature Park	Ukraine		162		
Dieveniškės Regional Park	Lithuania	1992	86	V	
Dniester Canyon National Nature Park	Ukraine		108		
Drawa National Park	Poland		114		
Drevlians Nature Reserve	Ukraine		309		
Dzūkija National Park	Lithuania	1991	585	II	
Hainich National Park	Germany		75		
Halych National Nature Park	Ukraine		147		Transition zone between Central European mixed forests and Carpathian montane conifer forests
Holosiiv National Nature Park	Ukraine		19		Borders on the East European forest steppe.
Kampinos National Park	Poland		384		
Kaniv Nature Reserve	Ukraine		20		Transition zone between Central European mixed forests and East European forest steppe
Kauno Marios Regional Park	Lithuania	1992	1017	V	
Khotyn National Nature Park	Ukraine		20		
Kremenets Mountains National Nature Park	Ukraine		62		
Lower Oder Valley National Park	Germany		103		
Lower Polissia National Nature Park	Ukraine		88		Representative of the Polesia area of Poland, Belarus, Ukraine and Russia.
Medobory Nature Reserve	Ukraine		105		
Meteliai Regional Park	Lithuania	1992	177	V	
Middle Elbe Biosphere Reserve	Germany		430		Stretches along the Elbe River in Saxon-Anhalt, covering the largest river-meadow complex in Middle Europe.
Narew National Park	Poland		78		Covers wetlands along the moraines of the Narew river, exemplifying a Braided river
Nemunas Delta Regional Park	Lithuania	1994	290	V	
Nemunas Loops Regional Park	Lithuania	1992	252	V	
Neris Regional Park	Lithuania	1992	100	V	Transition zone between Central European mixed forests and Sarmatic mixed forests
Northern Podillia National Nature Park	Ukraine		56		
Ojcowski National Park	Poland		22		
Orlovskoye Polesye National Park	Russia		842		
Podilski Tovtry National Nature Park	Ukraine		2613		
Podyjí National Park	Czechia		63		
Poleski National Park	Poland		98		
Polissia Nature Reserve	Ukraine		201		
Prypiat–Stokhid National Nature Park	Ukraine		393		
Prypyatskiy National Park	Belarus		635		
Raigardas Landscape Reserve	Lithuania	1960	11	V	On the Ukrainian border.
Rambynas Regional Park	Lithuania	1992	48	V	Northern edge.
Rivne Nature Reserve	Ukraine		423		
Roztocze National Park	Poland		85		
Seaside Regional Park	Lithuania	1992	56	V	Northernmost tip of the Central European mixed forests; borders on the Sarmatic mixed forests.
Shatsk National Natural Park	Ukraine		325		
Świętokrzyski National Park	Poland		76		
Thayatal National Park	Austria		13		
Trakai Historical National Park	Lithuania	1992	81	II	
Tsumanska Pushcha National Nature Park	Ukraine	2010	335	II	
Upper Pobuzhzhia National Nature Park	Ukraine		1080		
Vištytis Regional Park	Lithuania	1992	108	V	
Warta Mouth National Park	Poland	2001	81	II	Designated 1984.
Wielkopolska National Park	Poland		76		
Wigry National Park	Poland		151		
Yavoriv National Nature Park	Ukraine		71		
Zalissia National Nature Park	Ukraine		148		
Žuvintas Biosphere Reserve	Lithuania		186		

- Virtually all national parks and scientific nature reserves of Moldova are in the Central European mixed forests zone, including the Orhei National Park, the Codru Reserve and the Pădurea Domnească.
