= Derman–Ostroh National Nature Park =

National park in Ukraine

- Ukrainian: Дермансько-Острозький національний природний парк
- IUCN category II (national park)
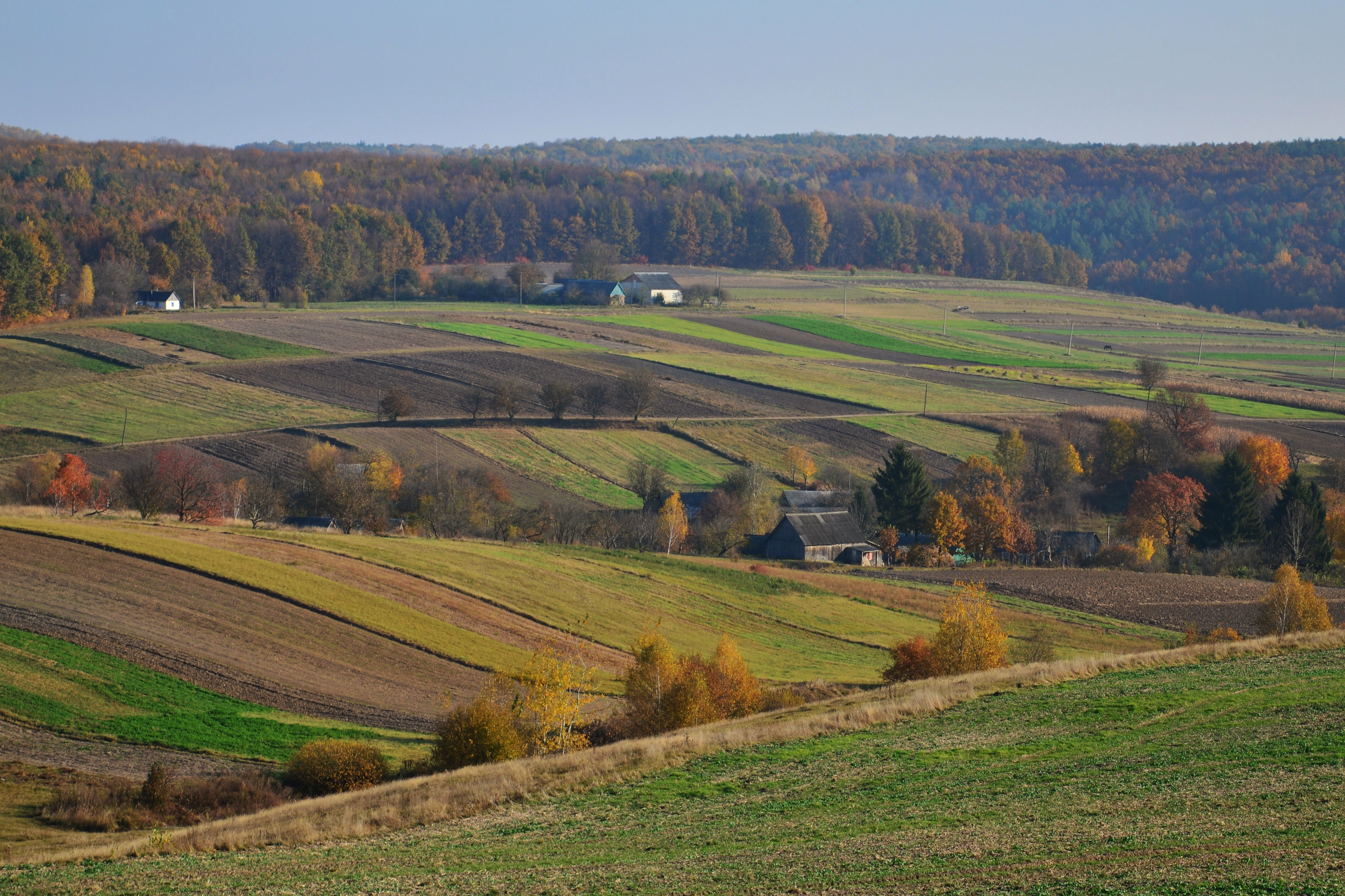
- Derman–Ostroh National Nature Park

- Location within Ukraine
- Location: Rivne Oblast, Ukraine
- Nearest city: Ostroh, Rivne Oblast
- Coordinates: 50.32916667°N 26.51972222°E
- Area: 1,647.6 hectares (4,071 acres; 16 km^{2}; 6 sq mi)
- Established: 2009
- Governing body: Ministry of Ecology and Natural Resources (Ukraine)
- Website: http://npp-derman-ostroh.wixsite.com/nppdo

The Derman–Ostroh National Nature Park (Ukrainian: Дермансько-Острозький національний природний парк) sits in a river valley that separates the southern edge of the Polesian Lowland, and the northern edge of the Podolian Upland in northwestern Ukraine. The terrain is a mixture of pine–oak forest and marshy river lowlands. The park is in the southernmost region of Rivne Raion, Rivne Oblast.

== Topography ==
The park is scattered in 22 sections along the Zbytynka River valley, which runs west-to-east between the Mizotsky Ridge (a part of the Volhynian Upland to the north) and the Kremenets mountains (to the south). The park is only a few kilometers northeast of Kremenets Mountains National Nature Park, and about 5 km west of the town of Ostroh. The valley is only 3–8 km wide, and the immediately surrounding high ground is only a few hundred meters above the valley floor. The valley floor itself is mostly an alluvial patchwork of waterlogged floodplain, first terrace, and sandy dunes.

Individual sectors of the park include:

- Bushchansky Reserve, a complex and alder and pine forests, and reed-sedge swamps,
- Zbitensky Ornithological Reserve, a protected wetland set aside for breeding birds,
- Mizotsky Ridge (Reserve), a geological reserve,
- Zbytenka River floodplain (Reserve), a protected botanical reserve, with local cultural importance,
- Olhava (Reserve), a mixed forest of conifer and deciduous trees,
- The "Budka" Forest, with rare and medicinal plants
- "Zinkiv Stone" Monument, a mixed forest on the Kremenets Mountains side, with rock outcroppings,
- "Turova's grave" Monument, a section of hornbeam-oak forest, with a 400-year-old chestnut, and a 300-year-old Linden tree.

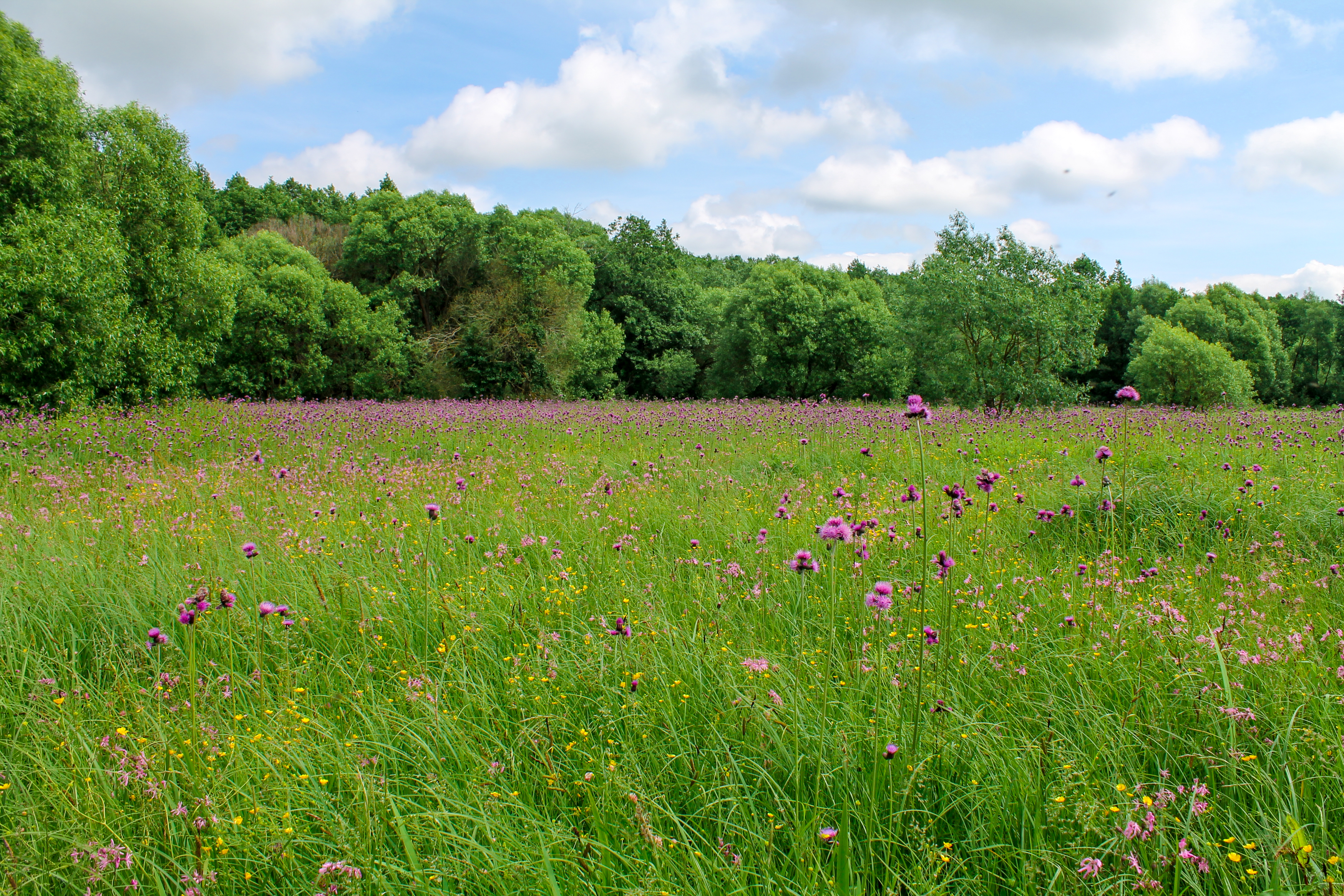
Bushchansky Nature Reserve, Derman-Ostroh NNP

== Climate and ecoregion ==
The climate of Derman-Ostroh is Humid continental climate, warm summer (Köppen climate classification (Dfb)). This climate is characterized by large swings in temperature, both diurnally and seasonally, with mild summers and cold, snowy winters.

All areas of the park are in the deciduous forest band of the Central European mixed forests ecoregion.

== Flora and fauna ==
About 50% of the region is forested, predominantly in pine and oak; there are also patches of beech and spruce. The Bashchansky bog in the park has the vegetation of lowland marsh, and is one of the Easternmost Middle European carbonate marshes.

== Public use ==
A 6.5 km educational ecological trail runs from the town of Busha on the northern ridge, south through the valley and up to a rocky prominence. There is also a 38 km ecotrail that runs along the Zbytinka river, and a 65 km bicycle trail that encircles the park. There are hotels and resorts nearby for overnight stays.

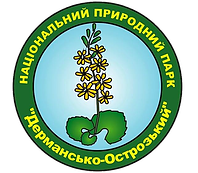
Park logo

== See also ==
- National Parks of Ukraine
