= Cheremske Nature Reserve =

Nature reserve in Ukraine

- Ukrainian: Черемський природний заповідник
- IUCN category Ia (strict nature reserve)
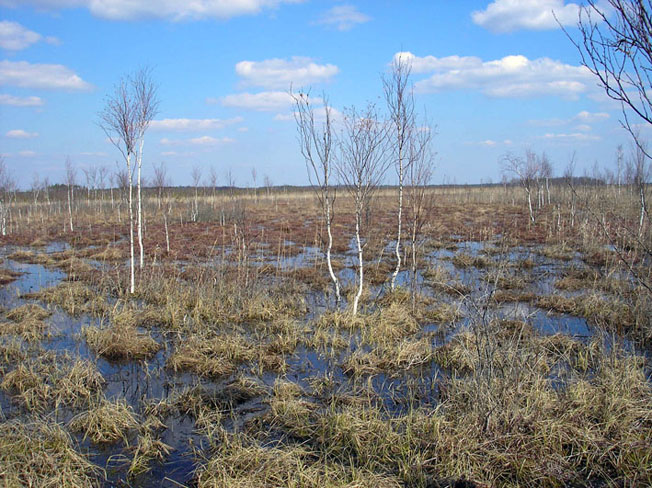
- Cheremske Nature Reserve

- Location within Ukraine
- Location: Volyn Oblast, Manevychi Raion
- Nearest city: Lutsk
- Coordinates: 51°22′25″N 25°28′40″E
- Area: 2,976 hectares (7,354 acres; 30 km^{2}; 11 sq mi)
- Established: 2001
- Governing body: State Forestry Committee of Ukraine

Cheremske Nature Reserve (Ukrainian: Черемський природний заповідник) is a protected nature reserve of Ukraine that covers forest and wetlands of the Western Polesia region, in the northwest of the country. The area is one of high biodiversity because of the varied habitat in transitional ecological zones. The reserve is in the administrative district of Manevychi in Volyn Oblast.

== Topography ==
The terrain is flat and boggy, with fluvial deposits of the Ice Age. In places the peat is 10 meters thick.

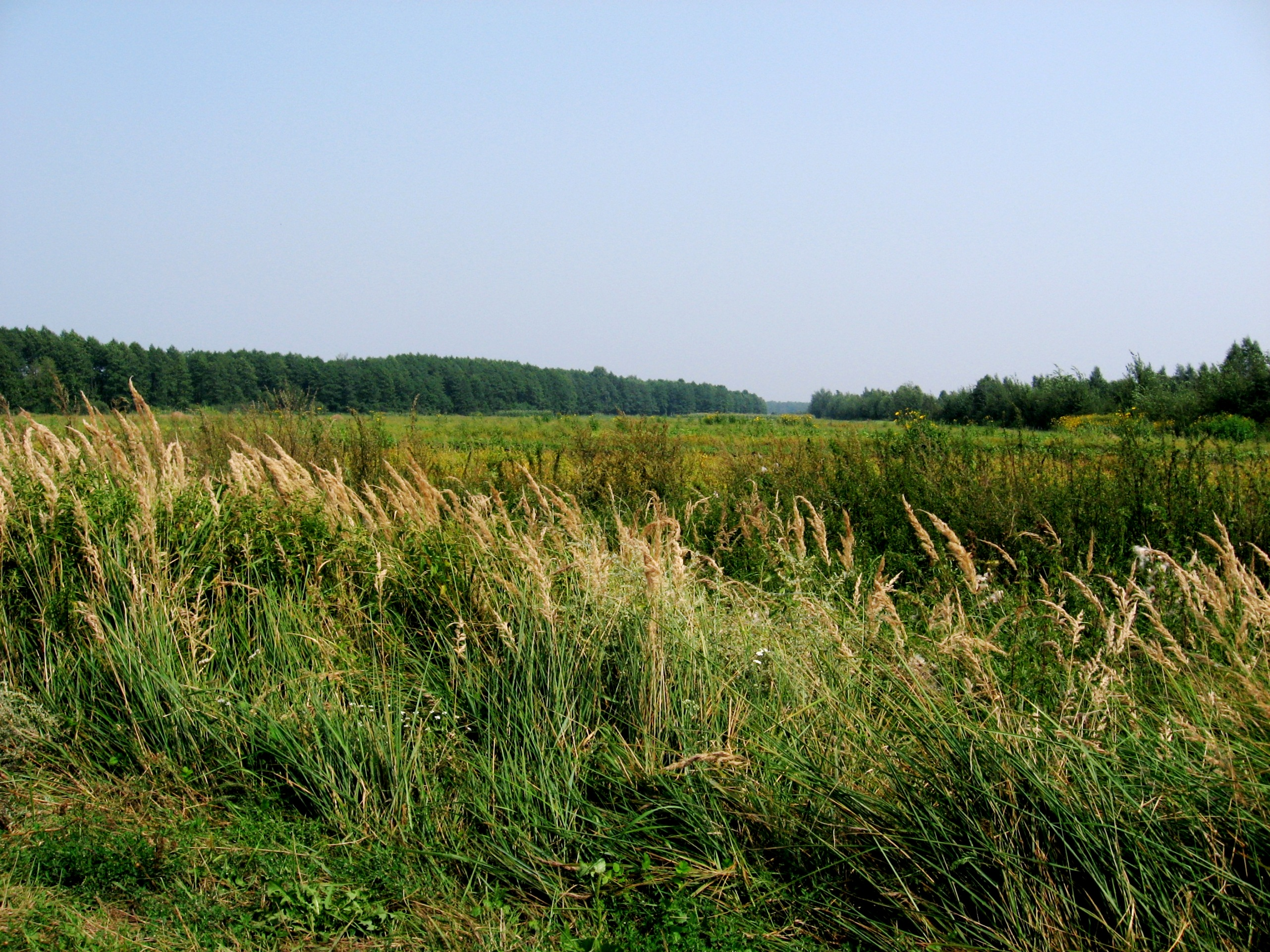
Forest and bog in the reserve

== Climate and ecoregion ==
The climate of Cheremske is Humid continental climate, warm summer (Köppen climate classification (Dfb)). This climate is characterized by large seasonal temperature differentials and a warm summer (at least four months averaging over 10 °C (50 °F), but no month averaging over 22 °C (72 °F).

The reserve is located in the Central European mixed forests ecoregion, a temperate hardwood forest covering much of northeastern Europe, from Germany to Russia.

== Flora and fauna ==
The reserve is approximately 65% forested and 35% wetlands. The Cherem transitional sedge-sphagnum bogs is one of the largest and best preserved in Ukraine.

== Public use ==
As a strict nature reserve, Chermeske's primary purpose is protection of nature and scientific study. Public access is limited: mass recreation and construction of facilities is prohibited as are hunting and fishing. There are several "ecological" educational trails for supervised public use.

== See also ==
- Lists of Nature Preserves of Ukraine (class Ia protected areas)
- National Parks of Ukraine (class II protected areas)
