= Yavoriv military training area =

Military facility in Ukraine

Yavoriv military base
- Yavoriv, Lviv Oblast in Ukraine
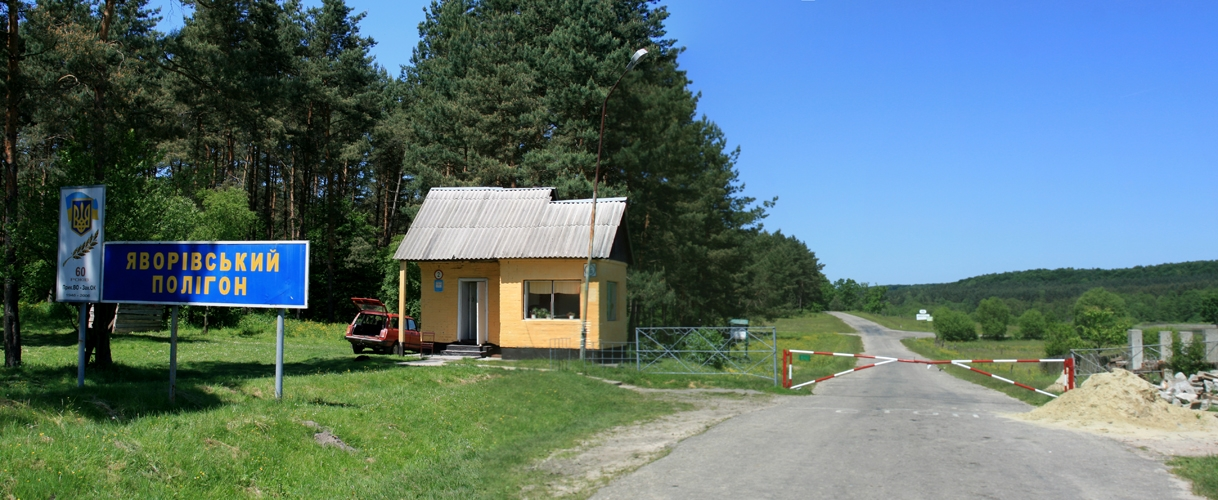
- A checkpoint at the Yavoriv facility

Site information
- Owner: Ministry of Defence (Ukraine)

Location
- Location within Lviv Oblast Location within Ukraine
- Coordinates: 50°00′24.1″N 23°30′02.3″E
- Area: 39,000 hectares (390 km^{2})

Site history
- Battles/wars: 2022 Russian invasion of Ukraine

The International Center for Peacemaking and Security (Ukrainian: Міжнаро́дний центр миротво́рчості та безпе́ки, romanized: Mizhnarodnyi tsentr myrotvorchosti ta bezpeky), also known as the Yavoriv military training area (Я́ворівський військовий поліго́н), (Note: romanized: Yavorivskyi viiskovyi polihon) is a military training area of the Armed Forces of Ukraine in the city of Yavoriv in western Ukraine, some 10 km from the border with Poland and 30 kilometers northwest of Lviv in Yavoriv district. The facility houses an International Center for Peacekeeping and Security within the framework of the Ukraine–NATO Partnership for Peace program and the National Military Academy Hetman Petro Sahaidatschnyj. The base covers an area of around 390 km^{2} (151 sq miles) and can accommodate up to 1,790 people. The course covers an area of 36,153 hectares; until the creation of the Yavoriv National Park, it was 42,000 hectares in size.

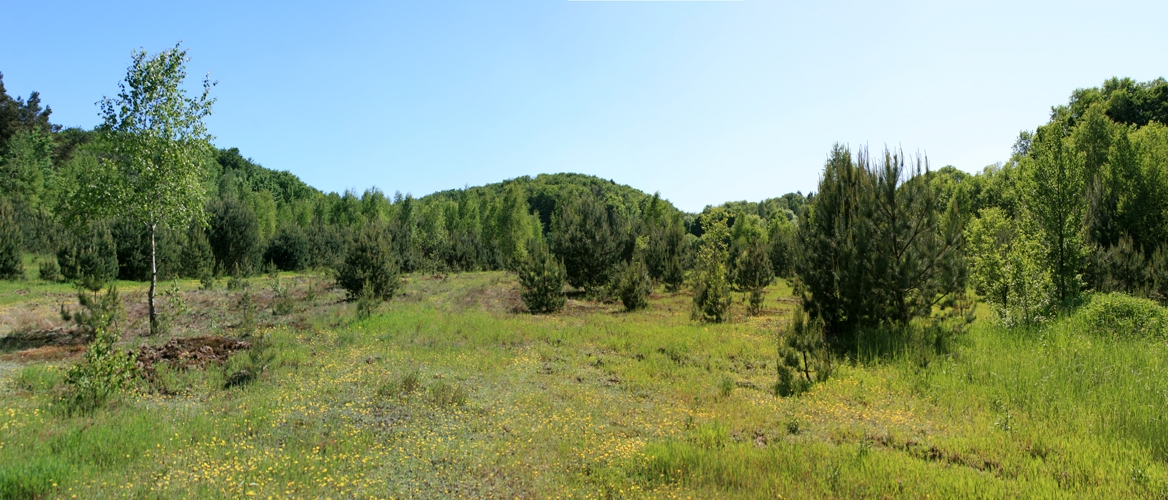
View of the landscape in 2008

== History ==
Modern Yavoriv military training area was founded in 1940. A former military training area, originally established under Austrian rule, and then occupied by the Polish army after their attack on Ukraine, was used. Therefore, this military training area had existed here before the Soviet occupation of eastern Poland in 1939 and the Soviet annexation of western Ukraine. Under Soviet occupation, on February 13, 1940, the USSR passed a resolution on the evacuation of 30 villages, the area of which was needed for the expansion of the square.

A total of 125,000 people were forcibly resettled from the area, and 170 villages and hamlets became deserts. The inhabitants were taken to southern Bessarabia to villages that had recently become free during the evacuation of Bessarabian Germans to the German Reich.

=== German occupation ===
From 1941 to 1944, the area was used by the German Wehrmacht as a military training area in Galicia named Truppenübungsplatz Galizien. Later, the Red Army used the area again and from 1991 the Ukrainian Armed Forces.

=== IPSC ===
The International Peacekeeping and Security Centre (IPSC) was formed in 2007 to aid in the training of personnel from the Ukrainian Armed Forces, particularly for peacekeeping missions. The IPSC also provides training to foreign state military units which provide forces to peacekeeping missions and in the fight against terrorism. In 2016, the JMTC's Fearless Guardian II program trained soldiers in first aid, counter-unmanned aerial vehicle tactics and dealing with counter-IEDs.

In September 2015 NATO's Euro-Atlantic Disaster Response Coordination Centre (EADRCC) and the State Emergency Service of Ukraine (SESU) ran the joint exercise "Ukraine 2015" with more than 1,100 participants, including first responders, search and rescue teams and experts dealing with the fallout from a chemical or nuclear attack.

== Russo-Ukrainian war ==
During the 2022 Russian invasion of Ukraine, the Yavoriv military facility was hit by a Russian missile strike early on 13 March 2022. According to Ukrainian officials, 30 rockets were fired at the base, killing 35 and injuring 134 others. Ukrainian officials also reported that as many as 1000 foreign fighters had been training at the base as part of the Ukrainian Foreign Legion. The Russian Ministry of Defence announced that it had destroyed "up to 180 foreign mercenaries and a large consignment of foreign weapons" and said that Russia would continue attacks on foreign fighters in Ukraine; the Ukrainian Ministry of Defence said that it had not confirmed any foreigners among the dead. On 14 March, British newspaper The Mirror said that at least three British ex-special forces may have been killed in the strikes, with the total amount of dead volunteers potentially surpassing one hundred.

Ukraine's Defence Minister Oleksii Reznikov described the strike as a "terrorist attack on peace and security near the EU-NATO border". A NATO official said that there was no NATO personnel in Ukraine.

In April 2025, the Security Service of Ukraine arrested an instructor at the facility on suspicion of plotting to assassinate base commanders on behalf of the Russian Federal Security Service and the GRU.
