= Meotyda National Nature Park =

National park in Ukraine

- Ukrainian: Меотида національний природний парк
- IUCN category II (national park)
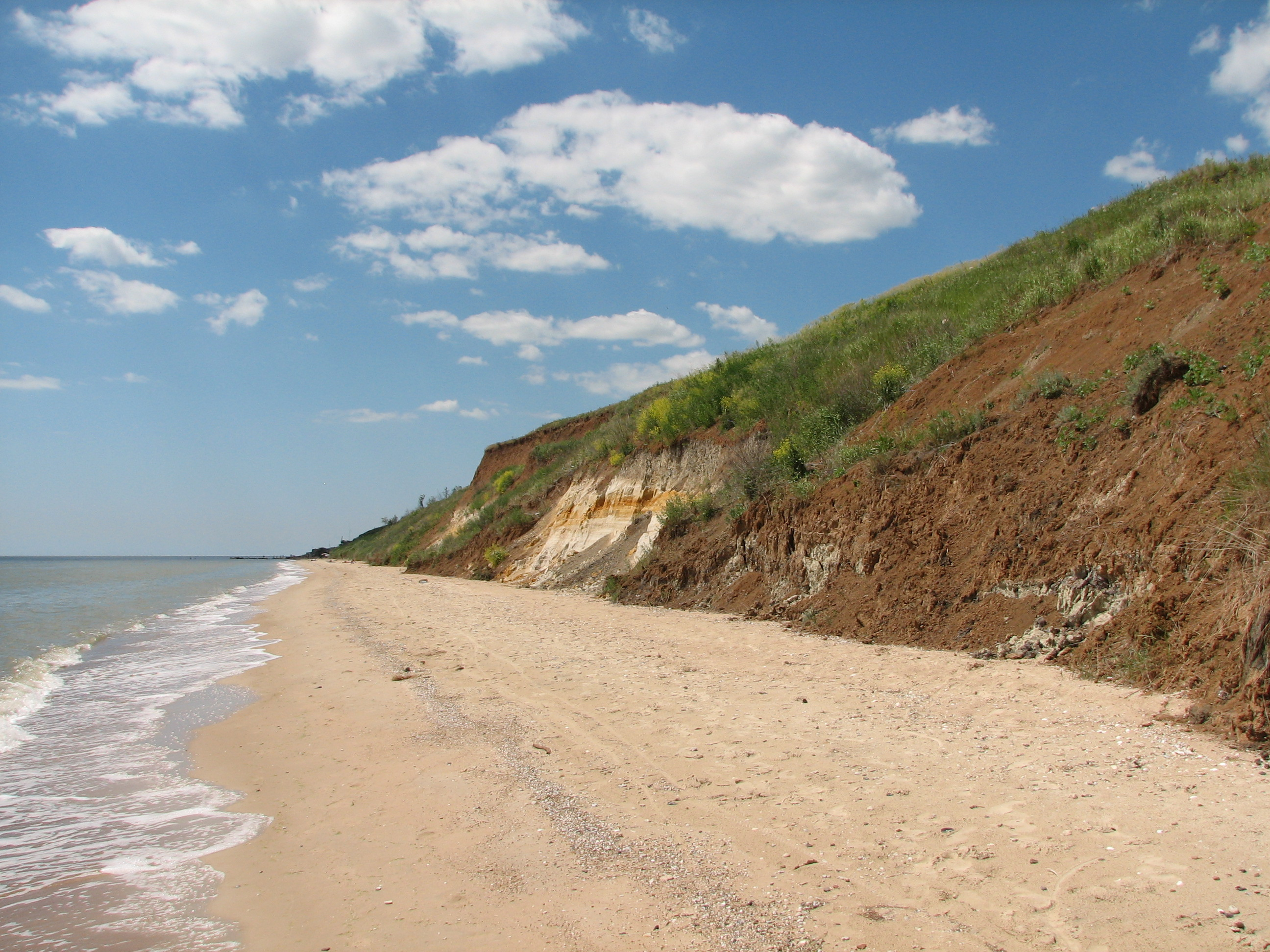
- Meotyda National Park, near Rybatskoye on the coast of the Azov Sea

- Location within Ukraine Location within Donetsk Oblast
- Location: Donetsk Oblast
- Nearest city: Mariupol
- Coordinates: 47°6′53″N 38°4′48″E
- Area: 207,209.531 hectares (512,026 acres; 2,072 km^{2}; 800 sq mi)
- Established: 2009
- Governing body: Ministry of Ecology and Natural Resources (Ukraine)
- Website: http://www.meotida.dn.ua/ [presently inactive]

The Meotyda National Nature Park (Ukrainian: Національний природний парк «Меотида») covers a stretch of coastline, and interior estuaries and coastal lands, on the northern edge of the Sea of Azov in Ukraine. The administration of the park itself has been disrupted by hostilities in the area. Previously, the protected regions of the park supported important populations of migratory waterfowl and over 100 species of nesting birds. The current status of wildlife (as of 2018) depends on the varying levels of military activity in the park. Administratively, the park encompasses several subsidiary nature reserves and state lands, which retain their legal status. The park is named for the Maeotians, an ancient people who lived on the Azov shores; ancient names for the Sea of Azov itself included Lake Maeotis and the Maeotian Sea. The park crosses several administrative districts, including Nikolske Raion, Novoazovsk Raion, and Manhush Raion in Donetsk Oblast

== Topography ==
Meotyda was assembled in 2009 to cover a number of smaller nature reserves, state lands, and cultural monuments along the northern coast of the Sea of Azov, in the southwest corner of Donetsk Oblast. The park is close to the Mariupol, and is about 80 miles south of the regional city of Donetsk and 40 miles west of the border with Russia. The area's habitats themselves show great diversity: steppe, coastal plain, floodplain swamps, estuaries with variable salinity, spits, peninsulas, sandy-shell islands, dunes and saline lakes. The two main coastal sections for birds are the Belosariaiskka Spit in the west, and the Kryva Bay and Kryva Spit in the east.

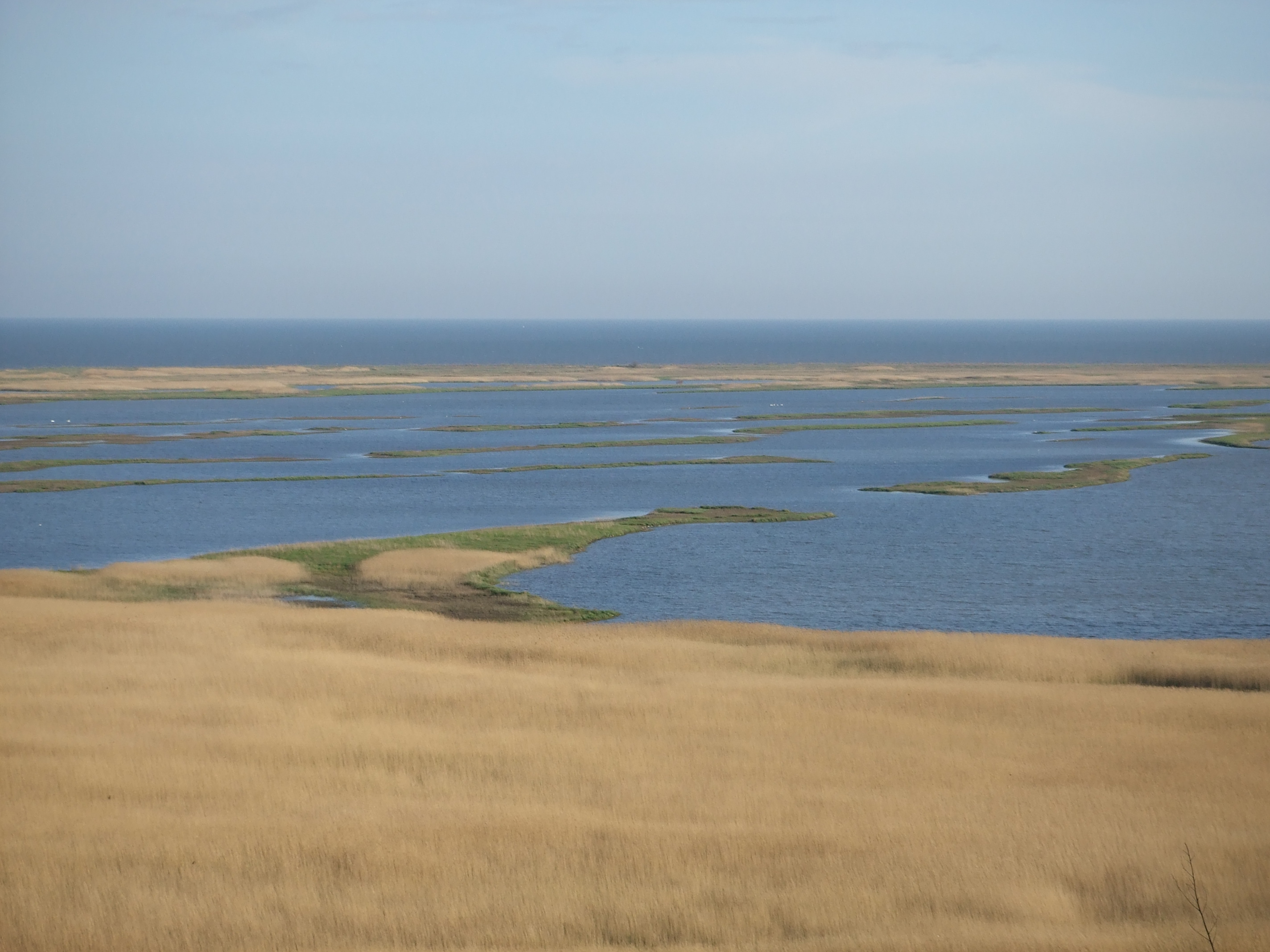
Yelanchansky bakai, in Meotyda NNP

== Climate and ecoregion ==
The climate of Meotyda is Humid continental climate - Hot summer sub-type (Köppen climate classification Dfa), with large seasonal temperature differentials and a hot summer (at least one month averaging over 22 °C (72 °F), and mild winters. In Meotyda, precipitation averages 350 mm/year. The temperature of the water ranges up to an average of 27.5 °C (81.5 °F) in July.

Meotyda is located in the Pontic–Caspian steppe ecoregion, a region that covers an expanse of grasslands stretching from the northern shores of the Black Sea to western Kazakhstan.

== Current status ==
As of 2018, the eastern sections of the park were lost to park administrative control due to separatist fighting in the area. Effects on the vulnerable bird and wildlife populations are unclear. The park's director reported that increased military patrols on the coast of the retained (western) sections have increased security for nesting birds, as it has reduced pressure from people and dogs.

== See also ==
- National Parks of Ukraine
