= Lower Dniester National Nature Park =

National park in Ukraine

- Ukrainian: Нижньодністровський національний природний парк
- IUCN category II (national park)
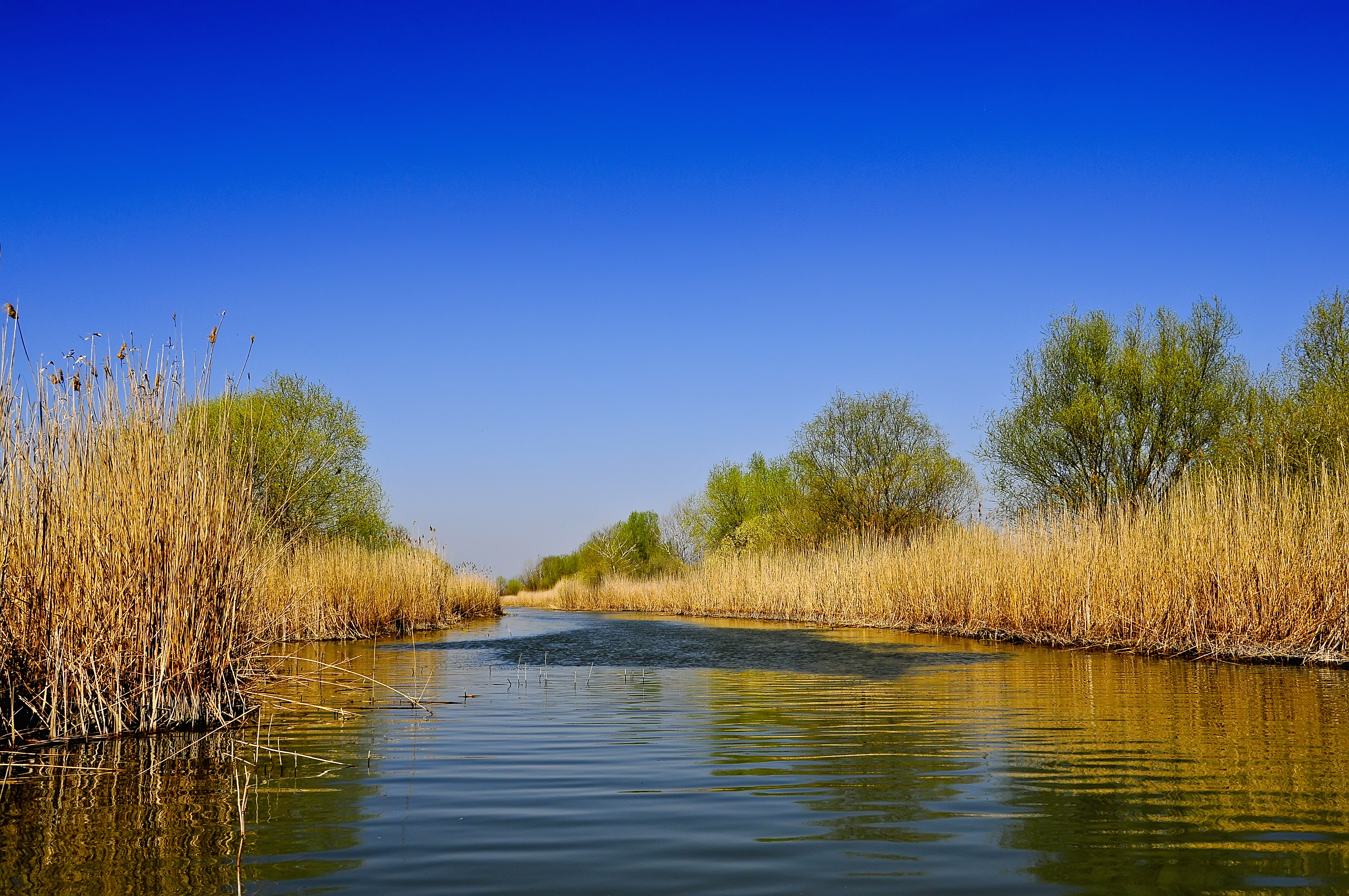
- Lower Dniester National Nature Park

- Location within Ukraine
- Location: Bilhorod-Dnistrovskyi Raion, Odesa Oblast
- Nearest city: Odesa
- Coordinates: 46.4122°N 30.2103°E
- Area: 21,311 hectares (52,661 acres; 213 km^{2}; 82 sq mi)
- Established: 2008
- Governing body: Ministry of Ecology and Natural Resources (Ukraine)
- Website: http://nnpp.org.ua/

The Lower Dniester National Nature Park (Ukrainian: Нижньодністровський національний природний парк) covers a large portion of the Dniester River Estuary where it enters the Black Sea in southwestern Ukraine. The floodplains and waterways are important to nesting and wintering waterfowl. They are also important for spawning fish: over 70 species of fish in 20 groups are recorded in the park. The boundaries include two Ramsar wetland sites of international importance. The park is about 30 km west of the city of Odesa, in Bilhorod-Dnistrovskyi and Odesa Raions in Odesa Oblast.

== Topography ==
The park covers the northern part of the Dniester Liman (estuary), including the confluence of the Dniester River and the Turunchuk River which enters from Moldova to the west. The coastal area is a freshwater lagoon, and the inland areas are permanent inland deltas and intermittent freshwater lakes. As is common with national parks in Ukraine, Lower Dniester is allocated among different zones - nature protection, regulated recreation, stationary recreation, and economic use. The southern part of the park on the Gulf of Karogol is an ichthyological reserve where fishing is prohibited.

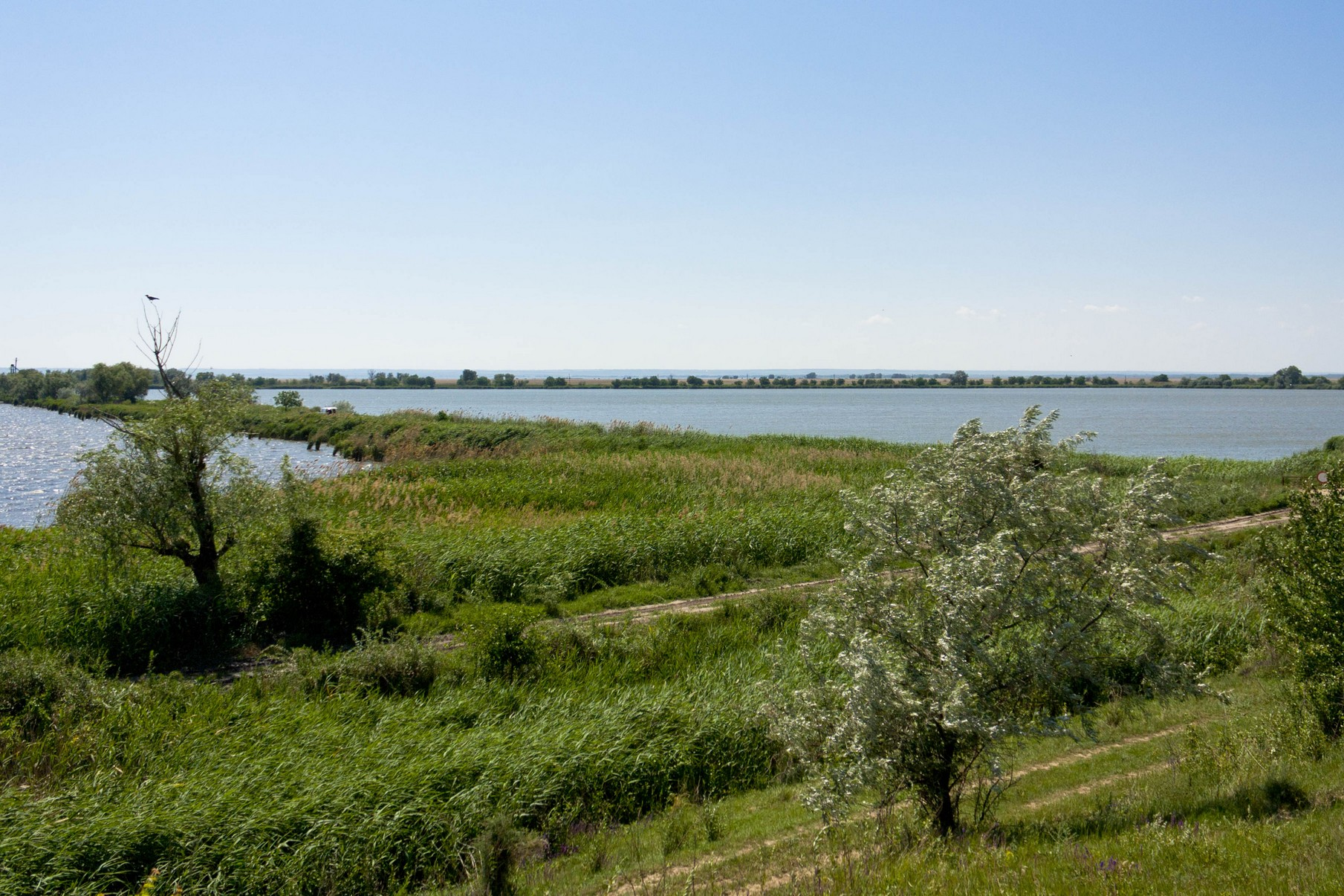
Protected area in Lower Dniester Park

== Climate and ecoregion ==
The climate of Lower Dniester is Humid continental climate, warm summer (Köppen climate classification (Dfb)). This climate is characterized by large swings in temperature, both diurnally and seasonally, with mild summers and cold, snowy winters. Precipitation averages 300–400 millimetres (12–16 in) per year.

Lower Dniester National Park is located in the Pontic–Caspian steppe ecoregion, a region that covers an expanse of grasslands stretching from the northern shores of the Black Sea to western Kazakhstan.

== Flora and fauna ==
The habitats in the park include accumulative peninsulas, reed thickets, scroll ridges, floating bogs, and islands of floodplain forest.

Up to 15,000 nesting pairs of birds have been estimated. The dominant nesting species of waterfowl are the Eurasian coot, great crested grebe, mallard, and black-headed gull.

== Public use ==
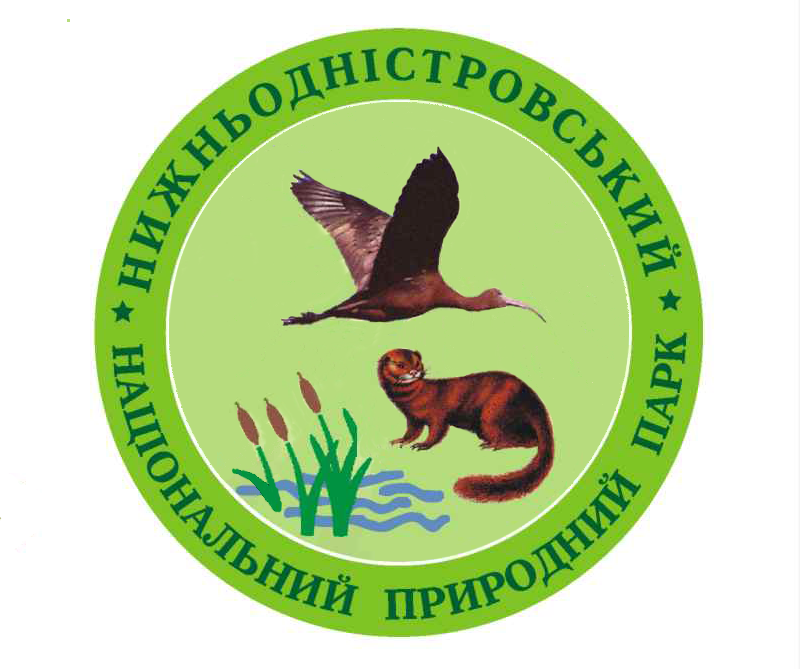
Park logo

There are four major ecotourism routes in the park: (a) "Dniester Amazon", a river route with six observation stops through the Amazon Strait (a picturesque channel in a forest) and the Turunchuk River, (b) "Brilliant Ibis", a course parallel to the first, (c) "Kingdom of the Birds", a 20-km bird-watching excursion through the shallow reaches of the estuary, and (d) "The Trail of Dad Ovsia".

== See also ==
- National Parks of Ukraine
