= Hutsulshchyna National Nature Park =

National park in Ukraine

Coordinates: 48°19′15″N 25°5′33″E

Hutsulshchyna National Park
- IUCN category II (national park)
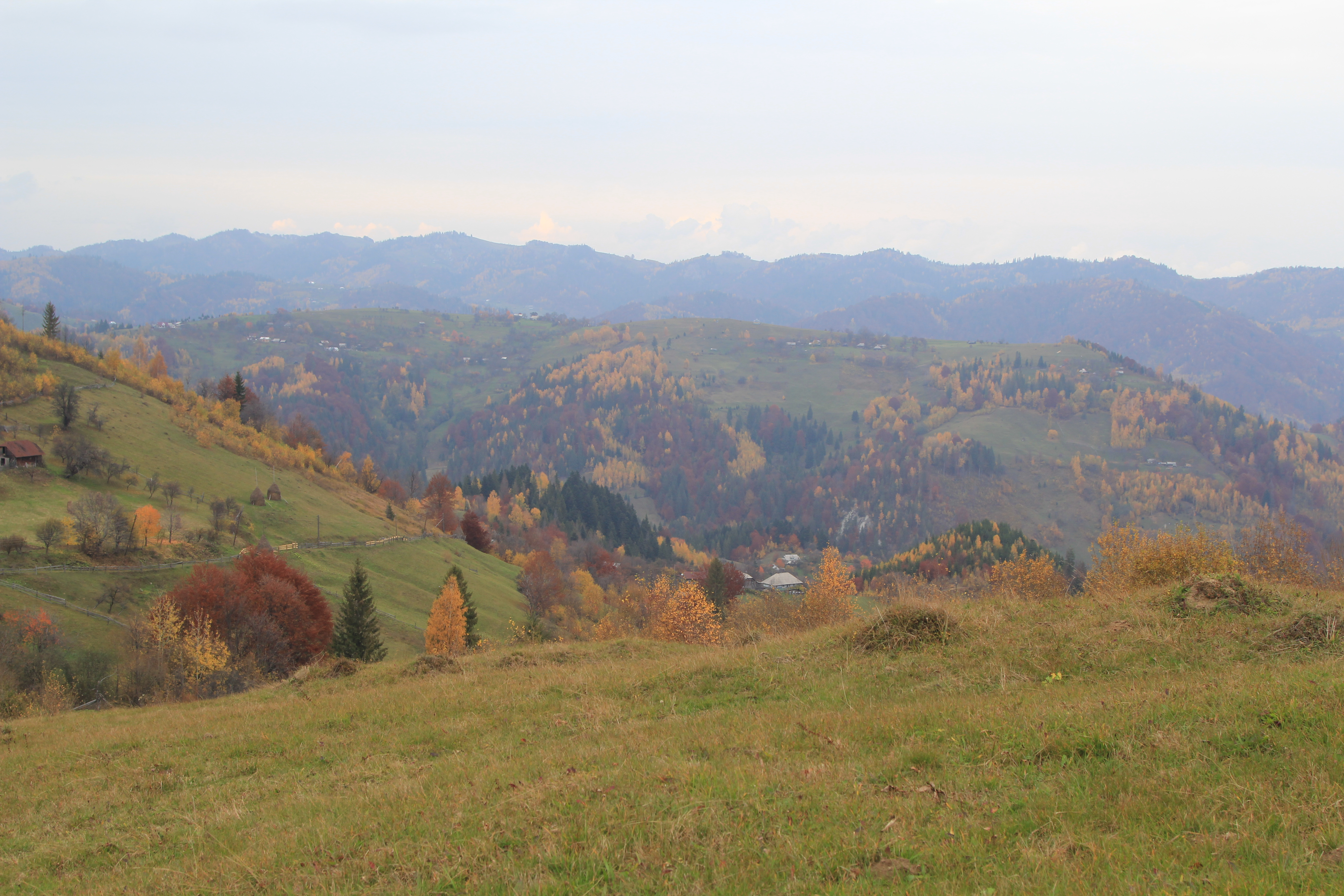

- Location within Ukraine
- Location: Kosiv, Kosiv Raion, Ukraine
- Area: 322 km^{2} (124 sq mi)
- Established: May 14, 2002
- Named for: Named after the region, where NNP is located
- Governing body: Ministry of Natural Environment Protection of Ukraine
- Website: http://nnph.if.ua/

The Hutsulshchyna National Nature Park (Ukrainian: Національний природний парк «Гуцульщина», lit. 'Hutsul Land') is a national park in Ukraine. It is located in the Western Ukraine's Carpathian Mountains. Hutsulshchyna National Park was created on May 14, 2002, and it covers an area of 32,248 hectares. Administratively, it is located in Ivano-Frankivsk Oblast.

== Topography ==
The park is situated on the eastern side of the Carpathians, on both high ranges with altitudes up to 1,472 metres (4,829 ft) on Mt. Gregit, the highest point in the park, and the lower foothills with absolute altitudes of 350–500 metres (1,150–1,640 ft) above sea level. The mountain ridges run in parallel lines from northwest to southeast, with relatively flat tops, steep slopes, and wide basins in between. The Cheremosh River runs along the southern border of the park.

== See also ==
- National parks of Ukraine
- Protected areas of Ukraine
