= Zalissia National Nature Park =

National park in Ukraine

National Nature Park Zalissia
- Ukrainian: Національний природний парк «Залісся»
- IUCN category II (national park)
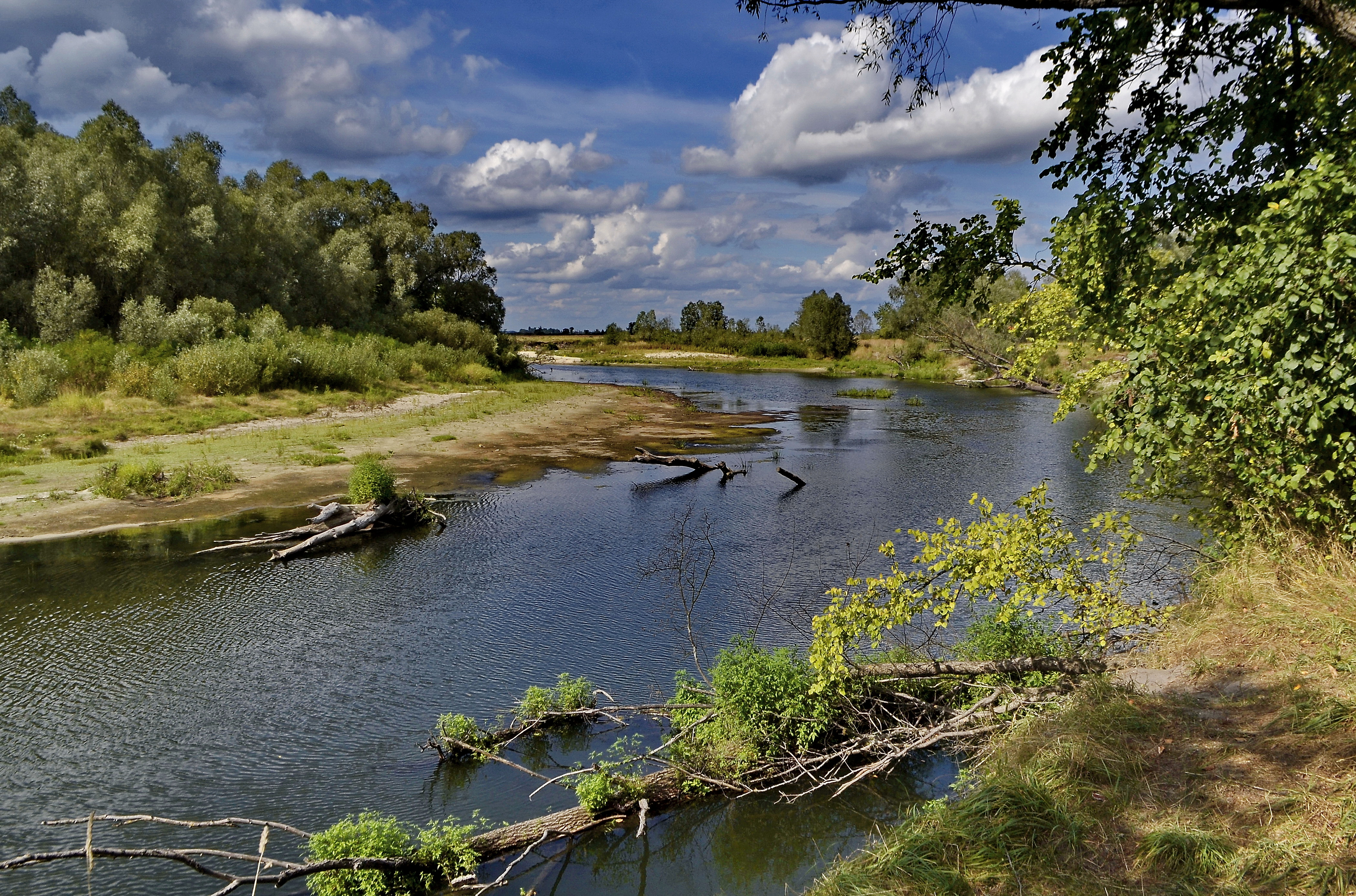
- National Nature Park Zalissia

- Location within Ukraine
- Location: Kyiv Oblast
- Nearest city: Brovary
- Coordinates: 50.67°N 30.85°E
- Area: 14,836 hectares (36,661 acres; 148 km^{2}; 57 sq mi)
- Established: 2009
- Governing body: Ministry of Ecology and Natural Resources (Ukraine)
- Website: http://pryroda.in.ua/kyiv-region/natsionalni-pryrodni-parky/zalissya/

The Zalissia National Nature Park (Ukrainian: Національний природний парк «Залісся», lit. 'Trans-Woodlands') is a state reserve that covers a large forest on the left bank of the Desna River about 20 km northeast of Kyiv. As of 2017, the area is open for limited public access, but is primarily administered as a protected area for the "reception and stay of senior officials", other state uses, and the protection of plant and animal life. A transition to traditional national park status, decreed in 2009, had not been implemented as of 2017. The park is administratively in Brovary Raion of Kyiv Oblast

== History ==
On August 9, 1957, the Zaleske State Forestry was established, based on Semipolkiv and Litkiv forestries of the Kyiv mechanized forestry, in order to provide proper conditions for the reception and stay of senior officials of the state, heads of foreign states and official delegations of foreign states, and international organizations. In 1965, a regime was created close to the reserve, in order to restore, protect and rationally allow the hunting of the fauna on the territory, which led to its reorganization into the Zaleske State Protected Forestry Enterprise (DZLMG). The enterprise existed until around the mid-1990s. During this time, the first protected areas were set up on the territory of the State Forestry Museum, which received the status of reserves of local importance, called Zaleske Swamp, which was established in 1979, and Velykivske Swamp, which was created in 1994.

Zaleske DZLMG didn't lose its functions after Ukraine gained independence. On January 9, 1995, the President of Ukraine, Leonid Kuchma, ordered the creation of the State Enterprise "State Residence "Zalissia". On August 10, 2005, the Head of the State Administration of Affairs ordered that the State Enterprise "State Residence "Zalissia" be reorganized into State Organization (DO) "Residence "Zalissia". Since 2000, the organization has been managed by the State Administration of the President of Ukraine.

On December 11, 2009, Ukrainian President Viktor Yushchenko signed Decree No. 1049 "On the Establishment of the National Nature Park (NPP) "Zalissia". However, some legal conflicts led to the functioning of the object of the nature reserve fund only on paper. The main land user of the park territory remained the DO "Residence "Zalissia". On December 29, 2021, Zalissia received the final registration of the legal status of the national nature park, in response to the active position of the organization's staff and the assistance of the domestic environmentalist community.

In March 2022, during the Russo-Ukrainian war, the Russian armed forces occupied Zalissia National Nature Park and some of the nearby communities for around a month. On March 20, 2022, the Kyiv Regional Military Administration and the Brovary District Military Administration issued orders that prohibited the public from entering or visiting the forests, including Zalissia National Nature Park, in the Brovary district of the Kyiv region, which as of May 2026 is still in effect. The park was hit with heavy artillery and mortar shelling, which destroyed a large part of the park. However, after the Russian military was driven out by the Ukrainian armed forces, it was discovered the herd of European bison had lost all its males in the conflict. To help ensure the bison population in the park survives, the World Wildlife Fund plans to relocate two male bison from the Vinnytsia region west of Kyiv to Zalissia National Nature Park.

== Topography ==
The meandering Desna River runs from north to south along the west border of the park. The channel itself is 5–10 km from the park, while the park is on the first and second terraces. The park is about 10 km wide (west-to-east) and 20 km north-to-south.

== Climate and ecoregion ==
The climate of Zalissia is Humid continental climate, warm summer (Köppen climate classification (Dfb)). This climate is characterized by large seasonal temperature differentials and a warm summer (at least four months averaging over 10 °C (50 °F), but no month averaging over 22 °C (72 °F).

The park is located in the Central European mixed forests ecoregion, a temperate hardwood forest covering much of northeastern Europe, from Germany to Russia.

== Flora and fauna ==
Pine trees are most common, at 85% of the forested area. Oak trees cover 7%, alder 5%, and other species 3%. An estimated 1,700 hectares of pine forest is over 100 years old.

== Public use ==
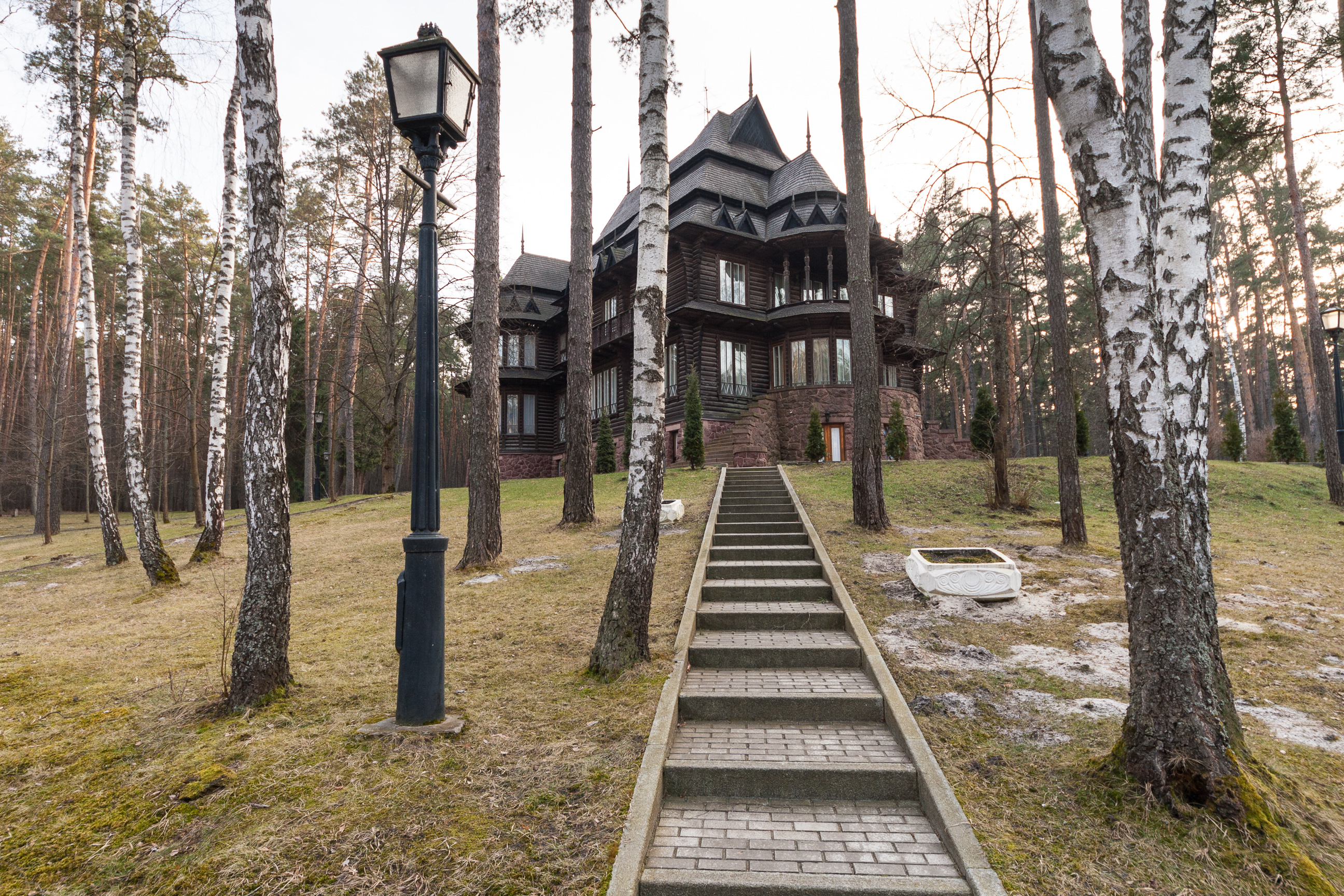
Residence Zalissia, on the territory of the park

As of 2017, the park was still primarily administered for state purposes, and no timetable had been set for transition to a traditional national park. The territory is administered by Ukraine's State Administration of Affairs for the "provision of proper conditions for the reception and stay of senior officials of the state, heads of foreign states and official delegations of foreign states, international organizations", and also for the protection of plant and animal life. The 'Residence Zalissia' on the site is open to the public, and ecological excursions, horseback riding, bird-watching visits and similar recreation can be pre-arranged with forestry department officials.

== See also ==
- National Parks of Ukraine
