= Halych National Nature Park =

National park in Ukraine

- Ukrainian: Галицький національний природний парк
- IUCN category II (national park)
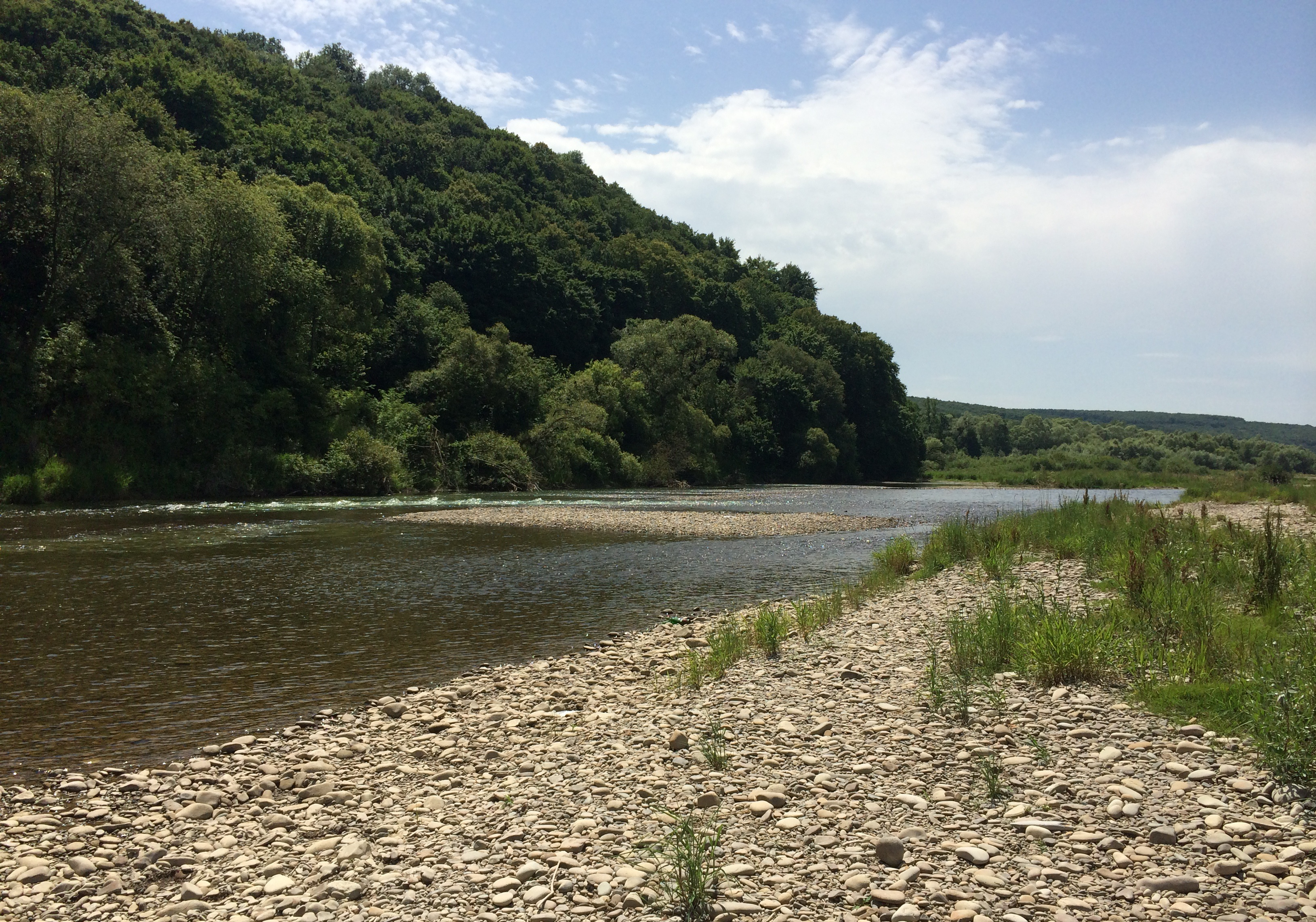
- Limnytsia River in Halych National Nature Park

- Location within Ukraine
- Location: Ivano-Frankivsk Raion, Ivano-Frankivsk Oblast
- Nearest city: Ivano-Frankivsk
- Coordinates: 49.1394°N 24.7317°E
- Area: 14,685 hectares (36,287 acres; 147 km^{2}; 57 sq mi)
- Established: 2004
- Governing body: Ministry of Ecology and Natural Resources (Ukraine)
- Website: http://www.halychpark.if.ua/

The Halych National Nature Park (Ukrainian: Галицький національний природний парк) highlights forest, steppe, meadow, and wetlands of the borderlands between the Ukrainian Carpathians and the southwestern part of the East European Plain. The national park lies in the administrative district of Ivano-Frankivsk Raion in Ivano-Frankivsk Oblast in western Ukraine.

== Topography ==
The park is situated in the foothills of the northern slope of the Carpathian Mountains. The park's territory is a patchwork of 16 tracts along the Dniester River, and up into the hills along several large tributary rivers.

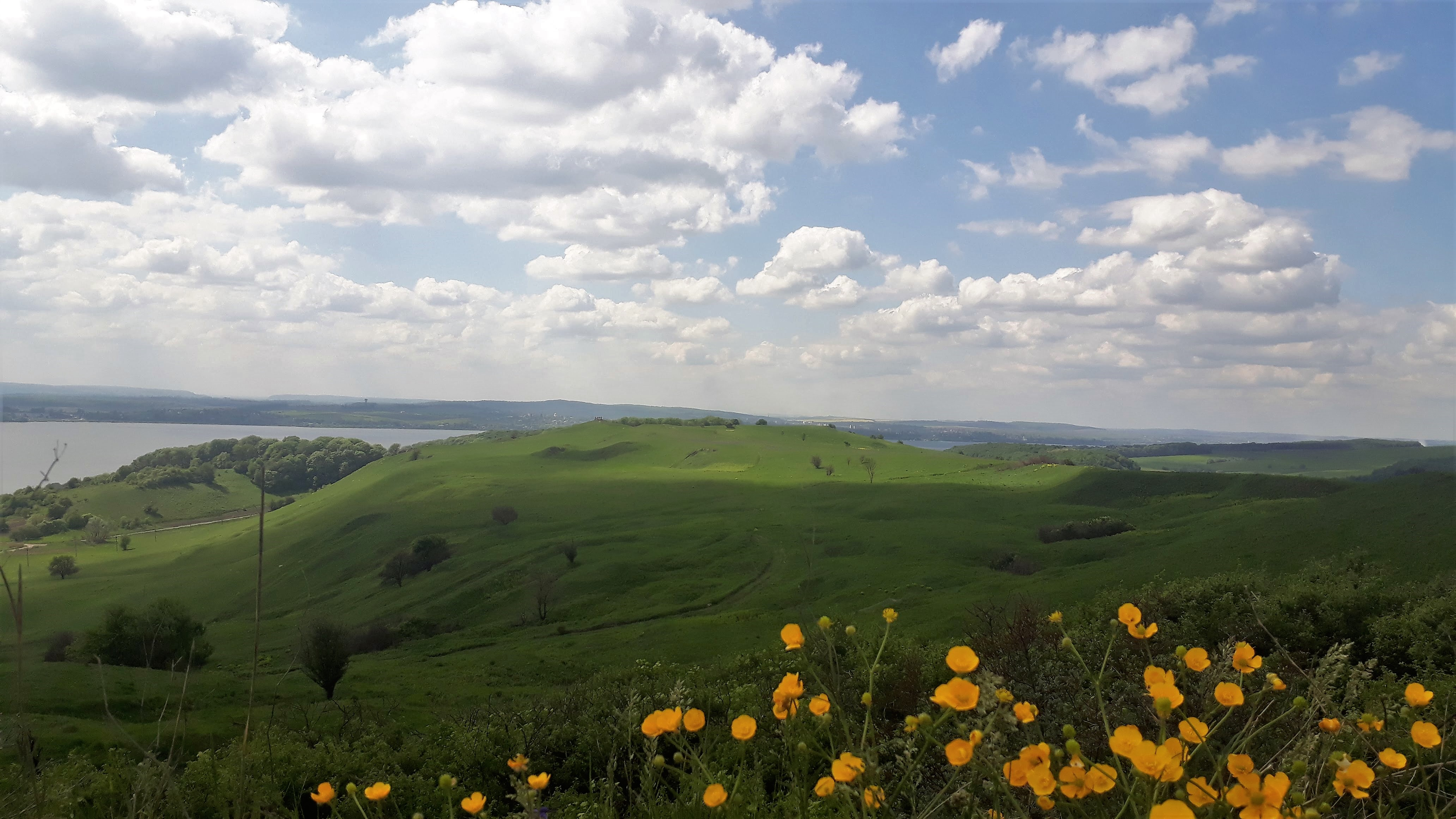
View from Cash Mountain in the park

== Climate and ecoregion ==
The official climate designation for the Halych area is "Humid continental climate – warm summer subtype" (Köppen climate classification Dfb), with large seasonal temperature differentials and a warm summer (at least four months averaging over 10 °C (50 °F), but no month averaging over 22 °C (72 °F). The average temperature in January is −4 °C (25 °F), and in July is 18 °C (64 °F). Annual rainfall is 600–800 millimetres (24–31 in), with 70% falling in the warm months.

== Flora and fauna ==
Halych NNP is on the border of two important ecoregions – the Central European mixed forests ecoregion and the Carpathian montane forests ecoregion. Because of the mixing of flora and fauna in such a transition zone, the park exhibits great biodiversity. About 70% of the park is forested, and an additional 15% is wetland. The forest cover is primarily oak-hornbeam and oak-beech.

== Public use ==
The park features extensive trails for hiking and ecological education. There is a nature museum on the grounds ('The Nature of Galician Earth') in Halych (Galicia-Gora 1). It has 199 exhibits, including dioramas of local habitats, and displays of over 180 animals. The park also sponsors an animals rescue center to care for sick or injured wildlife, which the public may visit. There is a small fee for entry to the park, and for use of trails and selected attractions.

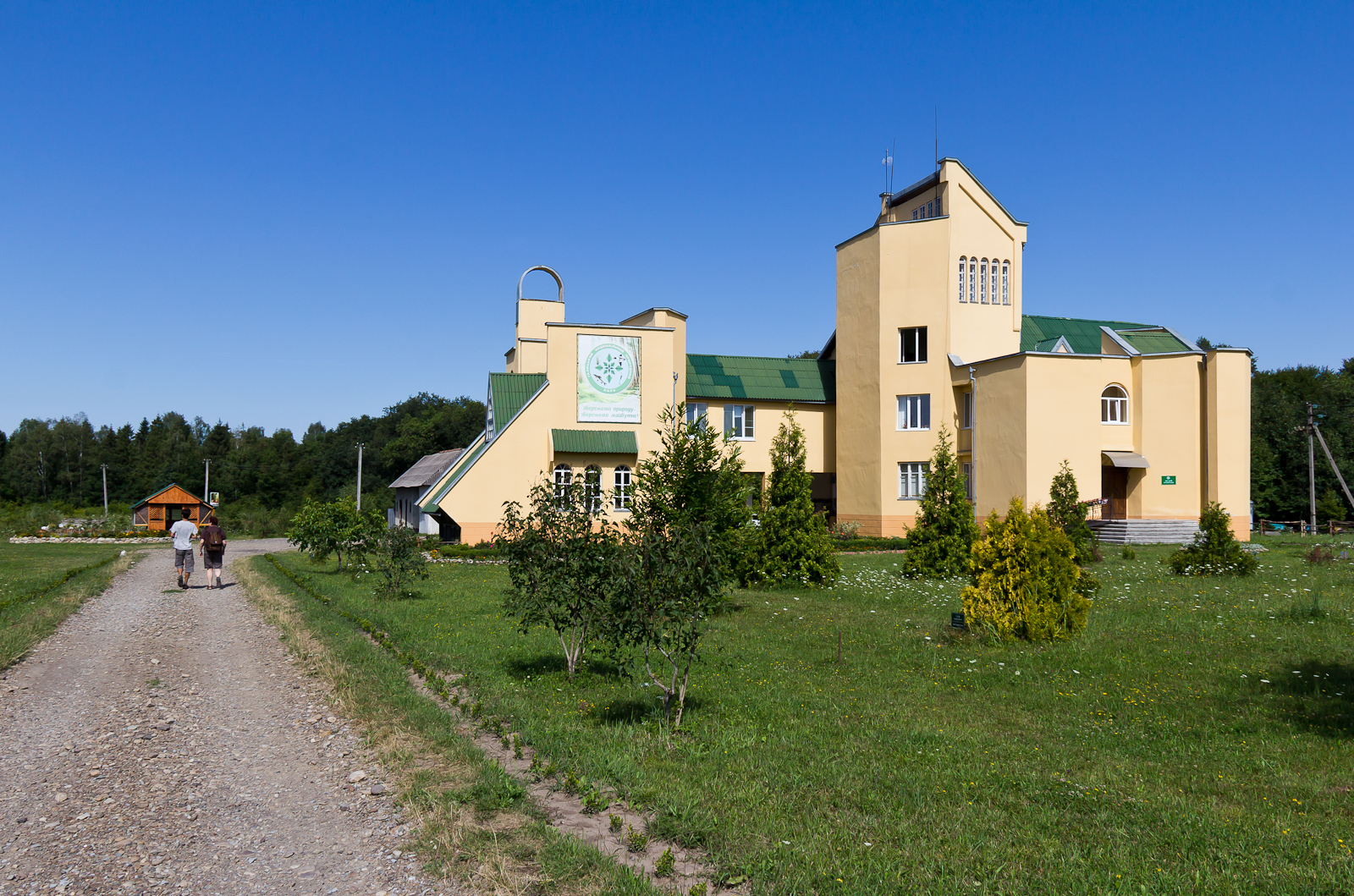
Museum in Halych National Park

== See also ==
- National Parks of Ukraine
