= Kremenets Mountains =

Hill range in western Ukraine

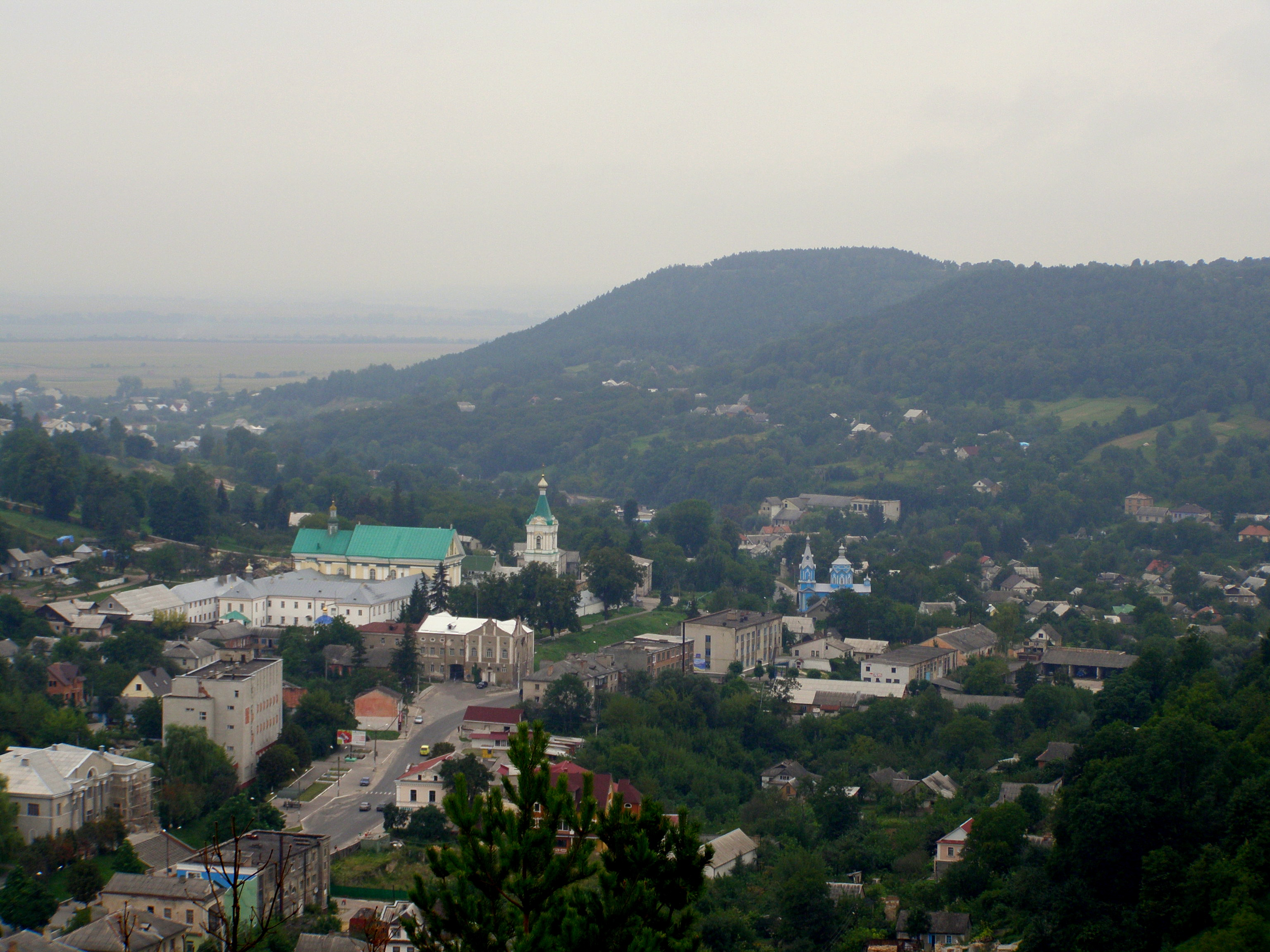
- Kremenets Mountains

Highest point
- Peak: Drabanykha

Dimensions
- Length: 65 km (40 mi)

Geography
- Country: Ukraine
- Range coordinates: 50°7′34″N 25°47′49″E
- Parent range: Holohoro-Kremenets ridge (Podolian Upland)

Kremenets Mountains (Ukrainian: Кременецькі гори; Polish: Góry Krzemienieckie) is a hill range in Volhynia in western Ukraine, being the extension to east of Voroniaky.

They are the northern border of Podolia Upland. The average height is around 300–400 m (1200 ft). The highest point is Drabanykha (409 m/1342 ft).
