= Upper Pobuzhzhia National Nature Park =

Planned national park in Ukraine

- Національний парк «Верхнє Побужжя»
- IUCN category II (national park)
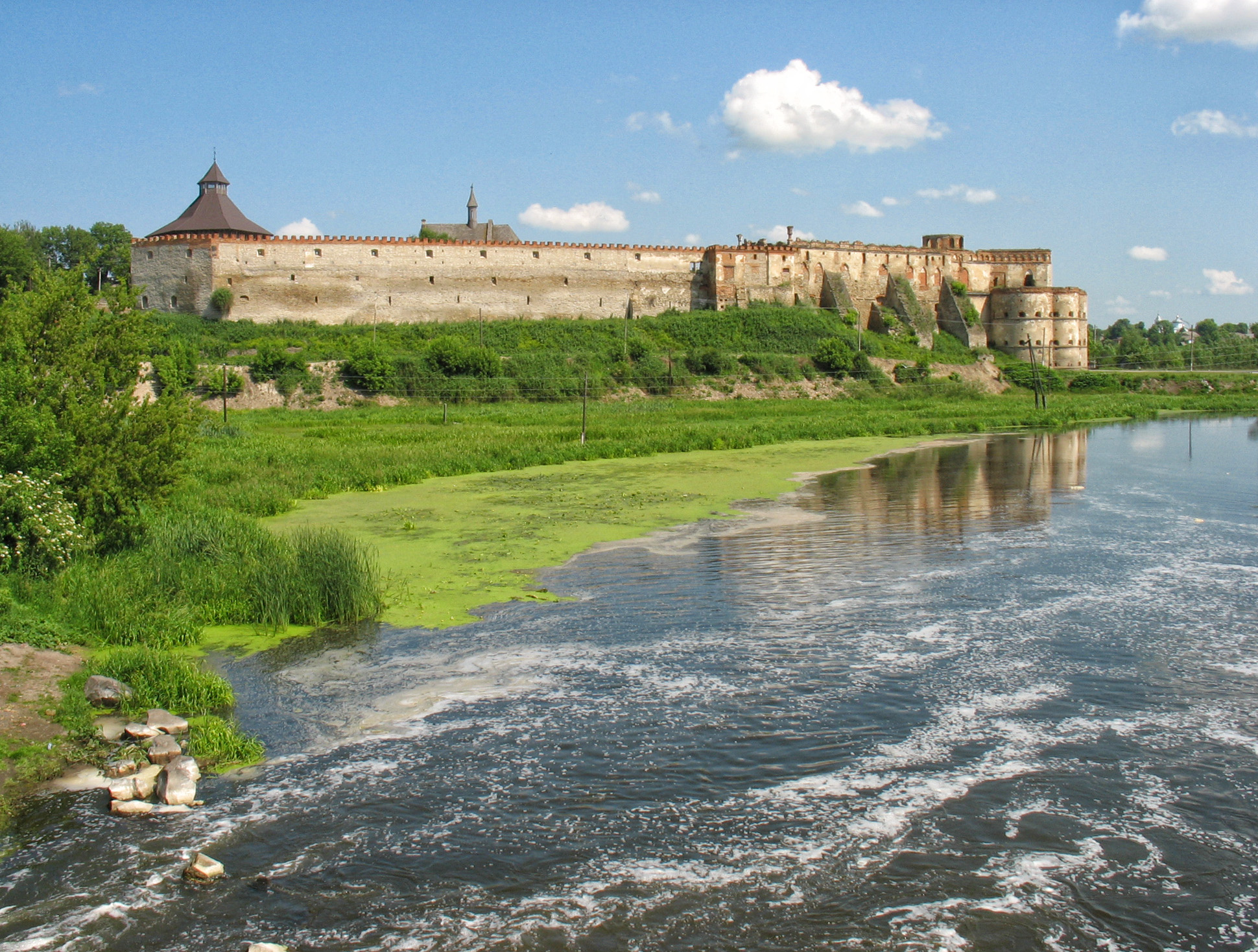
- Medzhybizh Fortress

- Location within Ukraine
- Location: Khmelnytskyi Oblast, Ukraine
- Nearest city: Khmelnytskyi
- Coordinates: 49°26′11″N 27°25′7″E
- Area: 108,000 hectares (1,080 km^{2})
- Established: 2013

The Upper Pobuzhzhia National Nature Park (Ukrainian: Національний природний парк «Верхнє Побужжя», lit. ''Upper Circum-Bug Lands'') is a planned national park in Ukraine, located in Khmelnytskyi Oblast, in the western part of the country. As of 2015, the park, covering an area of 108,000 hectares (1,080 km^{2}), was projected to be open by 2021.

Upper Pobuzhzhia is located in the upper part of the Southern Bug watershed. The proposed park contains a variety of flora and fauna, including 19 plant species listed in the Red Book of Ukraine, 37 regional rare species and 17 animal species found in the European Red List.

== Links ==
- Біорізноманітна Україна
- На Хмельниччині замислилися над створенням нацпарку «Верхнє Побужжя»
- На Хмельниччині встановлюють межі нового національного природного парку
