= Khotyn National Nature Park =

National park in Ukraine

- Ukrainian: Хотинський національний природний парк
- IUCN category II (national park)
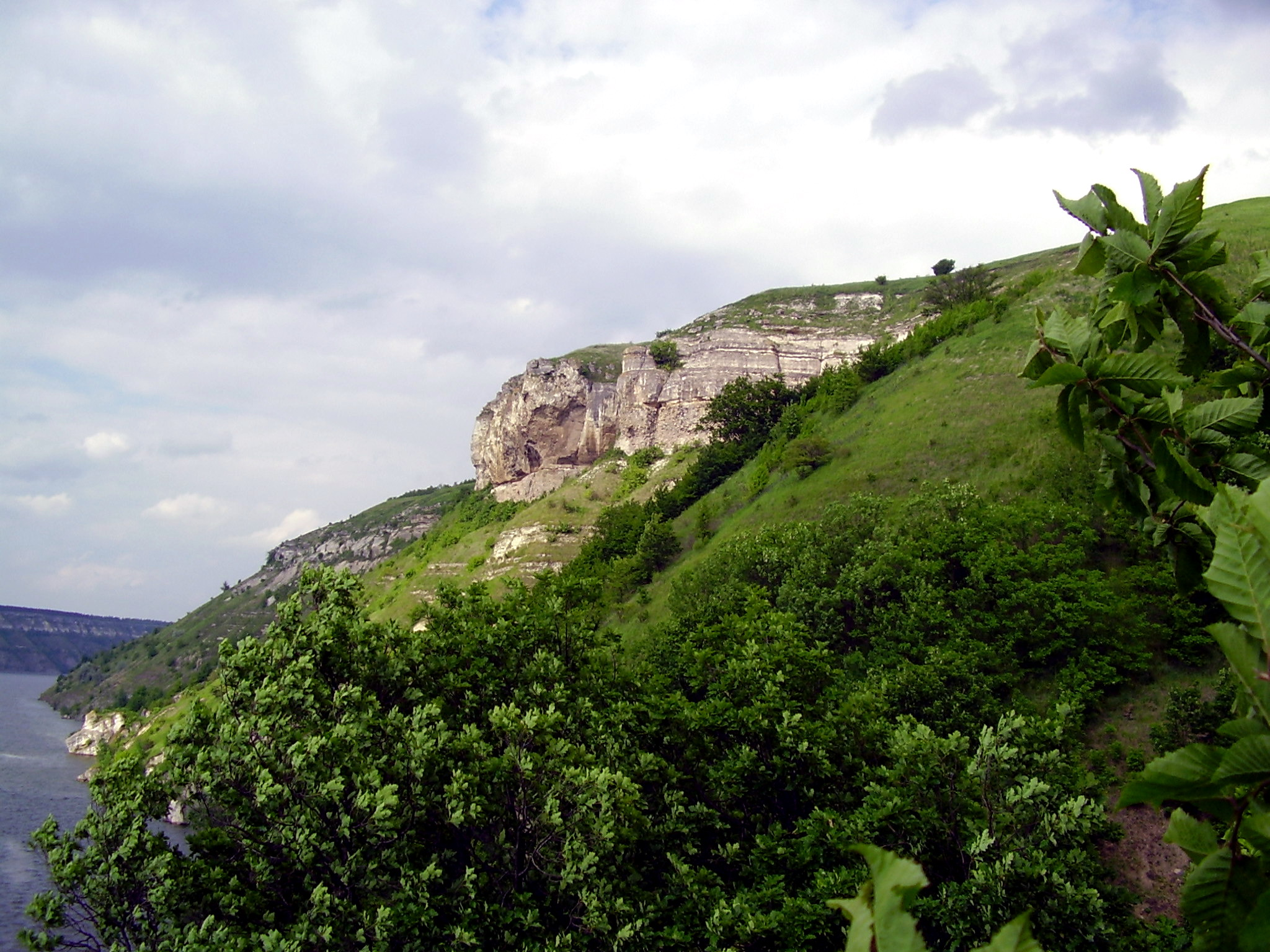
- View of the Hedgehog's Nose, Khotyn National Nature Park

- Location within Ukraine
- Location: Dniester Raion, Chernivtsi Oblast
- Nearest city: Khotyn
- Coordinates: 48.5°N 26.16666667°E
- Area: 9,400 hectares (23,228 acres; 94 km^{2}; 36 sq mi)
- Established: 2010
- Governing body: Ministry of Ecology and Natural Resources (Ukraine)
- Website: Official site:

The Khotyn National Nature Park (Ukrainian: Хотинський національний природний парк) is a national park of Ukraine that covers a segment of the Dniester River Canyon and the Dniester River Reservoir. It is located in the west of the country on the border with Romania. The famous Khotyn Fortress State Historical and Architectural Reserve is located adjacent to the territory of the Khotyn National Nature Park. The park is administratively in Dniester Raion of Chernivtsi Oblast.

== Topography ==
The park stretches for 160 km along the Dniester River. The geology of the Dniester Canyon, cut into the surrounding plateau, includes granite and gneisses up to 2,000 million years old, as well as sedimentary and limestone rocks of the more recent Cenozoic (10–12 million years). The karst landscape in places supports numerous caves.

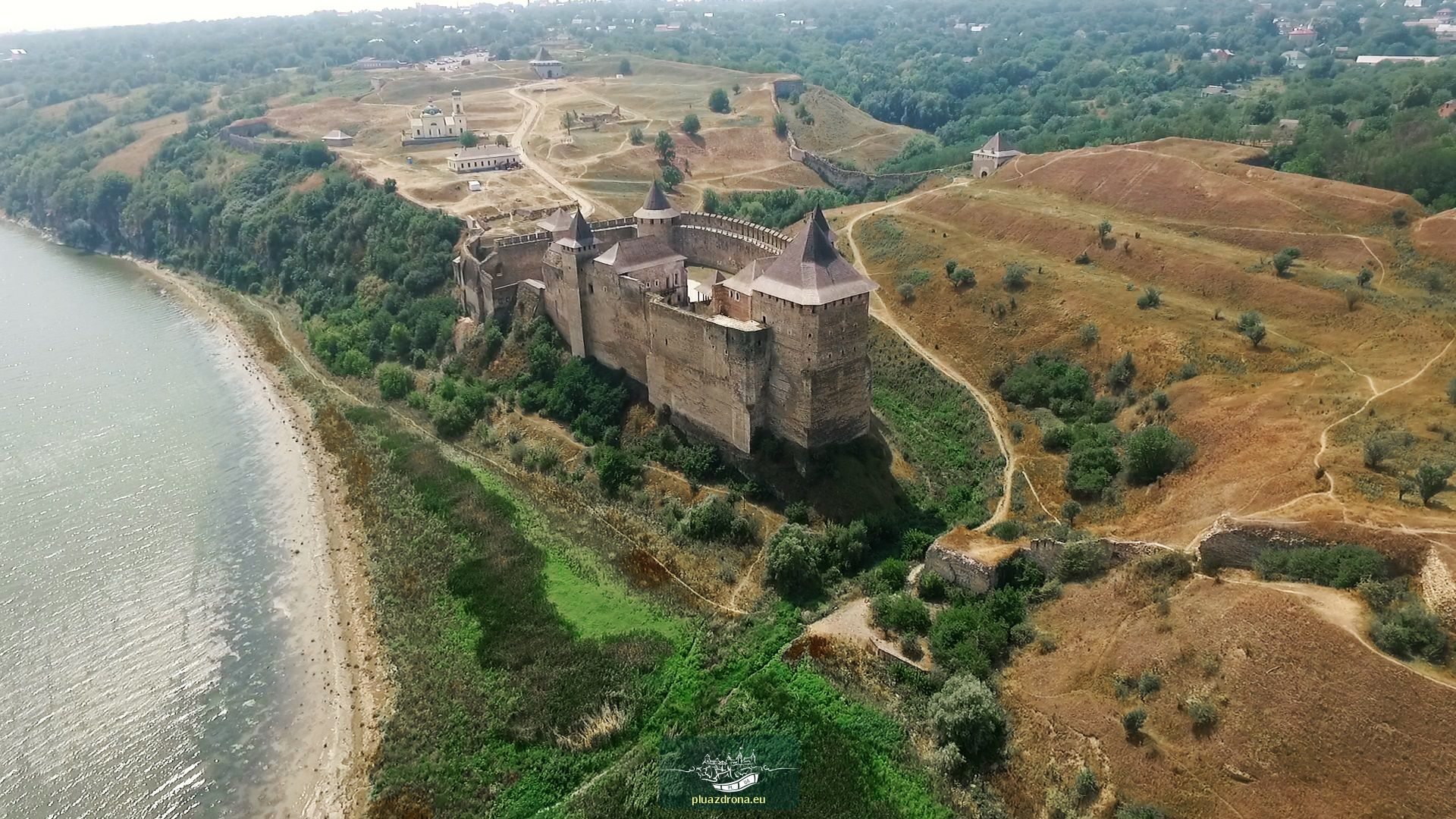
Khotyn Fortress next to the park, which envelops the river Dniester and its banks

== Climate and ecoregion ==
The climate of Khotyn is Humid continental climate, warm summer (Köppen climate classification (Dfb)). This climate is characterized by large swings in temperature, both diurnally and seasonally, with mild summers and cold, snowy winters.

== Flora and fauna ==
Because of the variety of terrain, habitat, and micro-climates in the park, plant and animal diversity is very high. Over 1,500 species of vascular plants have been recorded in the area, 57 species of fish, 187 species of birds, and 40 of mammals.

== Public use ==
Besides the Khotyn Fortress, there are a wide variety of archaeological and cultural sites in the park. Several developed excursion routes are available for hiking and ecological study.

== See also ==
- National Parks of Ukraine
