= Lower Polissia National Nature Park =

National park in Ukraine

- Національний парк «Мале Полісся»
- IUCN category II (national park)
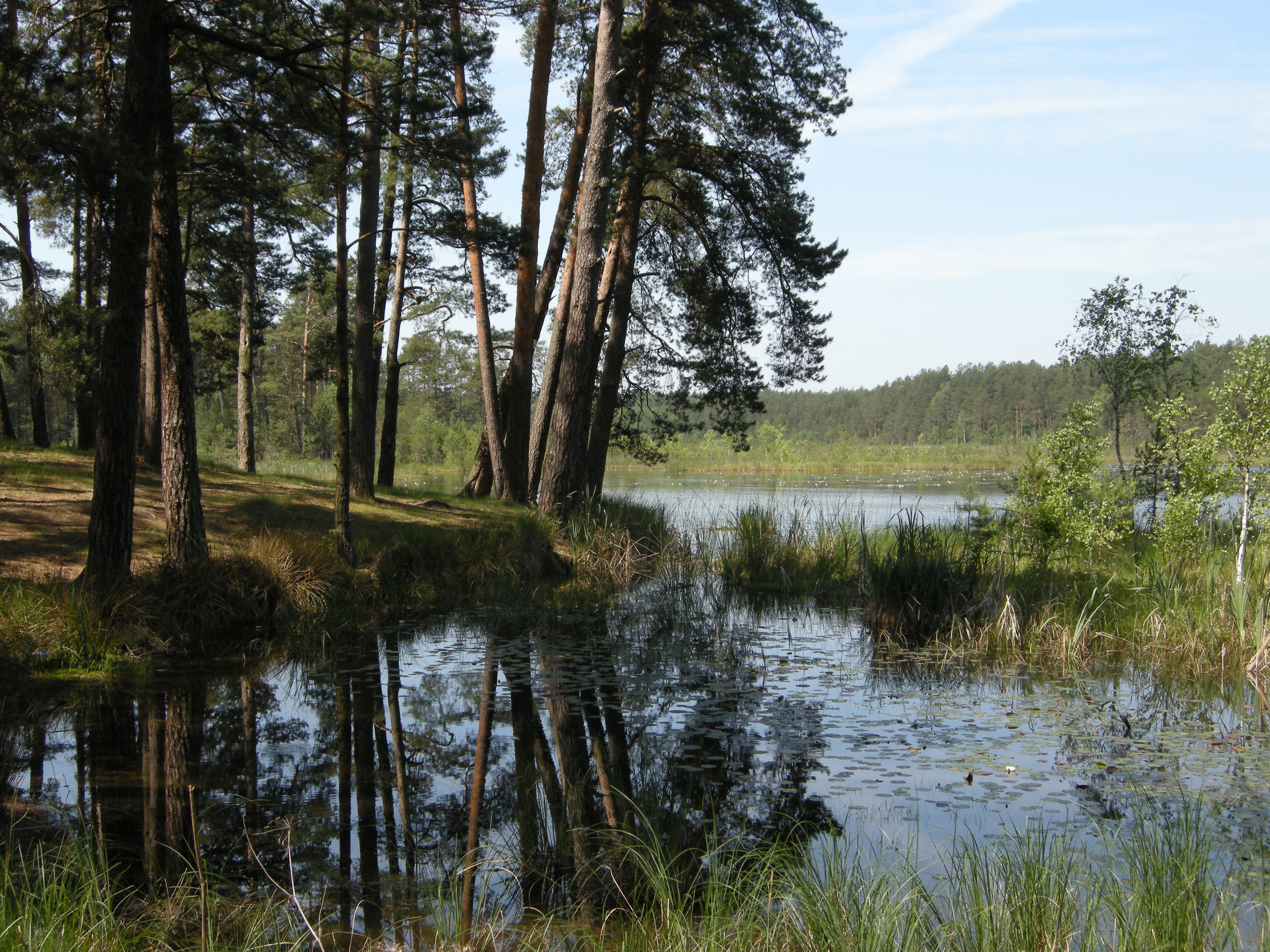

- Location within Ukraine
- Location: Khmelnytskyi Oblast, Ukraine
- Nearest city: Slavuta
- Coordinates: 50°13′4″N 26°50′13″E
- Area: 8,762 hectares (87.62 km^{2})
- Established: 2013
- Website: http://malepolisja.in.ua/

The Lower Polissia National Park (Ukrainian: Національний природний парк «Мале Полісся», romanized: 'Male Polissia') is a national park in Khmelnytskyi Oblast, Ukraine, created in 2013. The park is an 8,762 hectares (87.62 km^{2}) section of Polissia region and includes several lakes and wetland areas as well as parts of river valleys Horyn, Viliia, Hnylyi Rih.

== History ==
For the first time, the creation of the Small Polissia National Nature Park was mentioned in the Decree of the President of Ukraine “On Expanding the Network and Territories of National Nature Parks and Other Nature Reserves” of December 1, 2008. The next stage in the creation of the park was the order of the Head of the Khmelnytsky Regional State Administration of June 16, 2011, “On Approval of the Creation of the Small Polissia National Nature Park”, which marked the beginning of the development and approval of the project for the creation of the Small Polissia National Nature Park by various agencies.

== Flora and fauna ==
The Lower Polissia is a haven for birds, there are 186 species of them, including those unique for the area. Mammals are represented by around 33 species, among them 4 species of European Red List (Alburnoides bipunctatus, Crucian carp, white-tailed eagle, black kite) and 101 species of Annex 2 of the Berne Convention, 11 species listed in the Red Book of Ukraine, including: badger, gray crane, river otter. The Park’s waters feature 18 species of fish, as well as amphibians.
