= National parks of Ukraine =

Map

National nature parks of Ukraine are preservation territories that are part of the Nature-Preservation Fund of Ukraine. The total area protected by national parks is approximately 1,111,600 hectares (11,116 km^{2}), for an average of 22,685 hectares (226.85 km^{2}) but a median of only 14,836 hectares (148.36 km^{2}) at Zalissia. The largest national park is Podilski Tovtry in Khmelnytskyi Oblast at 80,178 hectares (801.78 km^{2}) and the smallest park is Derman–Ostroh National Nature Park, at less than 5,500 hectares (55 km^{2}).

This category of the Nature-Preservation Fund was mainly established after the fall of the Soviet Union. There were very few parks in Ukraine and most of them were in the West.

== List ==
List of National Parks of Ukraine
Name	Ukrainian name	Photo	Area	Location	Year (Note: Year park officially established.)	Description	Refs.
Azov–Syvash	Азово-Сиваський		52154	Kherson Oblast	1993	Located on Byriuchyi Island in the northwestern Azov Sea. The park was created to protect the unique coastal environment of the northwestern Azov. It is particularly important as a stop on the flyway for migratory birds, with over a million birds visiting each year.	
Bile Ozero	Білоозерський		7014	Kyiv Oblast	2009	As of 2014, the park appeared to be closed to the public and the legal status unclear.	
Boikivshchyna	Бойківщина		12240	Lviv Oblast	2019	Located in the Carpathians, near the border with Slovakia.	
Bug Gard	Бузький Гард		6138	Mykolaiv Oblast	2009	Covers an area along the Southern Bug River in south-central Ukraine. At this point, the Southern Bug River cuts through the southern edge of the Ukrainian Shield (a block of Archean basement rock).	
Carpathian	Карпатський		50303	Ivano-Frankivsk Oblast	1980	Carpathian National Nature Park is the first national park of Ukraine and one of the biggest national parks of this country.	
Charming Harbor	Чарівна гавань		6270	Crimea	2009	Covers a coastal sector of the Tarkhankut Peninsula (itself a part of the Crimean peninsula) on the Black Sea. The park protects and exhibits steppe landscape as it descends to the seacoast in a semi-arid environment and with dramatic cliffs and rock formations.	
Cheremosh	Черемоський		7118	Chernivtsi Oblast	2009	A collection of three reserves in the northeastern section of the Carpathian Mountains, located in southwestern Ukraine. The park highlights the highly varied geology of the northeastern Carpathians, as well as the deep spruce forests of the region.	
Chornyi Lis	Чорний Ліс		13,710	Kirovohrad Oblast	2026	See Chornyi Lis	
Derman–Ostroh	Дермансько-Острозький		1648	Rivne Oblast	2009	Sits in a river valley that separates the southern edge of the Polesian Lowland, and the northern edge of the Podolian Upland in northwestern Ukraine. The terrain is a mixture of pine-oak forest and marshy river lowlands.	
Desna–Stara Huta	Деснянсько-Старогутський		16215	Sumy Oblast	1999	Covers a middle section of the Desna River in northeastern Ukraine, representing the variety of wetland and mixed forest landscapes of the eastern Polesia region. The park contains two sections, one on the floodplains of the Desna, the other in the southern region of the Bryansk forest on the Russian border.	
Dniester Canyon	Дністровський каньйон		10830	Ternopil Oblast	2010	Follows Dniester Canyon, the largest canyon in Ukraine, along the middle course of the Dniester River. It protects a relatively undeveloped portion of the Ukrainian forest-steppe landscape, about 75 km east of the Carpathian Mountains in western Ukraine. The canyon is known for its varied geological formations, including two of the longest caves in the world.	
Dvorichna	Дворічанський		3132	Kharkiv Oblast	2009	Set on the border of the steppe and forest-steppe on the banks of the river Oskil, in the south-east part of Ukraine.	
Dzharylhach	Джарилгацький		10000	Kherson Oblast	2009	Covers Dzharylhach Island and the adjacent Karkinit Bay in the northern reaches of the Black Sea. Famous for clean sandy beaches and mineral springs in its many small lakes, Dzharylhach is the largest island in the Black Sea. Portions of the park have been protected nature reserves for almost 100 years.	
Grand Meadow	Великий Луг		16756	Zaporizhzhia Oblast	2006	Covers historic steppe terrain in southeast Ukraine. It is on the south bank of the Dnieper River's Kakhovka Reservoir, which was created by the Dnieper Hydroelectric Station. The meadows and reed beds on the shore support one of the largest transmigration spots for birds in Eastern Europe.	
Halych	Галицький		14685	Ivano-Frankivsk Oblast	2004	Highlights forest, steppe, meadow and wetlands of the borderlands between the Ukrainian Carpathians and the southwestern part of the East European Plain.	
Hetman	Гетьманський		23360	Sumy Oblast	2009	The park begins at the border with Russia as the Vorskla River runs west and south, and follows the river for all 122 km of its length through Sumy Oblast. There are some short breaks between sectors for roads or built-up villages. The terrain is mostly flat, with some hills and ravines.	
Holosiiv	Голосіївський		4525	Kyiv	2007	A protected remnant of forest surrounded by the urban area of the city of Kyiv, Ukraine. It is located on the Kyiv Hills, in the Dniester-Dnieper forest-steppe province, North-Dnieper lowland and steppe zone of Left-Bank Dnieper province.	
Holy Mountains	Святі Гори		40609	Donetsk Oblast	1997	Located along the chalk cliffs and river terraces of the Donets River in Eastern Ukraine. The park's boundaries are a patchwork of forested areas stretching along the banks of the Donets. The Holy Mountains of Ukraine contain many archaeological, natural, historical, and recreational sites.	
Homilsha Woods	Гомільшанські ліси		14315	Kharkiv Oblast	2004	Covers established forests in the Donets River valley. The site has been a protected area for a very long time, beginning with Peter the Great designating local territory as a 'protected ship grove' for wood to build ships. The site also has high ecological value as forest-steppe land.	
Hutsulshchyna	Гуцульщина		32271	Ivano-Frankivsk Oblast	2002	Located in the Western Ukraine's Carpathian Mountains.	
Ichnia	Ічнянський		9666	Chernihiv Oblast	2004	Covers forest-steppe terrain in the Udai River basin, about 120 km northeast of Kyiv.	
Ivory Coast of Sviatoslav	Білобережжя Святослава		35223	Mykolaiv Oblast	2009	Ivory Coast of Sviatoslav Park is situated on the north coast of the Black Sea in southern Ukraine. It covers portions of Dnieper–Bug estuary, the Kinburn Peninsula just south of the estuary, and Yahorlyk Bay a shallow bay of the Black Sea itself. Adjacent to the site along the coast is the Black Sea Biosphere Reserve.	
Kamianka Sich	Кам'янська Січ		12261	Kherson Oblast	2019	Located on the right bank of the southern part of Kakhovka Reservoir.	
Karmeliuk's Podillia	Кармелюкове Поділля		16518	Vinnytsia Oblast	2009	Located in southwest Ukraine on the forested southern slopes of the Ukrainian Shield.	
Kholodnyi Yar	Холодний яр		6833	Cherkasy Oblast	2022	Located in southeastern Cherkasy Oblast (see Kholodnyi Yar). The Maksym Zalizniak oak tree is located on the territory of the park.	—
Khotyn	Хотинський		9400	Chernivtsi Oblast	2010	Covers a segment of the Dniester River Canyon and the Dniester River Reservoir. It is located in the west of the country on the border with Romania. The famous Khotyn Fortress is located within the territory.	
Kremenets Mountains	Кременецькі гори		6,951	Ternopil Oblast	2009	A cluster of mountains and ridges in the Holohoro-Kremenetskyi range of the Podolian Upland in west central Ukraine.	
Kreminna Woods	Кремінські ліси		7,269	Luhansk Oblast	2019	Located in the basin of the Donets River, near the city of Kreminna.	—
Kuialnyk	Куяльницький		10,800	Odesa Oblast	2022	Located in and near the Kuialnyk Estuary.	—
Lower Dnieper	Нижньодніпровський		80,177	Kherson Oblast	2015	Consists of the islands in the Dnieper River delta. The entire park was flooded on June 7–8, 2023, due to the Kakhovka dam collapse.	—
Lower Dniester	Нижньодністровський		21,311	Odesa Oblast	2008	A large portion of the Dniester River Estuary where it enters the Black Sea in southwestern Ukraine. The floodplains and waterways are important to nesting and wintering waterfowl and spawning fish, with over 70 species of fish in 20 groups recorded in the park.	
Lower Polissia	Мале Полісся		9,515	Khmelnytskyi Oblast	2013	A section of the Polissia region; the park includes several lakes and wetland areas, as well as parts of the valleys of the Horyn, Viliia, and Hnylyi Rih Rivers.	
Lower Sula	Нижньосульський		16,879	Poltava Oblast	2010	Covers the lower reaches of the Sula River as it enters the Kremenchuk Reservoir, about 120 km southeast of Kyiv. Its extensive marshes and wetlands are important habitats for fish, waterfowl, and floodplain plants.	
Meotyda	Меотида		20,720	Donetsk Oblast	2009	A stretch of coastline, estuaries, and coastal lands on the northern edge of the Sea of Azov in Ukraine. Administration of the park has been disrupted by hostilities. Previously, it supported significant populations of migratory waterfowl and over 100 species of nesting birds.	
Mezyn	Мезинський		31,035	Chernihiv Oblast	2006	Forest and floodplain terraces of the Desna River in northern Ukraine. The park was created to balance protection of sensitive ecological and archaeological sites with recreation and rural agriculture.	
Nobel	Нобельський		25318	Rivne Oblast	2019	Located in northwestern Rivne Oblast. The park protects a series of lakes and wetlands surrounding Lake Nobel in the Polissia region.	—
Northern Podillia	Північне Поділля		15588	Lviv Oblast	2010	Covers a variety of individual protected sites in the northwestern Podolian Upland of Ukraine. The park provides protection to representative ecological and cultural sites of the area, including hornbeam–beech forested uplands, swamp–marsh floodplains, karst features, and historical landmarks such as three castles and World War sites.	
Oleshky Sands	Олешківські піски		8020	Kherson Oblast	2010	The largest desert in Ukraine, located near the Dnieper River delta. Its sandy dunes and semi-arid vegetation create a unique landscape unlike any other in the country.	
Podilski Tovtry	Подільські Товтри		80178	Khmelnytskyi Oblast	2015	Representative of the natural landscape of the Podillia region, featuring limestone ridges and forest–steppe ecosystems that form part of the Tovtry Ridge.	
Pryazovia	Приазовський		78127	Zaporizhzhia Oblast	2010	The second-largest national park in Ukraine, covering the estuaries, coastal plains, and seaside landforms around the Molochna River and Utlyuk Estuary in Pryazovia on the northern coast of the Sea of Azov.	
Prypiat–Stokhid	Прип'ять-Стохід		39316	Volyn Oblast	2007	Created to protect and unify a series of natural complexes of the Pripyat River and Stokhid River valleys in northwestern Ukraine. The park safeguards the meadows, floodplains, and wetlands of the Polissia region and serves as a major habitat for migratory waterfowl.	
Pushcha Radzivila	Пуща Радзівіла		24265	Rivne Oblast	2022	Covers the basin of the Stvyha River in northwestern Ukraine. It protects forest and wetland ecosystems characteristic of the Polissia region.	—
Pyriatyn	Пирятинський		12028	Poltava Oblast	2009	Covers a portion of the Udai River valley in north-central Ukraine. It provides nature conservation and recreation on the terraces and floodplains of the river.	
Royal Beskids	Королівські Бескиди		8997	Lviv Oblast	2020	Covers the left-bank portion of the Dniester River basin from Staryi Sambir to Strilky, and also the basins of the Yablunka, Linynka, and Tysovychka rivers in the Eastern Carpathians.	—
Shatsk	Шацький		32515	Volyn Oblast	1983	Established to preserve, reconstitute, and sustainably use the unique natural complexes of Volyn Polissia, including lakes, forests, and wetlands of exceptional ecological, recreational, and aesthetic value.	
Skole Beskids	Сколівські Бескиди		35684	Lviv Oblast	1999	Covers the Skole Beskids Range of the Carpathian Mountains on the western edge of Ukraine. The park protects beech and beech–fir forests and provides for environmental, ecological, educational, and recreational uses.	
Sloboda	Слобожанський		5244	Kharkiv Oblast	2009	Covers a forest–steppe region at the confluence of the Merla and Merchik Rivers in the East Poltava Highlands. The park features an extensive complex of marshes, swamps, and other wetlands.	
Synevyr	Синевир		40400	Zakarpattia Oblast	1989	Located in the Zakarpattia Oblast in southwestern Ukraine, the park is centered around Lake Synevyr and surrounding mountain ecosystems of the Carpathians.	
Syniohora	Синьогора		10866	Ivano-Frankivsk Oblast	2009	Transition to full national park status was uncertain as of 2017, with portions of the park closed to the public.	—
Tsumanska Pushcha	Цуманська пуща		33475	Volyn Oblast	2010	Located in southeastern Volyn Oblast.	
Tuzly Lagoons	Тузловські лимани		10866	Odesa Oblast	2009	Includes the group of Tuzly Lagoons: parts of the larger lagoons Shahany, Alibey, and Burnas; and the small lagoons Solone Ozero, Khadzhyder, Karachaus, Budury, Martaza, Mahala, Malyi Sasyk, and Dzhantshei.	
Uzh	Ужанський		39159	Zakarpattia Oblast	1999	Part of the East Carpathian Biosphere Reserve. The park protects pristine beech forests of the Carpathians.	
Verkhovyna	Верховинський		12023	Ivano-Frankivsk Oblast	2010	Covers the highest reaches of the Cheremosh River in the Carpathian Mountains.	
Vyzhnytsia	Вижницький		7928	Chernivtsi Oblast	1995	Located in the Ukrainian Carpathians, Vyzhnytsia Park represents a lowland part of the Carpathians with a mild climate. The area is forested with beech and fir trees.	—
Yavoriv	Яворівський		7079	Lviv Oblast	1998	A narrow range of hills 75 km (47 mi) long, which rises sharply to the north of the Lesser Polissya.	
Zacharovanyi Krai	Зачарований край		6101	Zakarpattia Oblast	2009	Located in Khust Raion in the Ukrainian Carpathians.	
Zalissia	Залісся		14836	Kyiv Oblast	2009	Covers a large forest on the left bank of the Desna River, about 20 km northeast of Kyiv. As of 2017, the area is open for limited public access, but is primarily administered as a protected area for “the reception and stay of senior officials”, other state uses, and the protection of plant and animal life.	

== Proposed parks ==
List of proposed National Parks of Ukraine
Name	Ukrainian name	Photo	Area	Location	Year (Note: Year park officially proposed.)	Description	Refs.
Berezan	Березанський		–	Mykolaiv Oblast	2023	Covers the Berezan Estuary, Beikul Estuary, and the valleys of Berezan and Sasyk rivers.	–
Berezhany Opillia	Бережанське Опілля		11800	Ternopil Oblast	2021	Proposed in Ternopil Oblast to preserve forest and meadow ecosystems of the Berezhany region.	–
Budzhak Steppes	Буджацькі степи		9729.7	Odesa Oblast	2023	Covers steppe and forest areas of Budjak.	–
Chaikovychi	Чайковицький		up to 10000	Lviv Oblast	2013	Covers wetlands near the right bank of the Dniester River south of Chaikovychi village.	–
Darnytsia	Дарницький		–	Kyiv	–	Covers multiple forested areas in eastern Kyiv.	–
Divychky	Дівички		16648	Kyiv Oblast	2012	Covers forest-steppe and swamp regions on the left bank of the Dnieper, southwest of Pereiaslav.	–
Dnieper Islands	Дніпровські Острови		8444.62	Kyiv	2004	Covers most of Kyiv's islands and some peninsulas on the Dnieper and a part of Horbachykha.	
Dnieper–Teteriv	Дніпровсько-Тетерівський		30402.3	Kyiv Oblast	2008	Covers the Teteriv Estuary and the forested area nearby.	
Hirskyi Tikych	Гірський Тікич		4908	Cherkasy Oblast	2017	Covers the entire Hitskyi Tikych River valley and some surrounding areas, including Buky Canyon and 11 sites of Cucuteni–Trypillia culture (such as Talianky and Maidanetske).	
Hromokliia	Громоклійський			Mykolaiv Oblast	2023	Covers the steppe landscape of Hromokliia River basin and parts of the right bank of Inhul River.	
Izium Meadow	Ізюмська Лука			Kharkiv Oblast	2021	Covers territories by the Siverskyi Donets River near Izium that currently belong to Izium Meadow Regional Landscape Park.	
Kremenchuk Reedbeds	Кременчуцькі Плавні		around 10000	Kirovohrad Oblast, Poltava Oblast	2008	Covers islands and parts of the Dnieper River near Kremenchuk.	
Lower Vorskla	Нижньоворсклянський		23200	Poltava Oblast	2006	Covers the Vorskla River estuary and nearby areas that currently belong to Lower Vorskla Regional Landscape Park.	
Nadbuzhzhia in the name of Eminent Liubomyr Huzar	Надбужжя ім. Блаженнішого Любомира Гузара		3294	Lviv Oblast	2018	Covers floodplains of Western Bug and other rivers around Sokal.	
Opillia	Опілля		16790.6	Lviv Oblast	2023	Covers forests and other territories around Dniester River in Lviv and Stryi raions.	
Podesinnia	Подесіння			Chernihiv Oblast, Kyiv Oblast	2008	Covers most of the Desna River valley in Chernihiv and Kyiv oblasts.	
Pryirpinnia and Chernechyi Forest	Приірпіння та Чернечий ліс		17932.4	Kyiv Oblast	2018	Covers forests near Irpin River to the southwest of Kyiv and the Chernechyi Forest.	
Saksahan Sich	Саксаганська січ		7957	Dnipropetrovsk Oblast	2016	Covers the Saksahan River basin.	
Sviatoshyn–Pushcha-Vodytsia	Святошинсько-Пуща-Водицький			Kyiv		Covers protected areas in the Sviatoshyn-Bilychi forest massif in Kyiv, including the Golden Forest preserve and some areas that currently belong to Holosiiv National Park.	
Upper Pobuzhzhia	Верхнє Побужжя		108000	Khmelnytskyi Oblast	2013	Covers the upper Southern Bug basin. As of 2015, the park was projected to be created by 2021. As of January 2024, the park has not been created.	
Western Pobuzhzhia	Західне Побужжя		17423.4	Volyn Oblast	2018	Covers floodplains of Western Bug and Luha rivers within southwestern Volyn Oblast.	
Zhdymyr	Ждимир		21600	Zakarpattia Oblast		Covers Polonyna Borzhava in the Carpathians.	

== See also ==
- List of nature reserves of Ukraine
- Nature park
- Categories of protected areas of Ukraine
