= Yavoriv National Nature Park =

National park in Ukraine

- Яворівський національний природний парк
- IUCN category II (national park)
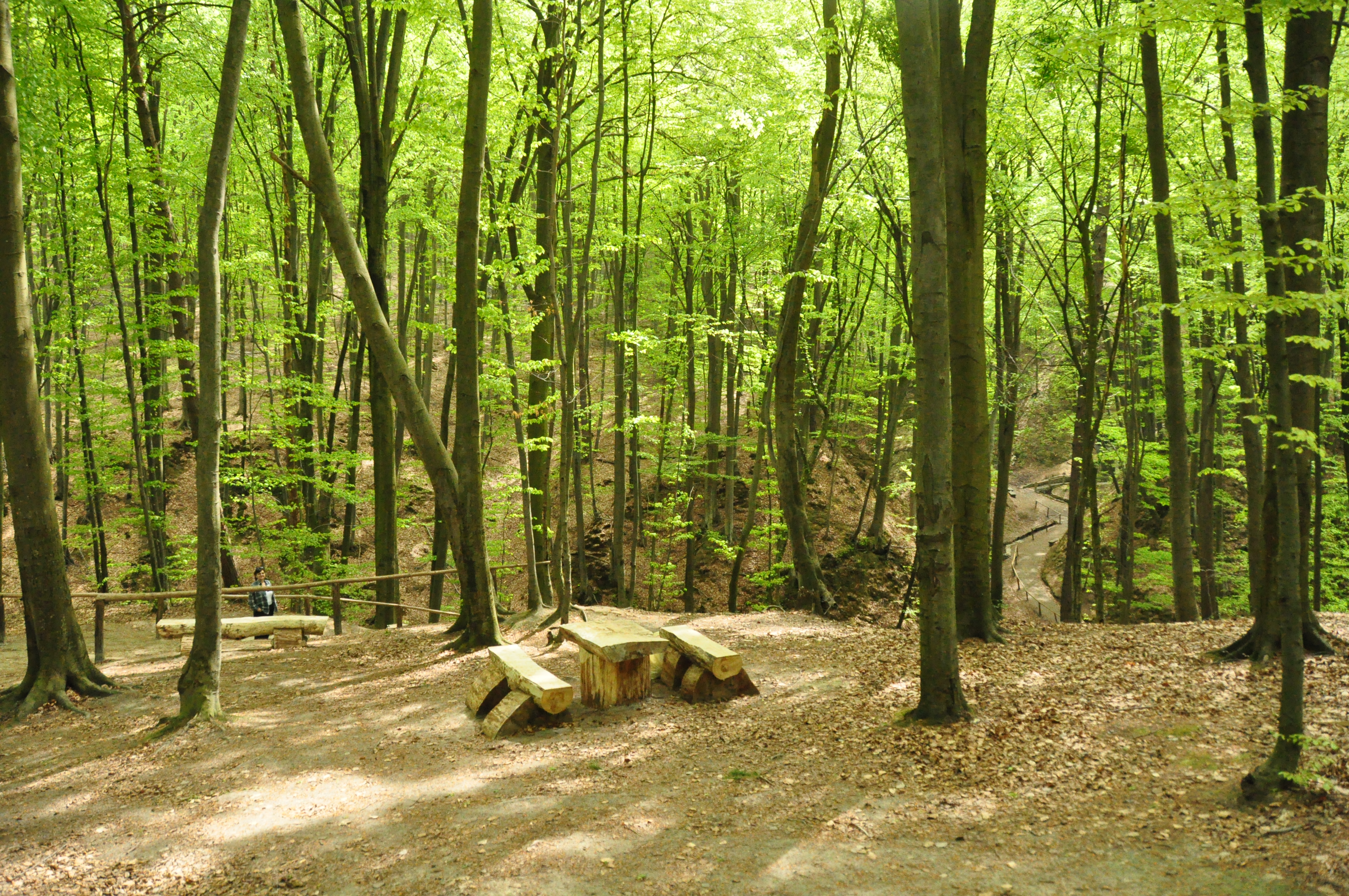
- Yavoriv National Park

- Location within Ukraine
- Location: Western Ukraine
- Nearest city: Novoiavorivsk, Ivano-Frankove
- Coordinates: 49.981°N 23.732°E
- Area: 7,108 ha (17,560 acres)
- Established: 1996
- Website: http://yavorpark.in.ua/

The Yavoriv National Nature Park (Ukrainian: Яворівський національний природний парк) is a national park located in the Ukrainian Roztocze, one of the most unusual physiographic regions of Western Ukraine. Ukrainian Roztocze is a narrow (average 25 km (16 mi)) range of hills 75 km (47 mi) long, which rises sharply to the north of the Lesser Polissia. In the southeastern part of it, the main European watershed, on the slopes of which originate rivers belonging to the basins of two seas - the Black Sea and the Baltic.

== History ==
The park was established July 4, 1998, by the President of Ukraine on the base of Yavoriv Regional Landscape Park (which existed here since 1996 in the area of 4,190 hectares (10,400 acres)) and surrounding areas of Yavoriv military base and Maherivskoho forestry enterprises. The total area of the national park is 7,108 hectares (17,560 acres), of which 2,915 ha (7,200 acres) park provided for permanent use, and 4,193 ha (10,360 acres) incorporated into its structure without removal from the land. In the institution has 44 people, including the scientific division - 4, in the service of - 16 people.

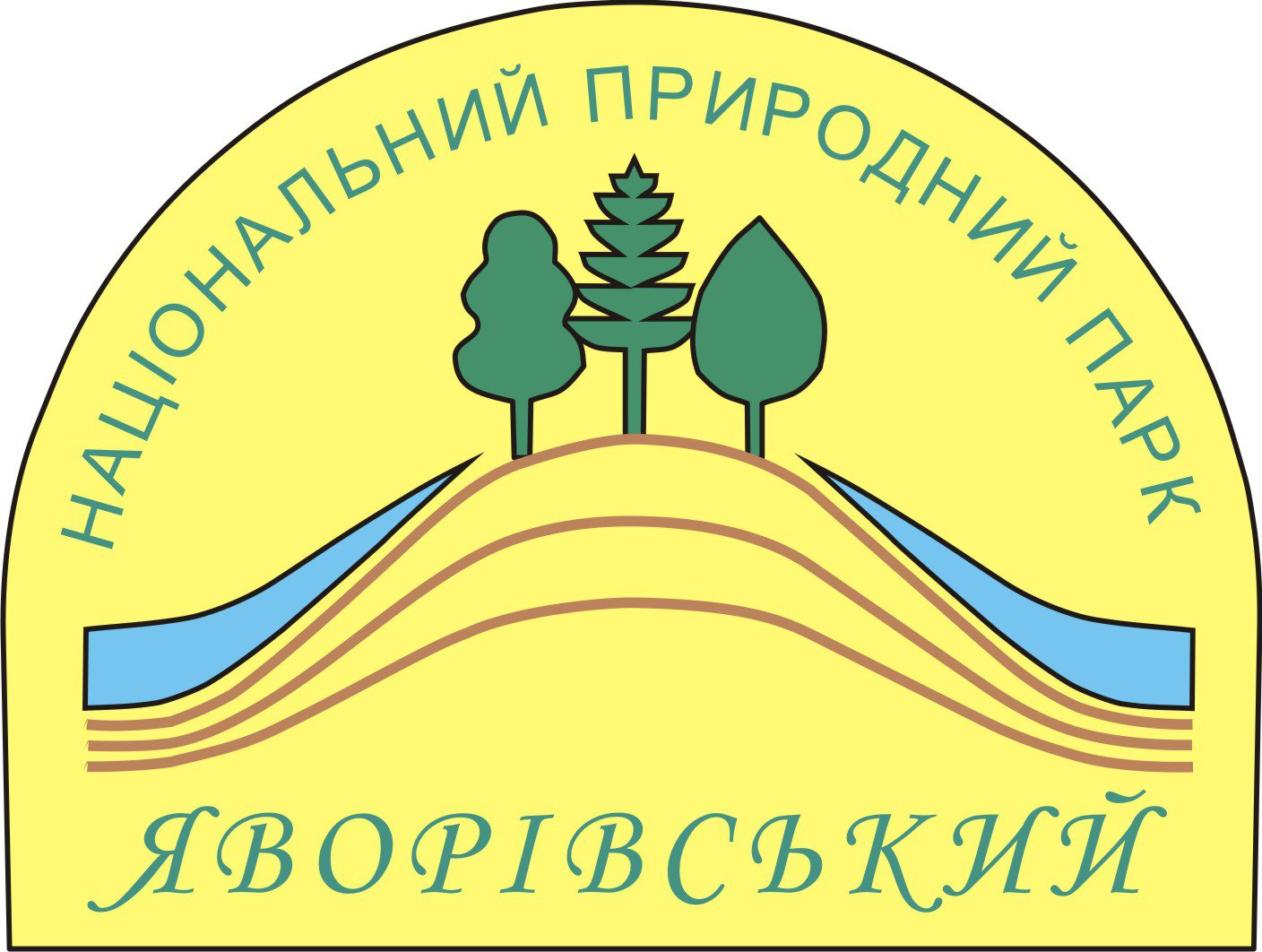
Park logo

== Climate ==
The climate of the area is typical for Roztocze that is located in the boundary zone of influence of the Atlantic air currents from the west and continental - from the east. Overall climate is moderately humid. Average annual rainfall is 700 mm (28 in) and the average temperature - 7.5 °C (45.5 °F). The most rainfall in June and July, and the lowest - in January and February. The hottest month - July (17.7 °C (63.9 °F)) and the coldest - January (−4.2 °C (24.4 °F)). Annual temperature fluctuations are small and reaches 21.9 °C (71.4 °F).

== Geography ==
For Yavorivskyi National Park as a whole, for Roztocze characterized by high forest cover. Here most common hornbeam-oak and pine-oak and pine forests, and in depressions - alder. Beech forests grow near the Eastern border of the range and are confined to the hilly landscape. Interesting island surviving pockets of spruce, fir and sycamore, which remained on the northeastern limit of its range. By the middle Holocene, relicts are beech and pine forests. Herbaceous vegetation occupies a much smaller area and formed by natural meadows and areas of former pastures and settlements, as well as along rivers and channels. Due to favorable natural conditions the national park also has considerable recreational potential and is an interesting tourist destination.
