= Pontic–Caspian steppe =

One of the Eurasian steppes

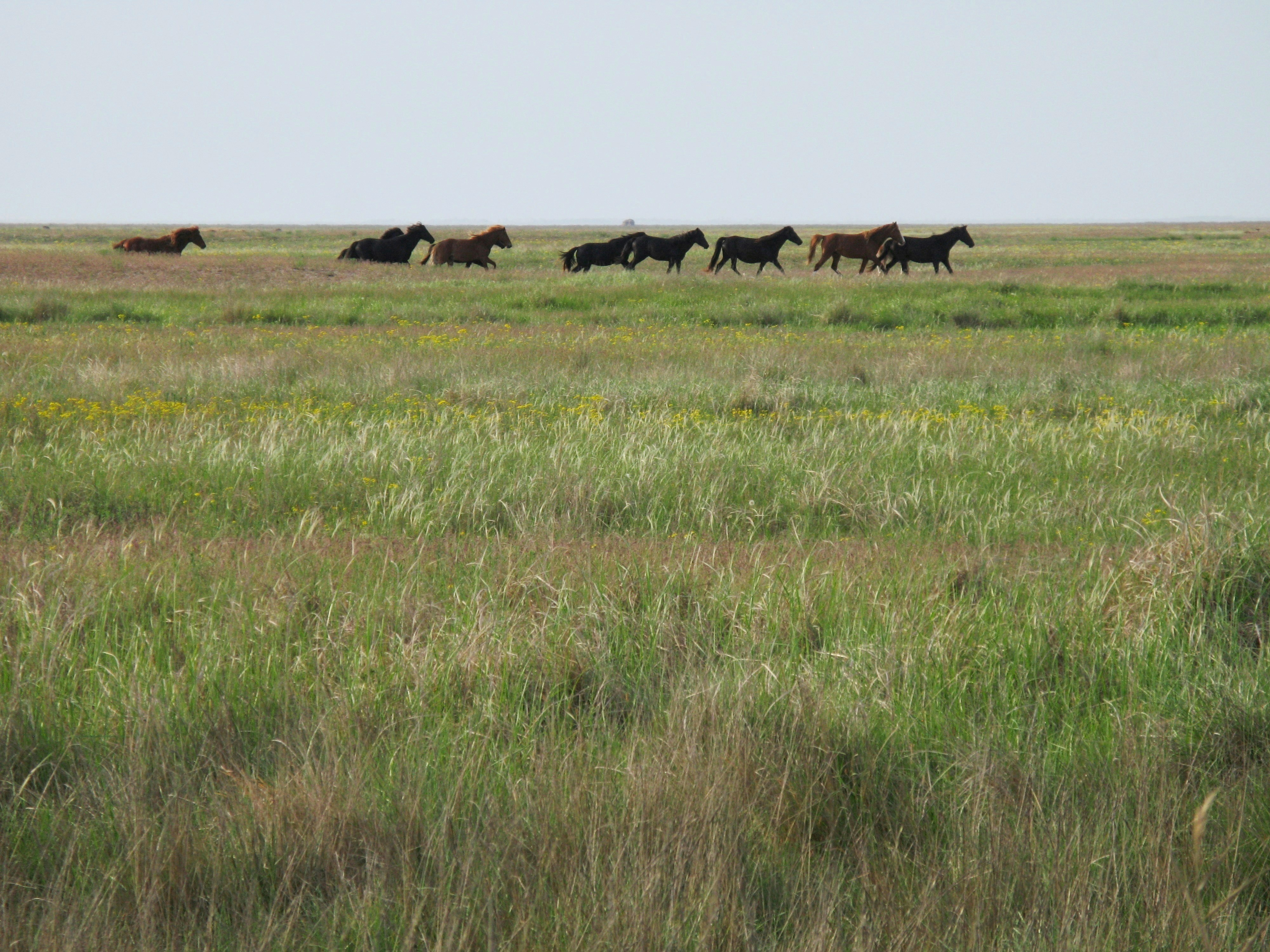
- The steppe in Azov-Syvash National Nature Park, Ukraine, with reintroduced horses.

- The steppe extends roughly from the Danube to the Ural River. This map shows the region known as the Pontic Steppe, which is the biggest portion of the whole Pontic–Caspian Steppe.

Ecology
- Realm: Palearctic
- Biome: Temperate grasslands, savannas, and shrublands
- Borders: List: Caspian lowland desert; Caucasus mixed forests; Central European mixed forests; Crimean Submediterranean forest complex; East European forest steppe; Kazakh semi-desert; Kazakh steppe

Geography
- Area: 994,000 km^{2} (384,000 mi^{2})
- Countries: List: Bulgaria; Kazakhstan; Moldova; Romania; Russia; Ukraine

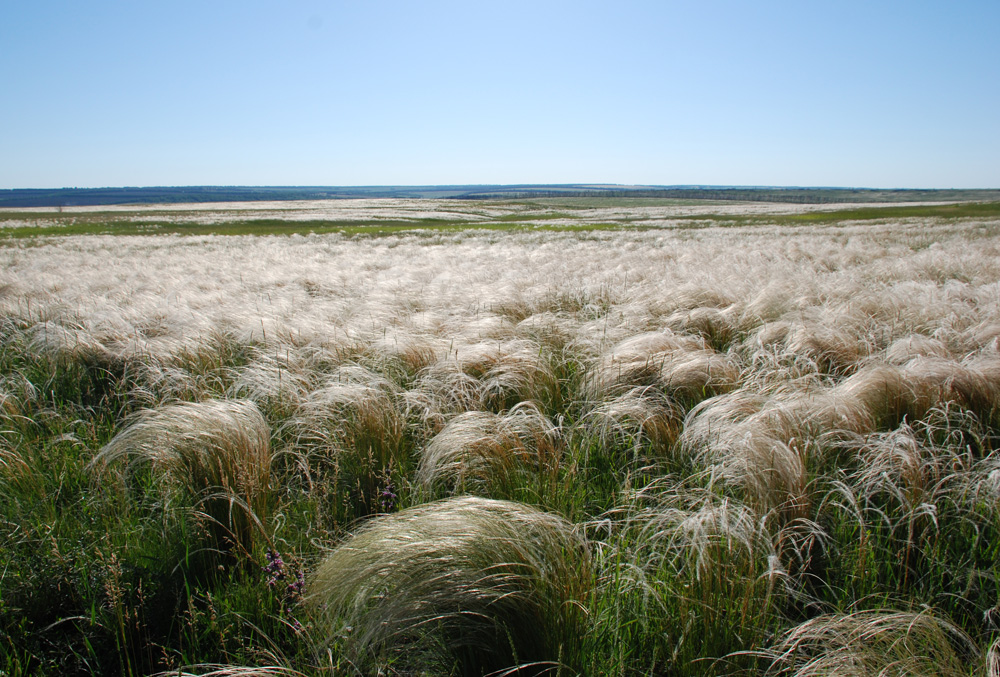
Streltsovskaya Steppe, a preserved area in Milove Raion in Luhansk Oblast, Ukraine. The steppe is often dominated by plumes of Stipa in early summer.

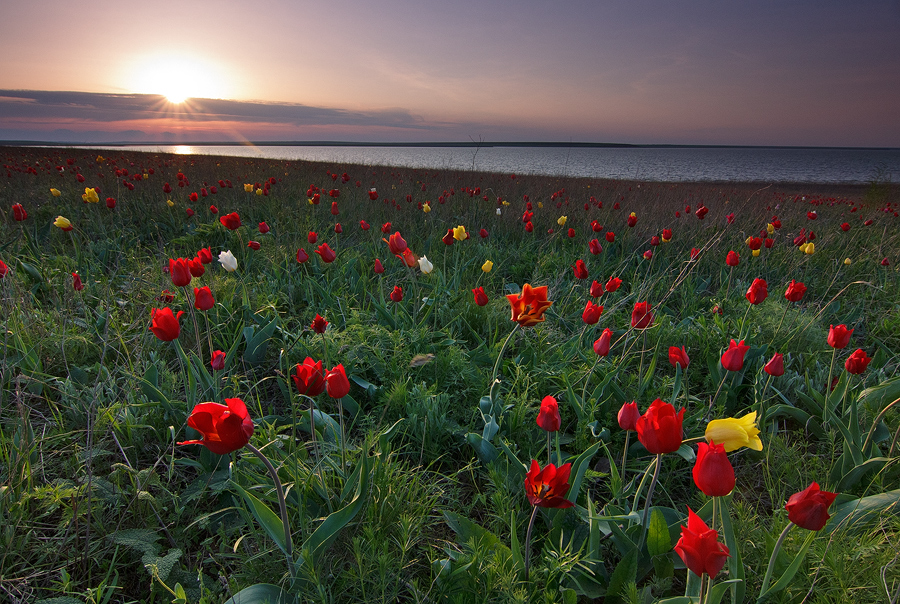
Tulipa suaveolens, one of the most typical spring flowers of the Pontic–Caspian steppe

The Pontic–Caspian steppe extends across Eastern Europe to Central Asia, formed by the Caspian and Pontic steppes. It stretches from the northern shores of the Black Sea (the Pontus Euxinus of antiquity) to the northern area around the Caspian Sea, where it ends at the Ural-Caspian narrowing, which joins it with the Kazakh Steppe in Central Asia, making it a part of the larger Eurasian Steppe. Geopolitically, the Pontic–Caspian Steppe extends from northeastern Bulgaria and southeastern Romania through Moldova, southern and eastern Ukraine, through the North Caucasus of southern Russia, and into the Lower Volga region where it straddles the border of southern Russia and western Kazakhstan. Biogeographically, it is a part of the Palearctic realm, and of the temperate grasslands, savannas, and shrublands biome.

The area corresponds to Cimmeria, Scythia, and Sarmatia of classical antiquity. Across several millennia, numerous tribes of nomadic horsemen used the steppe; many of them went on to conquer lands in the settled regions of Central and Eastern Europe, West Asia, and South Asia.

The region contains flora and fauna distinctive of these steppes, covering species that are native to the surrounding waters of the Black Sea, the Caspian Sea, and the Azov Sea. Genetic research has identified this region as the most probable place where horses were first domesticated. The Kurgan hypothesis, the most prevalent theory in Indo-European studies, posits that the steppe was the homeland of the speakers of the Proto-Indo-European language.

== Geography and ecology ==
The steppe covers an area of 994,000 km^{2} (384,000 sq mi) of Central and Eastern Europe, that extends from northeastern Bulgaria and southeastern Romania, through Moldova, and southern and eastern Ukraine, through the Northern Caucasus of southern Russia, and into the Lower Volga region of western Kazakhstan, to the east of the Ural Mountains. It is bounded by the East European forest steppe to the north, a transitional zone of mixed grasslands and temperate broadleaf and mixed forests. To the south, the steppe extends to the Black Sea, except the Crimean and western Caucasus mountains' border with the sea, where the Crimean Submediterranean forest complex defines the southern edge of the steppes. It extends to the western shore of the Caspian Sea in the Dagestan region of Russia, but the drier Caspian lowland desert lies between the steppe and Caspian Sea. The Kazakh Steppe bounds the steppe to the east. According to historian Alex M. Feldman, the Pontic-Caspian steppe, together with the forest-steppe and forest lands to the north, forms a historical biogeographical and political region which can be termed Pontic-Caspian Eurasia.

The Ponto-Caspian seas are the remains of the Turgai Sea, an extension of the Paratethys which extended south and east of the Urals and covering much of today's West Siberian Plain in the Mesozoic and Cenozoic.

== Protected areas ==
A significant number of protected areas of the Pontic–Caspian steppe has been under illegal Russian military occupation since the War in Donbas (2014–2022) and the 2022 Russian invasion of Ukraine. There has been much negative environmental impact of the war in eastern Ukraine, and later environmental impact of the Russian invasion of Ukraine. For instance, the Dzharylhach National Nature Park was reportedly thoroughly devastated by uncontrolled fires in November 2023 due to "Russian armed aggression" during the Russian occupation of Kherson Oblast.

| Name | Country | Year | km² | IUCN | Notes |
|---|---|---|---|---|---|
| Askania-Nova | Ukraine | 1898 | 333 | Ib | One of the Seven Natural Wonders of Ukraine. |
| Balta Mică a Brăilei Natural Park | Romania | 2000 | 18 | V | Designated in 1978. |
| Black Sea Biosphere Reserve | Ukraine | 1984 | 891 | Ia | |
| Danube Delta/Fluxes | Romania; Ukraine | 1938; 1973 | 45 ? | Ia | Extensions in 1998. |
| Dnieper–Oril Nature Reserve | Ukraine | 1990 | 38 | Ia | |
| Luhansk Nature Reserve | Ukraine | 1968 | 80 | Ia | |
| Provallia Steppe Nature Reserve | Ukraine | 1975 | 6 | Ia | Part of Luhansk Nature Reserve. |
| Stanytsia-Luhanska Reserve | Ukraine | 1968 | 5 | Ia | Part of Luhansk Nature Reserve. |
| Striltsivskyi Steppe Nature Reserve | Ukraine | 1948 | 10 | Ia | Part of Luhansk Nature Reserve. |
| Triokhizbenskyi Steppe Reserve | Ukraine | 2008 | 33 | Ia | Part of Luhansk Nature Reserve. |
| Opuk Nature Reserve | Ukraine | 1998 | 16 | Ia | In Eastern Crimea. |
| Ukrainian Steppe Nature Reserve | Ukraine | 1961 | 28 | Ia | Includes the Chalk Flora Nature Reserve (11.34 km²). |
| Yelanets Steppe Nature Reserve | Ukraine | 1996 | 17 | Ia | |
| Azov–Syvash National Nature Park | Ukraine | 1993 | 526 | II | |
| Bug Gard National Nature Park | Ukraine | 2009 | 61 | II | On the western edge of the Pontic–Caspian steppe. |
| Charming Harbor National Nature Park | Ukraine | 2009 | 109 | II | In Western Crimea. |
| Dzharylhach National Nature Park | Ukraine | 2009 | 100 | II | |
| Grand Meadow National Nature Park | Ukraine | 2006 | 168 | II | In the Great Meadow of Ukraine. |
| Holy Mountains National Nature Park | Ukraine | 1997 | 406 | II | |
| Homilsha Woods National Nature Park | Ukraine | 2004 | 143 | II | Transition zone between the East European forest steppe ecoregion (on the north) and the Pontic–Caspian steppe ecoregion (on the south). |
| Ivory Coast of Sviatoslav National Nature Park | Ukraine | 2009 | 352 | II | |
| Kamianka Sich National Nature Park | Ukraine | 2019 | 60 | II | |
| Kislovodsk National Park | Russia | 2016 | 10 | II | Southern edge of the Pontic–Caspian steppe. |
| Lower Dniester National Nature Park | Ukraine | 2008 | 213 | II | |
| Lower Sula National Nature Park | Ukraine | 2010 | 186 | II | |
| Măcin Mountains National Park | Romania | 2000 | 11 | II | In the Măcin Mountains. |
| Meotyda National Nature Park | Ukraine | 2009 | 2072 | II | |
| Oleshky Sands National Nature Park | Ukraine | 2010 | 80 | II | |
| Pryazovia National Nature Park | Ukraine | 2010 | 781 | II | |
| Tuzly Lagoons National Nature Park | Ukraine | 2010 | 279 | II | |

== Prehistoric cultures ==
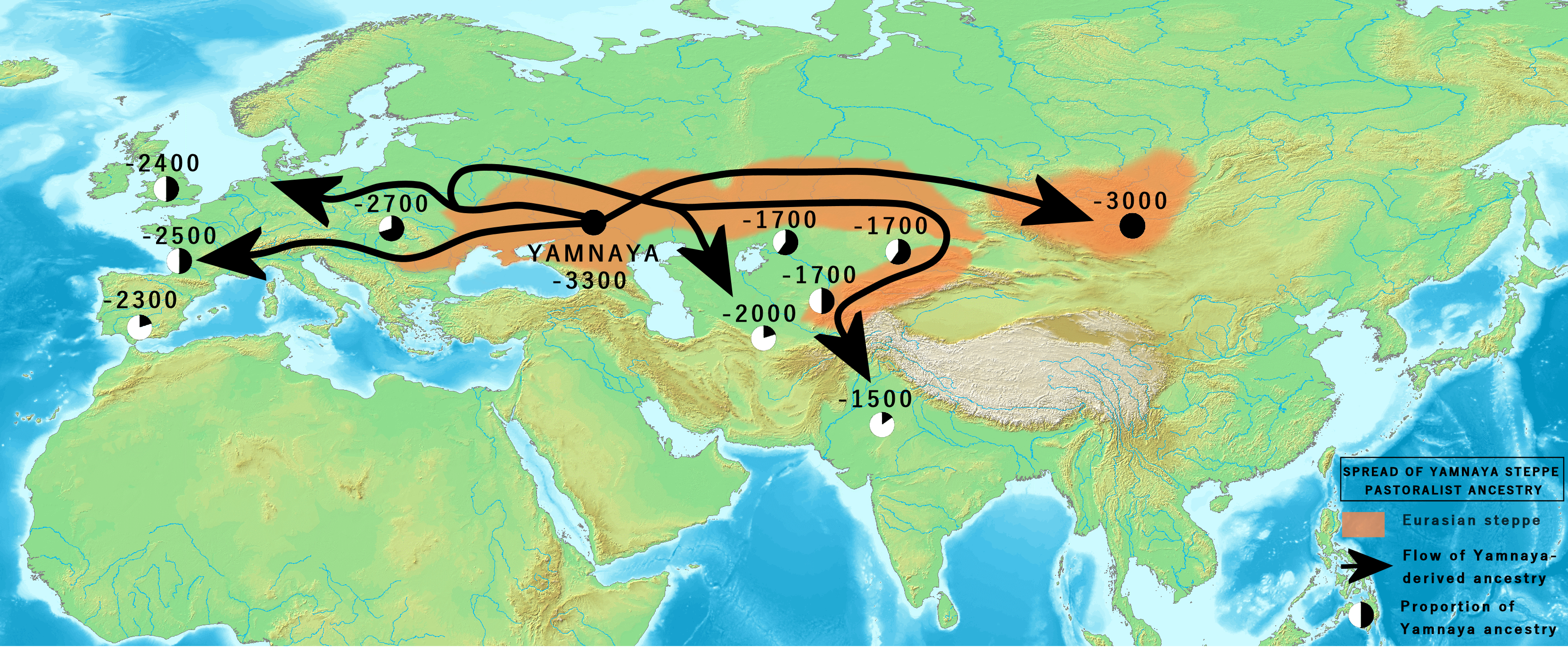
Bronze Age spread of Yamnaya steppe pastoralist ancestry into two subcontinents—Europe and South Asia—from c. 3000 to 1500 BCE

Innumerable tribes, cultures, nations, kingdoms, empires, etc. had origins in Pontic Caspian Steppes including:

- Linear Pottery culture 5500–4500 BCE
- Cucuteni-Trypillian culture 5300–2600 BCE
- Khvalynsk culture 5000–3500 BCE
- Sredny Stog culture 4500–3500 BCE
- Maykop culture 3700–3000 BCE
- Mykhailivka culture 3600—3000 BCE
- Yamnaya/Kurgan cultures 3500–2300 BCE
- Kura-Araxes culture 3000–2000 BCE
- Catacomb culture 3000–2200 BCE
- Srubna culture 1600–1200 BCE
- Koban culture 1100–400 BCE
- Novocherkassk culture 900–650 BCE

== Historical peoples and nations ==
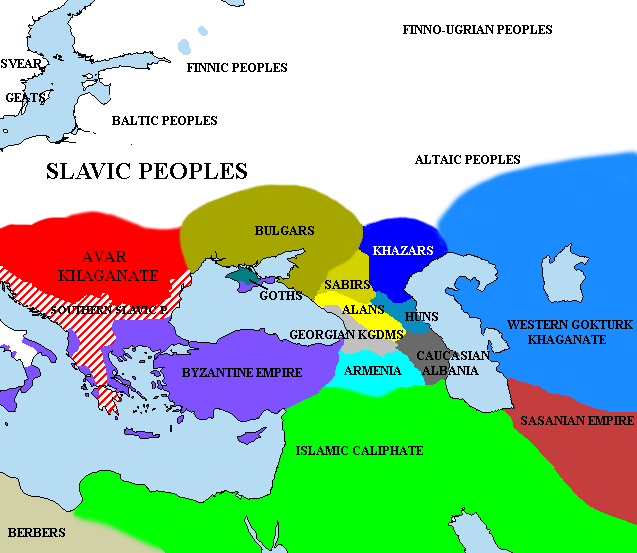
The Pontic–Caspian steppe in c. 650

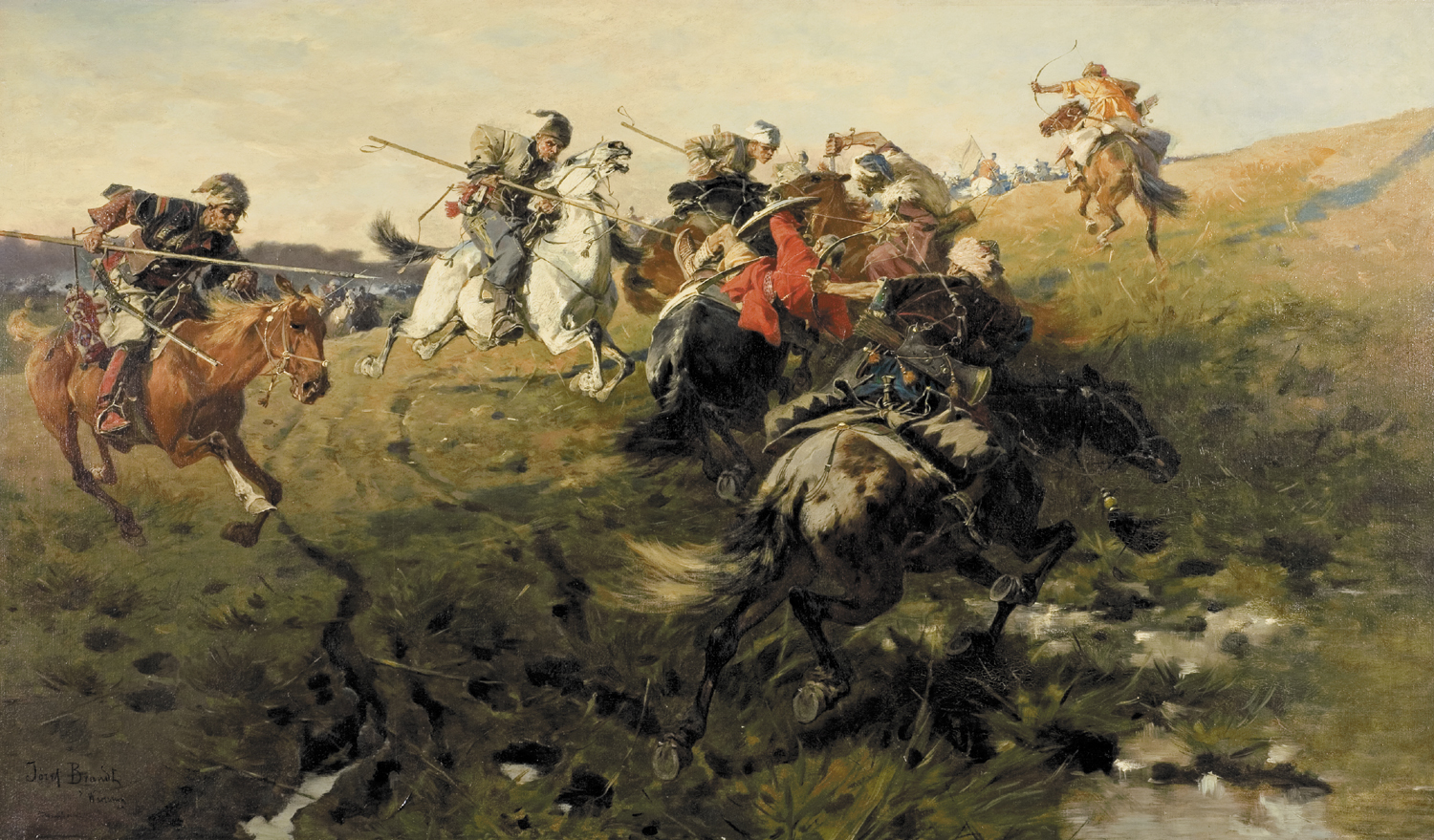
Zaporozhian Cossacks fighting Tatars from the Crimean Khanate – late 19th-century painting by Józef Brandt

Innumerable tribes, cultures, nations, kingdoms, empires, etc. had origins in the Pontic Caspian Steppes including:

- Indo-European cultures and states: 4th millennium BCE – now
  - Cimmerians: 12th–7th centuries BCE
  - Dacians and Thracians (Getae): 11th century BCE – 3rd century CE
  - Scythians: 8th–4th centuries BCE
  - Sarmatians: 5th century BCE – 5th century CE
  - Ostrogoths: 3rd–6th centuries
  - Alans: 5th–11th centuries
  - East Slavs: 8th-21st centuries
    - Kievan Rus': 8th–13th centuries
    - Russian Empire: 16th–20th centuries
    - Soviet Union: 20th century
    - Ukraine, Southern Russia: 20th-21st centuries
  - Bulgarians: 9th–21st centuries
    - First Bulgarian Empire: 7th–11th centuries
    - Second Bulgarian Empire: 12th–14th centuries
    - Principality of Karvuna: 14th century
  - Romania and Moldova: 14th-21st centuries
- Non-Indo-European cultures and states: 4th century – now
  - Bulgars and Onogurs: 4th–9th centuries:
    - Old Great Bulgaria: 7th century
  - Göktürks: 6th–8th centuries
  - Sabirs: 6th–8th centuries
  - Khazars: 6th–11th centuries
  - Huns and Avars: 4th–8th centuries
  - Pechenegs: 8th–11th centuries
  - Kipchaks and Cumans: 11th–13th centuries
  - Golden Horde: 13th–15th centuries
  - Eurasian Avars: 6th–8th centuries
  - Magyar tribes (Hungarians): 7th–9th centuries attested but probably from earlier
  - Cossacks, Kalmyks, Crimean Khanate, Volga Tatars, Nogais, and other Turkic states and tribes: 15th–18th centuries
  - Mountainous Republic of the Northern Caucasus: 19th–20th centuries
  - Kazakhstan: 21st century
