= Emerald Network of Ukraine =

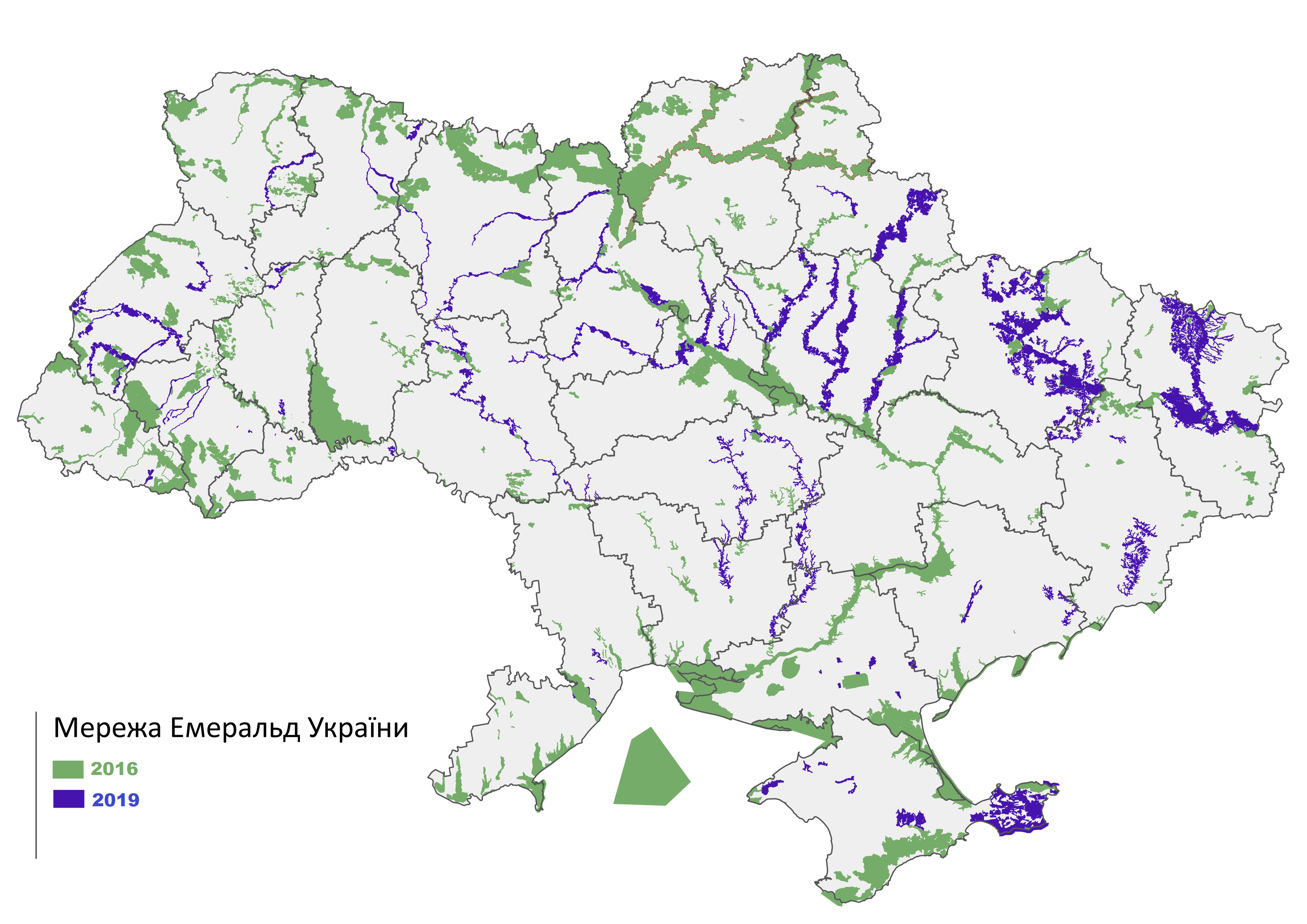
Emerald Network of Ukraine in 2019, the Ukrainian equivalent of Natura 2000, both part of the Emerald network of the Berne Convention on the Conservation of European Wildlife and Natural Habitats.

The Emerald Network of Ukraine (Note: Ukrainian: Смарагдова мережа України, romanized: Smarahdova merezha Ukrajini, or Мережа Емеральд України, Merezha Emeraljd Ukrajini.) is the Ukrainian part of the Emerald Network of Europe, which has been under development since 2009.

The Emerald Network comprises Areas of Special Conservation Interest (ASCI). The Emerald Network is being planned in the states that are parties to the Berne Convention on the Conservation of European Wildlife and Natural Habitats, which are a total of 50 states, plus the European Union (EU). In EU Member States, the Natura 2000 network is being established in accordance with the Berne Convention; it is designed on similar principles to the Emerald Network, but utilises the legal and financial instruments of the EU.

The lead organisation responsible for developing the Emerald Network in Ukraine is the Ministry of Environmental Protection and Natural Resources. The first phase of the Network (2009–2016) was developed by the charitable organisation ‘Interecocentre’. During this period, descriptions were prepared for 271 sites. Between 2017 and 2019, the non-governmental organisation Ukrainian Nature Conservation Group has been responsible for the design of the Emerald Network. In 2017–2018, justifications for the creation of a further 106 Network sites were developed and submitted for consideration by the Berne Convention. During the meeting of the Standing Committee of the Convention on 4–6 December 2019, 106 new sites were added to the network (No. 272–377).

== Prerequisites for creation ==
Participation in the Berne Convention on the Conservation of European Wildlife and Natural Habitats. Ukraine ratified the Convention in 1999. Signed and ratified Acceded or succeeded Not signed (states outside the Council of Europe)

Recommendation No. 16 (1989) served as the basis for establishing Areas of Special Conservation Interest (ASCIs).

The Convention on the Conservation of European Wildlife and Natural Habitats (hereinafter referred to as the Berne Convention or the Convention) was opened for signature on 19 September 1979 and entered into force on 1 June 1982. As of April 2026, 51 parties have acceded to the Convention, including the European Union. In 1996, subject to certain reservations set out in Law of Ukraine No. 436/96-VR of 29 October 1996, Ukraine also signed the Berne Convention on 17 August 1998, and ratified it on 5 January 1998. The Convention entered into force in the country on 1 May 1999.

The establishment of the Emerald Network stems from Recommendation No. 16 (1989) of the Standing Committee, which states that the Parties to the Convention should adopt legislative or other measures to designate the areas of the Emerald Network (ASCI), and ensure their conservation. Such an area must meet one or more of the following criteria:

- a. it contributes substantially to the survival of threatened species, endemic species, or any species listed in Appendices I and II of the convention;
- b. it supports significant numbers of species in an area of high species diversity or supports important populations of non or more species;
- c. it contains an important and/or representative sample of endangered habitat types;
- d. it contains an outstanding example of a particular habitat type or a mosaic of different habitat types;
- e. it represents an important area for one or more migratory species;
- f. it otherwise contributes substantially to the achievement of the objectives of the convention.

Although Recommendation 16 had established the criteria for ASCI as early as 1989, the actual design of the Network did not begin until 1998, following the adoption by the Standing Committee of Resolution No. 5, which gave the Network its official name 'the Emerald Network', and established a group of experts to work on the design of this network.

Recommendation No. 16 (1989), Resolution No. 3 (1996) and Resolution No. 5 (1998) of the Bern Convention provided initial, albeit limited, guidance on how the areas of the Emerald Network should be designated. Since, within the European Union, following the adoption of the Habitats Directive (1992)) and Birds Directive (2009).) Following the adoption of EU directives, the process of establishing the Natura 2000 network began, and it became necessary to harmonise the process of establishing these ecological networks, which share a common objective. In 2006, the process of harmonising the procedures for including ASCI sites in both networks began. It is envisaged that the Emerald Network sites, which were designated according to the same criteria as the Natura 2000 network sites, will be granted Natura 2000 status following a new country's accession to the EU.

In 1996, the Standing Committee of the Bern Convention adopted Resolution No. 4 – Listing endangered natural habitats requiring specific conservation measures. The lists of animal and plant species and habitats in Resolutions 4 and 6 are periodically updated on the basis of proposals from Member States.

The inclusion of areas in the Emerald Network is based on recent scientific data from the past few years regarding the presence in these areas of a certain proportion of the national population of species listed in Resolution 6 of the Bern Convention and/or areas of habitat types listed in Resolution 4 of the Bern Convention. The lists of species and habitats set out in these Resolutions are gradually being updated with contributions from Member States. Ideally, each country’s Emerald Network should be developed on the basis of a national database containing up-to-date information on the distribution of species and habitats as specified in Resolutions 4 and 6 of the Bern Convention.

== Biogeographic approach ==
Biogeographic regions of Europe

The inclusion of sites in the Emerald Network is based on the so-called biogeographic approach. The biogeographic approach means that the assessment of whether specific sites in the Emerald Network are sufficient for the long-term conservation of species and habitats is carried out within biogeographic regions. A biogeographic region is an area with relatively uniform ecological conditions and similar characteristics. The division into biogeographic regions is used in the planning of the Natura 2000 network in EU Member States, and in the planning of the Emerald Network in other countries.

The territory of Ukraine is divided between the Continental Biogeographic Region (which roughly corresponds to Polissia and the East European forest steppe), the Steppic Region (corresponding to the Pontic–Caspian steppe zone and the subtropical zone in the Crimean Mountains), the Alpine Region (the Ukrainian Carpathians) and the Pannonian Biogeographic Region, which includes the lowland part of Zakarpattia Oblast.

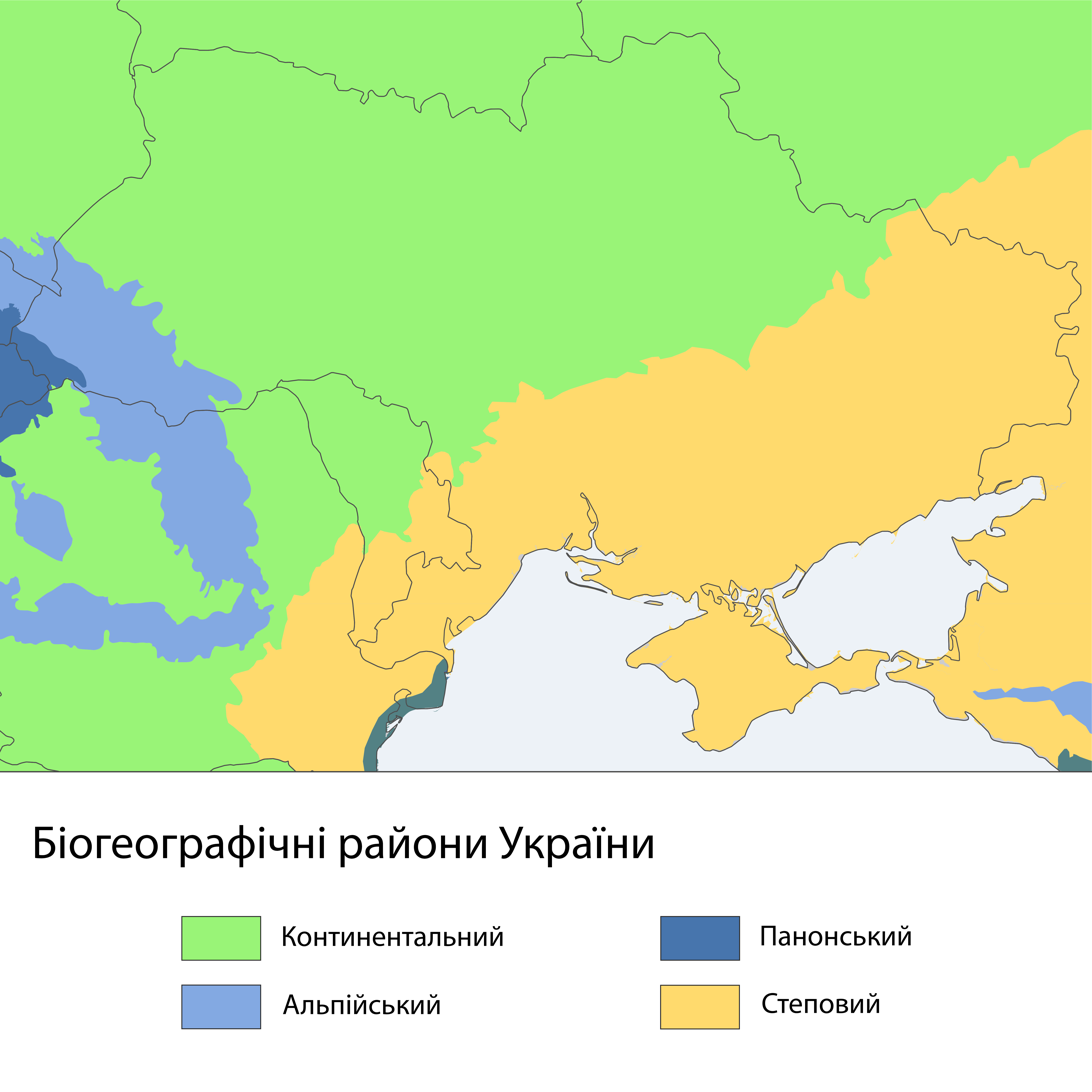
Biogeographic regions of Ukraine: Continental Alpine Pannonian Steppic

An assessment of whether the designated areas of the Emerald Network are sufficient to achieve the Network’s ultimate goal—ensuring the long-term conservation of species and habitats under the Bern Convention that require special conservation measures (as listed in Resolutions 4 and 6 of the Bern Convention)— also takes place at the biogeographic level during biogeographical seminars organised by the Bern Convention Secretariat as the Emerald Network is expanded in various countries.

The main difference between the approaches used in establishing the Emerald Network and the areas of the Nature Reserve Fund lies in the fact that the Emerald Network includes only those areas that are important for the conservation of species and habitats listed in Resolutions No. 4 and No. 6 of the Bern Convention within the context of biogeographic regions, whilst the decision to include areas in the Emerald Network is taken solely on the basis of scientific information regarding the presence in such areas of a certain proportion of the national population of species or habitat areas covered by the aforementioned Resolutions. The official decision to include territories in the Emerald Network is taken by the Standing Committee of the Bern Convention upon the proposal of a State Party to the Convention. A management plan will be developed in the future for each territory in the Emerald Network with the aim of conserving each of the species and habitats present within its territory.

One might get the impression that the Emerald Network covers only a small number of species and habitats; however, in reality, ensuring their protection would mean safeguarding virtually all areas within the country that are of genuine value for biodiversity conservation.

== Development (2009–2019) ==
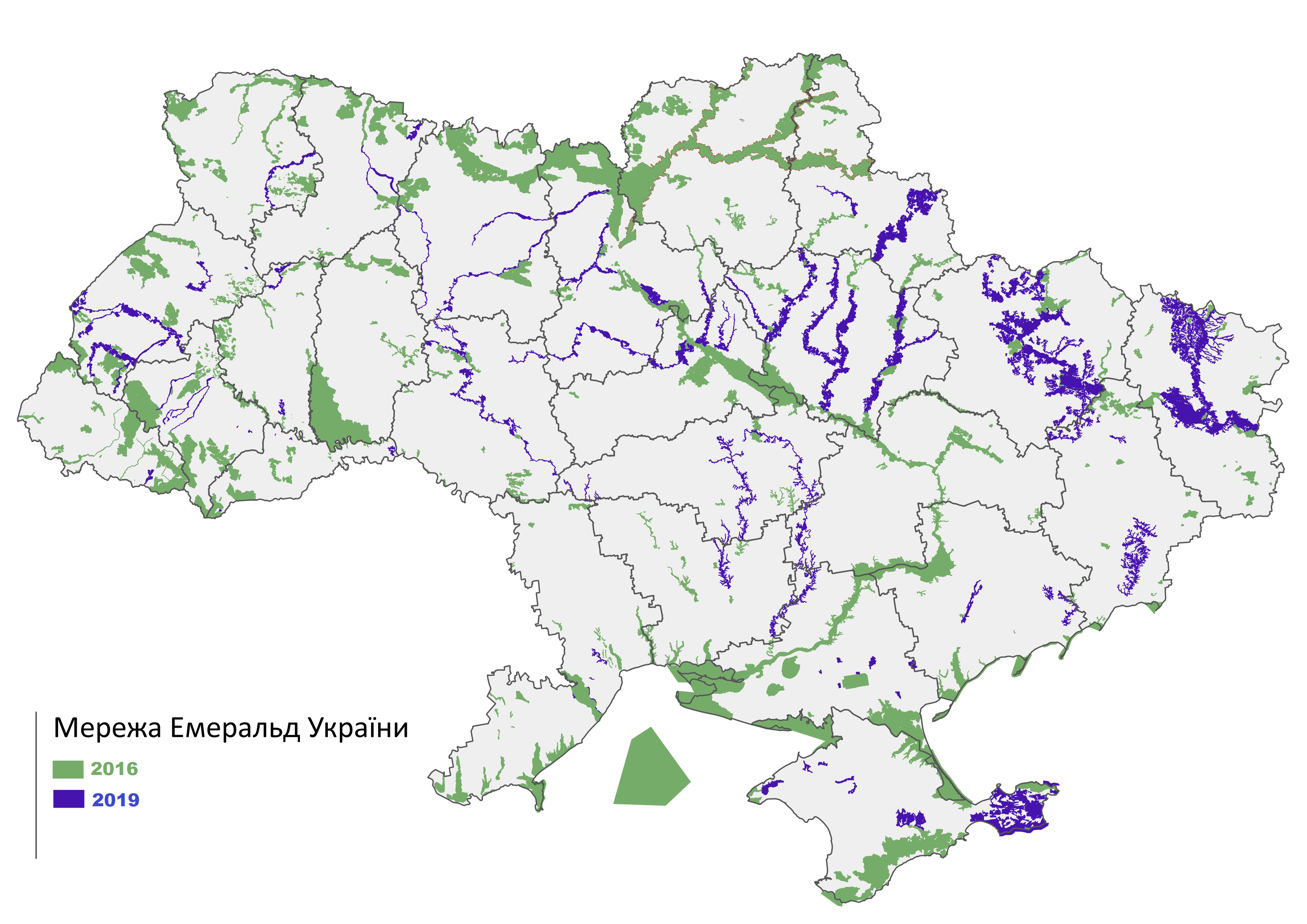
Emerald Network of Ukraine as of 4 December 2019. Protected areas added in 2016 Protected areas added in 2019

=== 2009–2013 ===
As of 2009, no inventory of biodiversity or monitoring of it had ever been carried out in the country.

Between 2009 and 2011, the first Joint Programme of the European Union and the Council of Europe was implemented to support the extension of the principles of the Natura 2000 network through the Emerald Network in Eastern Europe and the South Caucasus (hereinafter referred to as the Joint Programme). In Ukraine, the work was carried out by the charitable organisation ‘Interecentre’. The aim of the project was to identify and describe areas that met the criteria for inclusion in the Network; by the end of 2011, the official developers of the Network in Ukraine had proposed 151 areas for inclusion. Subsequent projects (October 2012–October 2016) were implemented under the second Joint Programme, funded by the European Union: ‘Establishment of the Emerald Network of Protected Areas – Phase II’. The projects under the second Joint Programme were aimed at establishing a fully operational pan-European Emerald network by 2020.

As the final outcome of the work carried out under the 2013 project, the Network’s official developers (the Interecocentre Charitable Foundation) prepared documentation for the designation of 159 Network sites, comprising: 18 nature reserves; 6 biosphere reserves; 43 national nature parks; 18 regional landscape parks; 31 protected areas of national and local significance of other categories; 6 Ramsar wetlands; 13 wetlands and 24 areas of high biodiversity, including species and habitats listed in Resolutions No. 4 and No. 6 of the Bern Convention. Even from this list, it can be concluded that the selection of territories was carried out administratively, rather than by creating a database and using it to identify territories that ensure the Network is sufficient for each of the species listed in Resolution 6 and the habitats listed in Resolution 4 (a catalogue of habitats that would assist in this matter will not be published until 2019) . Between 2013 and 2015, only 10 additional areas were included in it. In 2015–2016, the first round of biogeographical seminars was held to assess the adequacy of Ukraine’s Emerald Network for the conservation of species and habitats under Resolutions No. 4 and No. 6 of the Bern Convention.

=== 2014–2015 ===
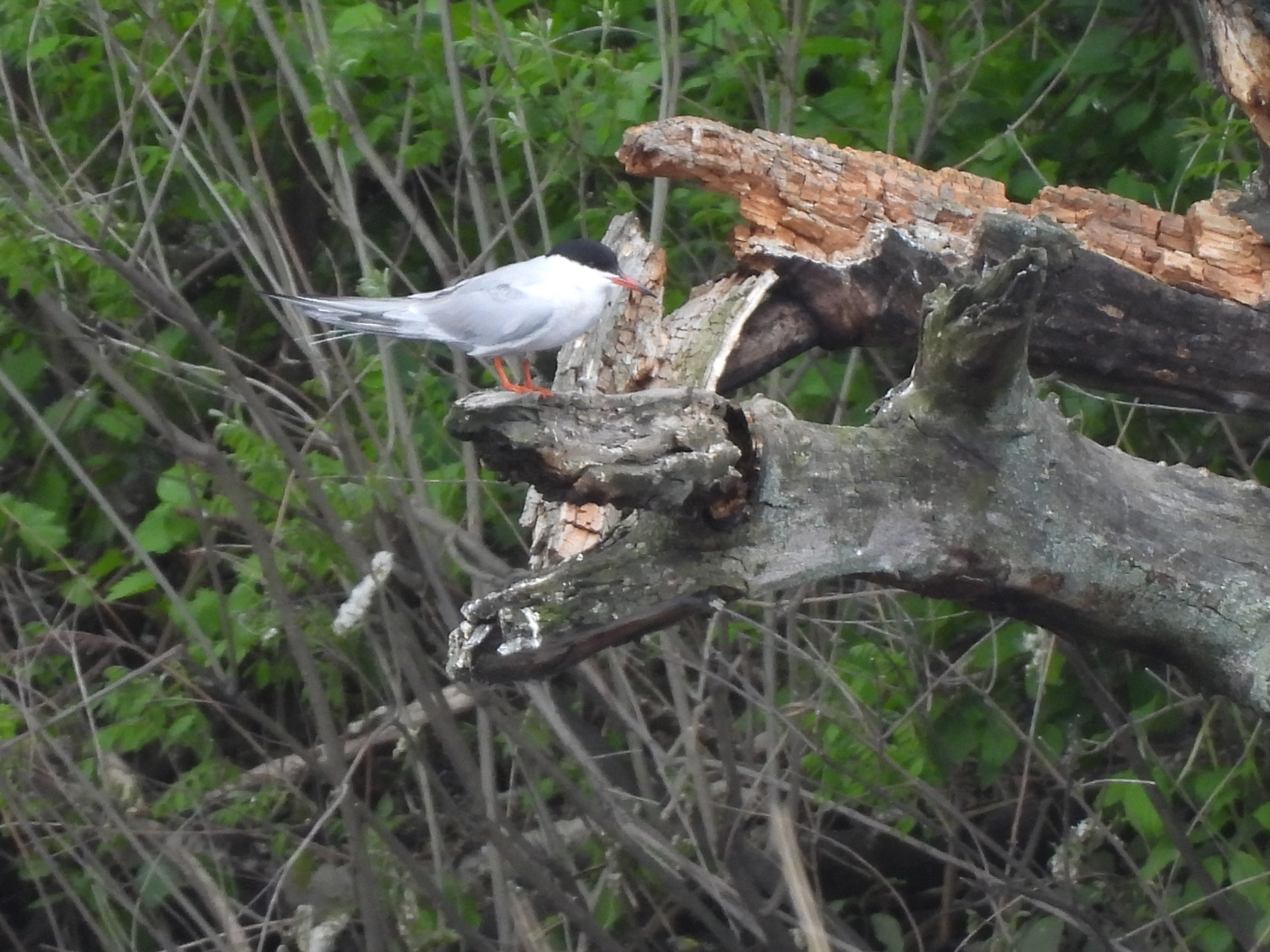
A common tern (Sterna hirundo) pictured in May 2022 at Willow Lake, a reserve in the Obolonskyi District of northern Kyiv.

On 27 June 2014, the Association Agreement between Ukraine and the European Union was signed, (hereinafter referred to as the Agreement), which was ratified by Ukraine on 16 September 2014. The Agreement entered into force on 1 September 2017. Under the Agreement, Ukraine undertakes to gradually align its legislation with that of the EU within the timeframes set out in Annex XXX to the Agreement; in particular, by 1 September 2021, work on establishing Emerald Network sites and implementing conservation and management measures must be completed. By Order No. 321 of the Ministry of Ecology and Natural Resources dated 14 October 2014, a Working Group on Nature Conservation (hereinafter referred to as the Working Group) was established, which drafted the bill ‘On the Emerald Network Areas’. The drafting of the Law, which is due to be approved in 2019, means that the Network must become operational. First and foremost, this concerns management — the implementation of specific measures for the conservation of species and habitats.

By including existing territories within the Emerald Network of the Nature Reserve Fund of Ukraine (ПЗФ, PZF), the developers (2009–2016) did not anticipate that the Network would actually become operational. Even the support programmes under which it was developed did not envisage the implementation of the Convention’s provisions as such: there were no plans to develop and introduce management and monitoring systems for the Network’s sites. In any case, without a comprehensive database, it would have been impossible to carry out this task.

At this stage, work is ongoing to expand the Network and prepare substantial amendments to the proposals put forward by the NGO ‘Interecocentre’, which were deemed inadequate and unsound at international level. These decisions were taken at a series of biogeographical seminars organised by the Secretariat of the Bern Convention. The review of the Emerald Network is being carried out by the NGO ‘Ukrainian Nature Conservation Group’ and the Public nature conservation initiative «Emerald – Natura 2000 in Ukraine».

In 2015–2016, the first round of biogeographicL seminars was held to assess the adequacy of Ukraine's Emerald Network for the long-term conservation of species and habitats covered by Resolutions No. 4 and No. 6 of the Bern Convention. All biogeographical seminars (with the exception of the seminar on the Steppic bioregion, which covered the territories of Ukraine, Moldova and the Russian Federation) for Ukraine were held jointly with three other countries (Moldova, Belarus and the Russian Federation). This was because the development of the Emerald Network in these countries was carried out within the framework of the joint EU and Council of Europe programme ‘Network of Protected Natural Areas, Phase II’, and also because the boundaries of most of the above-mentioned biogeographic regions considered during the seminars covered the territory of these countries.

24–25 November 2015 saw a biogeographical seminar held in Minsk (Belarus) to assess the adequacy of the Emerald Network for the conservation of bird species listed in Resolution No. 6 of the Bern Convention. A distinctive feature of this biogeographic seminar was that the assessment for each bird species was not carried out on a biogeographic regional basis, but rather considered the territory of each country as a whole. The delegation of NGO representatives at the seminar successfully argued that, for many bird species, the network established in Ukraine is insufficient and needs to be expanded (In particular, the following types received an ‘IN MOD’ rating: A193 Sterna hirundo, A195 Sterna albifrons, A196 Chlidonias hybridus, A197 Chlidonias niger, A198 Chlidonias leucopterus, A229 Alcedo atthis etc.).

=== 2016–2018 ===
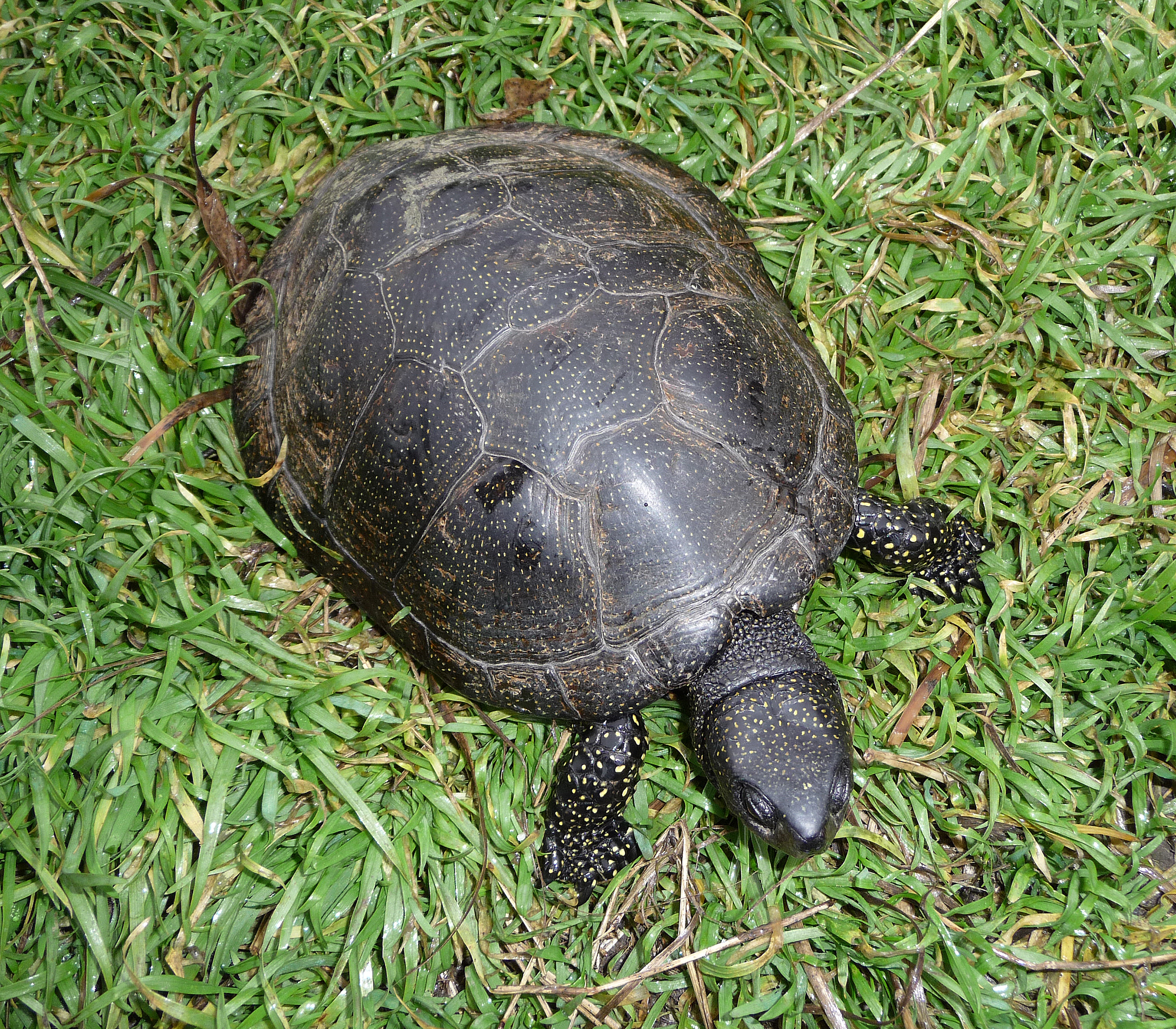
A European pond turtle (Emys orbicularis) pictured in 2009 at Lake Tiazhyliv near Vinnytsia.

11–13 May 2016 saw a biogeographic seminar held in Chișinău (Moldova) to assess the adequacy of the Emerald Network for the conservation of animal species (excluding birds), plant species and habitat types covered by Resolutions No. 4 and No. 6 of the Bern Convention in the Continental, Alpine and Pannonian biogeographic regions. For many species, the conservationists’ position was supported by independent experts participating in a seminar organised by the Secretariat of the Bern Convention, which obliged Ukraine to further expand the Network for these species.

- In particular, ‘IN MOD’ ratings were assigned in the Pannonian biogeographic region for the following species: 1308 Barbastella barbastellus, 1318 Myotis dasycneme, 1323 Myotis bechsteini, 1324 Myotis myotis, 1337 Castor fiber, 1220 Emys orbicularis, 1032 Unio crassus;
- in the Continental bioregion: «IN MOD» — 1014 Vertigo angustior, 1016 Vertigo moulinsiana, 1032 Unio crassus, 1074 Eriogaster catax; ‘IN MAJOR’ — The network had to be built from scratch for 1013 Vertigo geyeri;
- in the Alpine bioregion: «IN MOD» — 1032 Unio crassus, 1898 Eleocharis carniolica, ‘IN MAJOR’ — The network had to be built from scratch for 1014 Vertigo angustior.

On 6–8 September 2016, a biogeographical seminar was held in Kyiv to assess the adequacy of the Emerald Network for the conservation of animal species (excluding birds), plant species and habitat types listed in Resolutions No. 4 and No. 6 of the Bern Convention within the Steppic biogeographic region. It was decided at the seminar that marine areas would not be discussed there and that a separate seminar would be held for them at a later date (the date and venue are currently undecided). As this seminar took place in Kyiv, both the official delegation and the NGO delegation were represented by a larger number of participants than at previous seminars. Reinforced by experts from many taxonomic groups, the NGO delegation succeeded in demonstrating the inadequacy of the designated Network areas for many species and habitats. Thus, only 40% of plant species were assessed as ‘SUF’, whilst for the majority of plant species considered, the Network was deemed insufficient.

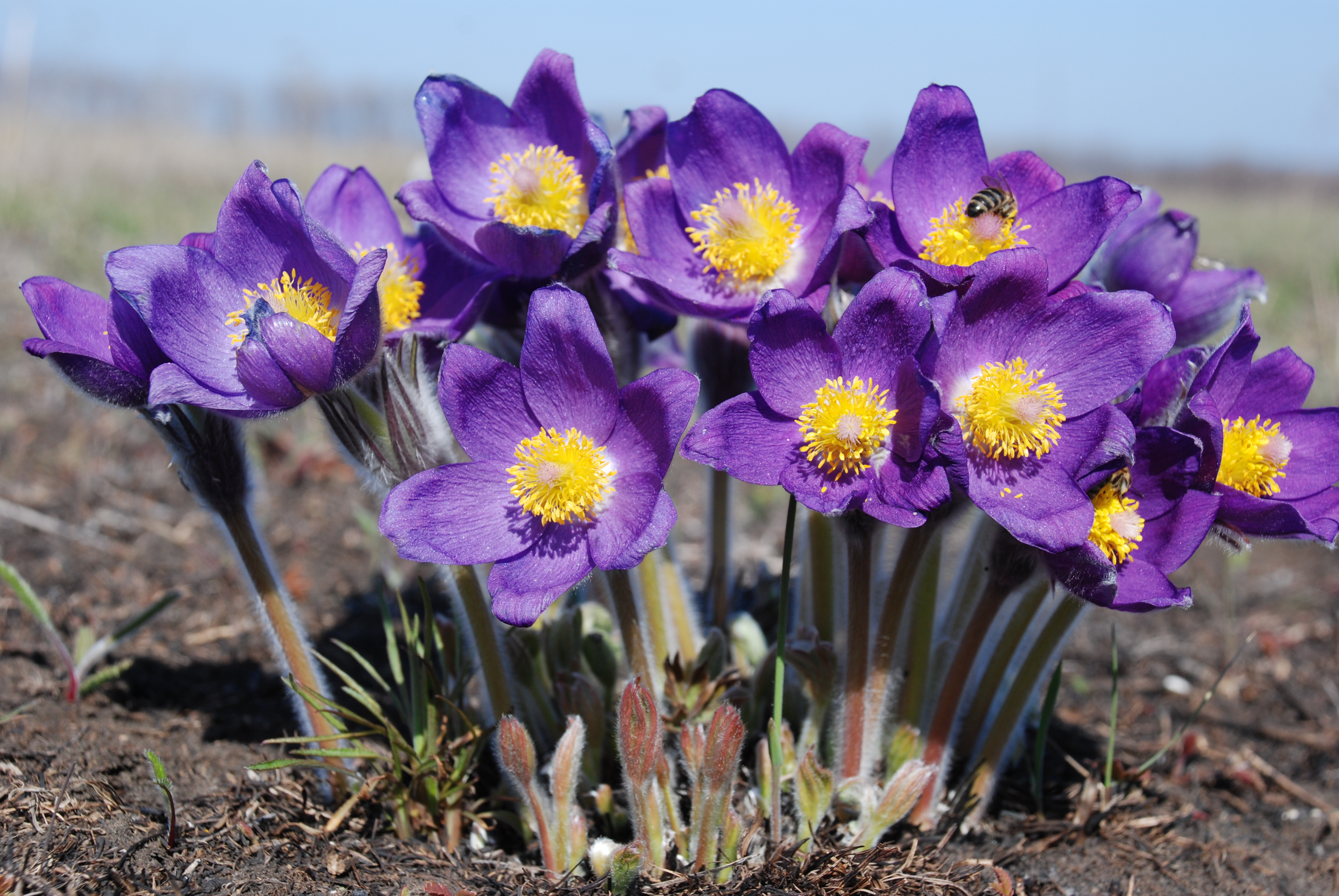
Pulsatilla patens, pictured in 2009 at the Striltsivskyi Steppe Nature Reserve.

- In particular, the following plant species were awarded the ‘IN MOD’ rating: 1477 Pulsatilla patens, 1805 Jurinea cyanoides, 2073 Dianthus hypanicus, 2081 Silene cretacea, 2136 Astargalus tanaiticus, 2267 Lagoseris purpurea, 2271 Serratula tanaitica, 4067 Echium russicum, 4068 Adenophora liliifolia, 4087 Serratula lycopifolia, 4091 Crambe tataria, 4095 Stipa zalesskii and 4098 Iris humilis ssp. arenaria.
- For plant species such as 2116 Schiverekia podolica and 4097 Iris aphylla ssp. hungarica, those rated ‘IN MAJ’, the network had to be rebuilt.
- A total of 30 settlements received an ‘IN MOD’ rating (A1.22, A1.44, A2.2, A3, B2.1, C1.223, C1.224, C1.3411, C1.3413, C1.5, C1.66, C2.27, C2.28, C2.34, C3.4, E1.13, E1.2, E1.9, E6.2, F3.247, F9.1, G1.11, G1.3, G3.4232, H1, H2.6, H3.1, H3.2, X18, X29).

Thus, Ukraine’s Emerald Network passed the ‘first round’ of assessment regarding its adequacy for the conservation of animal and plant species and habitats. The network is deemed inadequate, a finding officially confirmed by the final assessments of three biogeographical seminars. Furthermore, issues remain unresolved regarding the designation of the Black Sea biogeographical region in Ukraine, the conservation of intact river systems, the possibility of expanding the Network, and giving it the form of a spatially connected network.

On 23–24 May 2018, a biogeographical seminar was held in Kyiv to assess the suitability of selected areas within the Emerald Network for the conservation of bird species. The final conclusions of this seminar included assessments:

- «IN MIN/CD»: A002 Gavia arctica, A020 Pelecanus crispus, A022 Ixobrychus minutus, A135 Glareola pratincola, A234 Picus canus, A307 Sylvia nisoria; «IN MIN»: A068 Mergus albellus, A104 Bonasa bonasia, A138 Charadrius alexandrinus; «IN MOD/CD»: A030 Ciconia nigra, A032 Plegadis falcinellus, A080 Circaetus gallicus, A084 Circus pygargus, A089 Aquila pomarina, A097 Falco vespertinus, A403 Buteo rufinus, A511 Falco cherrug, A409 Tetrao tetrix tetrix, A119 Porzana porzana, A120 Porzana parva, A127 Grus grus, A154 Gallinago media, A167 Xenus cinereus, A177 Larus minutus, A195 Sterna albifrons, A196 Chlidonias hybridus, A197 Chlidonias niger, A198 Chlidonias leucopterus, A215 Bubo bubo, A217 Glaucidium passerinum, A222 Asio flammeus, A457 Strix nebulosa, A224 Caprimulgus europaeus, A229 Alcedo atthis, A231 Coracias garrulus, A236 Dryocopus martius, A241 Picoides tridactylus, A242 Melanocorypha calandra, A255 Anthus campestris, A272 Luscinia svecica, A339 Lanius minor, A379 Emberiza hortulana, A533 Oenanthe pleschanka; «IN MOD»: A023 Nycticorax nycticorax, A029 Ardea purpurea, A092 Hieraaetus pennatus, A404 Aquila heliaca, A108 Tetrao urogallus, A131 Himantopus himantopus, A132 Recurvirostra avosetta, A170 Phalaropus lobatus; «IN MIN/IN MOD/CD»: A060 Aythya nyroca, A396 Branta ruficollis, A397 Tadorna ferruginea, A072 Pernis apivorus, A073 Milvus migrans, A090 Aquila clanga.

== Shadow List (2016–2019) ==
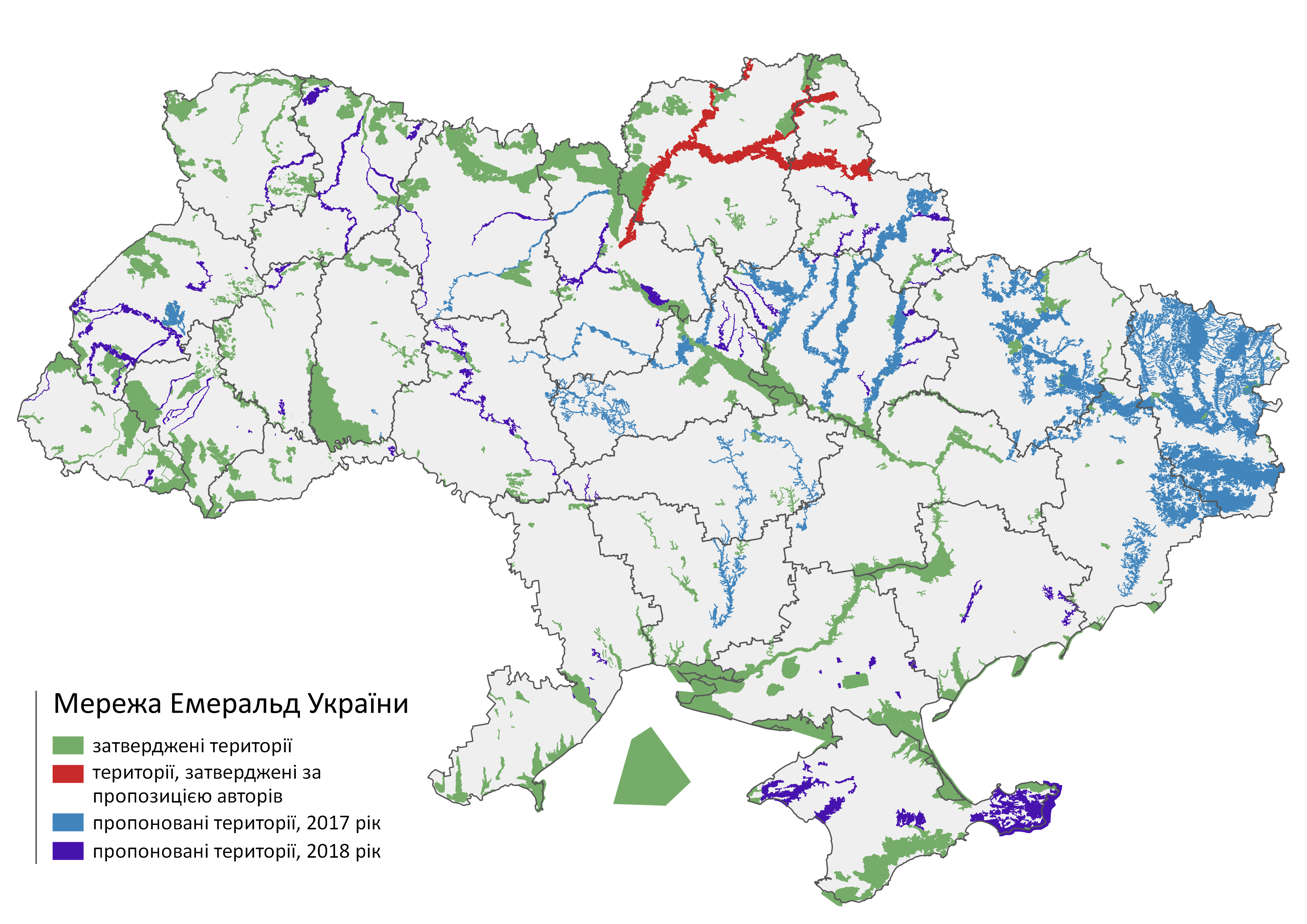
Shadow List proposed sites for the Emerald Network. Protected areas approved by the Berne Convention Standing Committee on 18 November 2016 Protected areas proposed by the Shadow List (end of 2016) Protected areas proposed by the Shadow List (2017) Protected areas proposed by the Shadow List (2018)

In 2016, the Public environmental initiative ‘Emerald — Natura 2000 in Ukraine’ (which was later joined by Ukrainian Nature Conservation Group) began developing a "Shadow List" («тіньового списку»): a list of areas which, based on scientific data, should be included in the Emerald Network of Ukraine.

The first phase of developing the Emerald Network’s Shadow List in Ukraine ran from September 2016 to August 2017. This resulted in the preparation of scientifically substantiated proposals for the inclusion of 78 new sites in the Emerald Network in Ukraine. In 2018, additional documentation was drawn up for the inclusion of a further 46 new areas in the Emerald Network.

All these proposals were finalised in collaboration with the Department of Ecological Networks and Nature Reserve Fund of the Ministry of Ecology and Natural Resources of Ukraine. The majority of them were submitted by the Ministry to the Secretariat of the Bern Convention in February 2019, and approved on 12 December 2019.

== Current status ==
The initial list of Emerald Territories for Ukraine was adopted in 2016 and, at that time, primarily included all existing nature reserves and national nature parks. The total area of the network to date stood at 5.8 million hectares (9% of Ukraine’s land area), but this has not yielded results everywhere, as 3.6 million hectares (5.7% of Ukraine’s land area, or 57% of the total area of Ukraine’s Emerald Network) consisted of territories that already had protected status. A further 1% of Ukraine’s territory (or 10% of the network’s area) was accounted for by the Dnieper reservoir cascade, which play an important role as a migration route for migratory birds. However, the water surfaces of the reservoirs are rarely visited, and their inclusion in the Emerald Network is unlikely to have had a significant impact. Thus, only 33% of the Emerald Network in Ukraine (2.5% of Ukraine’s area) in 2016 became areas for which inclusion in the network represented a real change: the granting of protected status.

A case in point is the current situation regarding the protection of the Polonynian Valley (Borzhava) in the Polonynian Beskids from plans to build a wind farm. At present, the defence of Ukraine’s most picturesque mountain pasture is effectively only being upheld thanks to the intervention of the Bern Convention.

Impressions from Seretskyi Hydrological Reserve, Ternopil Oblast (Wiki Loves Earth 2024 video winner)

The 106 new areas added in 2019 cover an area of 1.6 million hectares (adding a further 2.6% of Ukraine’s total area to the Network). All these areas consist of river valleys, complexes of steppe ravines, marshes and wild natural canyons. With a few exceptions, none of these areas previously had protected status.

The changes are particularly noticeable at the regional level. For instance, in the Lviv, Kirovohrad and Crimea oblasts, the number of Emerald Territories has doubled; in the Sumy and Donetsk oblasts, their area has doubled; in the Luhansk and Poltava oblasts, it has increased by 50 per cent; and in the Kharkiv oblasts, their number has quadrupled compared to before.

All these areas are important for species and natural habitats that are rare in Europe. It is particularly significant that many habitats, such as the majority of steppe habitats, are protected mainly in Ukraine, as the vast majority of countries that are parties to the Bern Convention do not have steppe areas. Steppe grasslands, chalk outcrops and chalk forests were included in Resolution 4 at Ukraine’s proposal, as these habitat types are absent in other European countries (apart from Russia, which was expelled from the Council of Europe on 16 March 2022 due to its unprovoked and illegal invasion of Ukraine).

In addition, in December 2019, the Emerald Network was launched as an information layer of the Public Cadastral Map of Ukraine.

On 23 June 2023, during the Russian invasion of Ukraine, the Russian Armed Forces destroyed the Kakhovka Dam, causing an environmental disaster.

== See also ==
- Birds Directive
- Habitats Directive
- Ecologische Autoriteit
- Emerald Network
- List of nature reserves of Ukraine
- Natura 2000
- Site of Community Importance
- Special Area of Conservation

== Literature ==
- Залучення громадськості та науковців до проектування мережі Емеральд (Смарагдової мережі) в Україні / Полянська К. В., Борисенко К. А., Павлачик П. (Paweł Pawlaczyk), Василюк О. В., Марущак О. Ю., Ширяєва Д. В., Куземко А. А., Оскирко О. С. та ін. / під ред. д.б.н. А.Куземко. — Kyiv, 2017. — 304 с.
- Тлумачний посібник оселищ Резолюції № 4 Бернської конвенції, що знаходяться під загрозою і потребують спеціальних заходів охорони. Третій проект версії 2015 року. Адаптований неофіційний переклад з англійської / укладачі: А.Куземко, С. Садогурська, К. Борисенко, О. Василюка — Kyiv, 2017. — 124 с.
- Василюк О., Борисенко К., Куземко А., Марущак О., Тєстов П., Гриник Є. Проектування і збереження територій мережі Емеральд (Смарагдової мережі). Методичні матеріали / Кол. авт., під ред. Куземко А. А., Борисенко К. А. — Kyiv: «LAT & K», 2019. — 78 с.
- Смарагдова мережа в Україні / Болтачев О. Р., Дідух Я. П., Соломаха Т. Д. та ін. (під ред. Л. Д. Проценка). Президія НАН України, Міністерство екології та природних ресурсів України, Інституту ботаніки ім. М. Г. Холодного НАН України, Українське товариство охорони птахів та ін. — Kyiv: Хімджест, 2011. — 192 с. — ISBN 978-966-8537-78-3
- Василюк О., Борисенко К., Куземко А., Марущак О., Тєстов П., Гриник Є. Проектування і збереження територій мережі Емеральд (Смарагдової мережі). Методичні матеріали / Кол. авт., під ред. Куземко А. А., Борисенко К. А. — Kyiv: «LAT & K», 2019. — 78 с.
