= Luhansk Nature Reserve =

Nature reserve in Luhansk Oblast, Ukraine

- Ukrainian: Луганський природний заповідник
- IUCN category Ia (strict nature reserve)
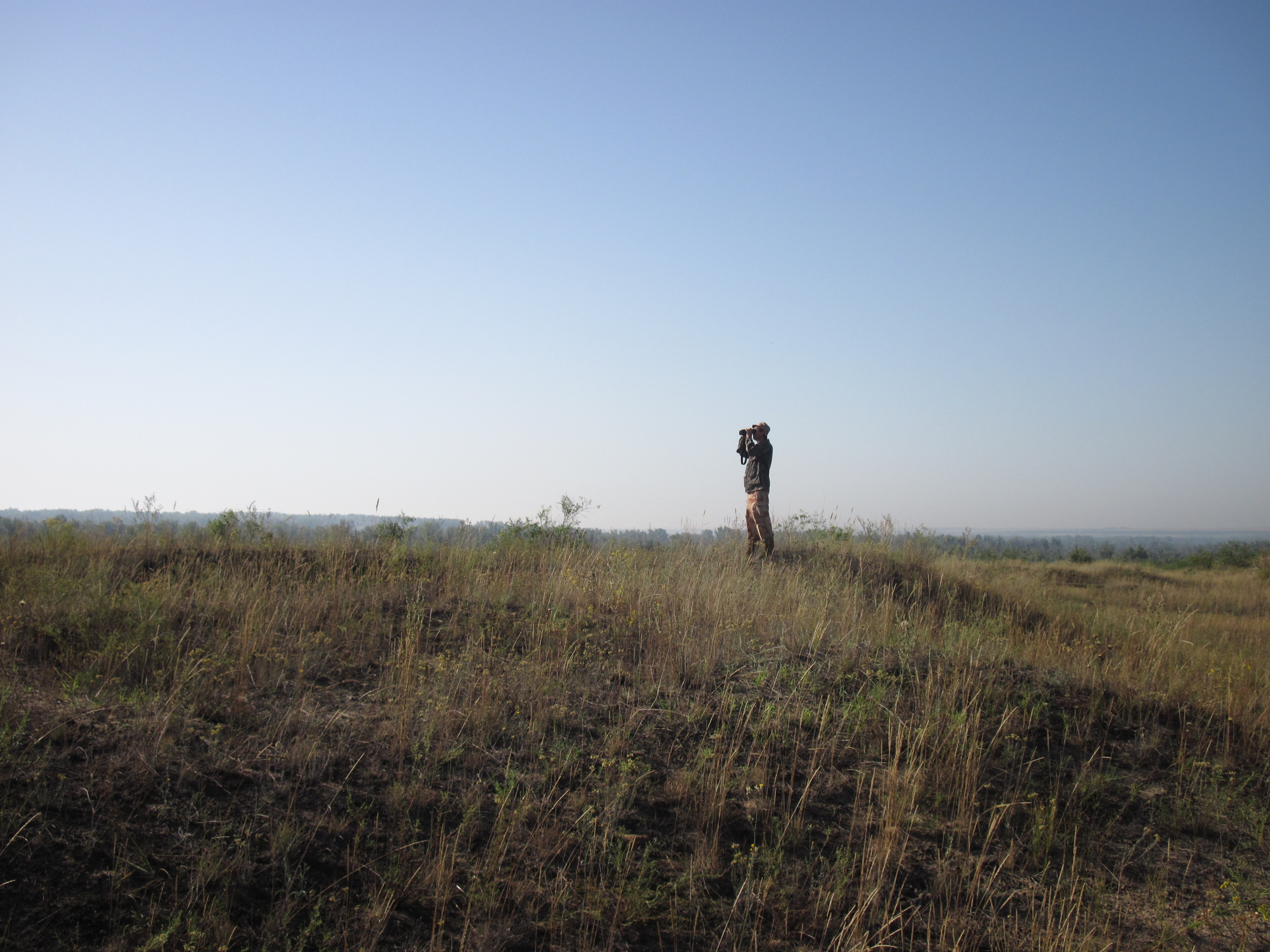
- Grassland on the Triokhizbenskyi Steppe, Luhansk Nature Reserve

- Location within Ukraine
- Location: Luhansk Oblast, Ukraine
- Nearest city: Luhansk
- Coordinates: 48°45′06″N 39°22′32″E
- Area: 8,000 hectares (19,768 acres; 80 km^{2}; 31 sq mi)
- Established: 1968
- Governing body: National Academy of Sciences of Ukraine
- Website: https://web.archive.org/web/20131014182751/ http://zapovednik.lg.ua/?language=uk

Luhansk Nature Reserve (Ukrainian: Луганський природний заповідник) is an administrative collection of four individual national nature reserves of Ukraine. It is located in Luhansk Oblast, the easternmost province of Ukraine, the Luhansk reserves were affected by hostilities in the area in 2014. Originally established as a strict reserve for conservation and scientific study, public access is prohibited. The four components each exhibit a different aspect of the steppe ecology of eastern Ukraine.

The four sectors are:

- Stanytsia-Luhanska Reserve. Floodplain forest-steppe with some meadow steppe. (498 hectares)
- Provallia Steppe Nature Reserve. Grassland steppe with forest cover in deep ravines and river cuts. (588 hectares)
- Striltsivskyi Steppe Nature Reserve. Characteristics of grass-fescue-feather grass northern steppe. (1,037 hectares)
- Triokhizbenskyi Steppe Reserve. A subsidiary branch in former Slovianoserbsk and Novoaidar raions. (3,281 hectares)

== See also ==
- Lists of Nature Preserves of Ukraine (class Ia protected areas)
- National Parks of Ukraine (class II protected areas)
