= List of nature reserves of Ukraine =

The nature reserves of Ukraine are protected areas of Ukraine, nature conservation and science researching institutions of state importance that are part of the Nature-Preservation Fund of Ukraine.

== List ==
#	Name	Photo	Location	Website	Area	Year	Description
1	Cape Martian	Cape Martian Reserve	Crimea; 44.5068713°N 34.2508710°E	Reserve: None	240 ha (0.9 sq mi)	1973	The reserve was created to save naturally valuable systems of Cape Martyan in natural state, to protect and to preserve rare species of flora and fauna, and to conduct scientific research.
2	Cheremske	Cheremske Nature Reserve	Volyn Oblast; 51°22′25″N 25°28′40″E	Reserve: None	2,976 ha (11.5 sq mi)	2001	Covers forest and wetlands of the Western Polesia region, in the northwest of the country. The area is one of high biodiversity because of the varied habitat in transitional ecological zones.
3	Crimean	Crimean Nature Reserve	Crimea; 44°40′00″N 34°21′00″E	Reserve: http://zapovednik-crimea.udprf-crimea.com/	44,175 ha (170.6 sq mi)	1991	Located on a portion of the Crimean Mountains, on the south coast of the Crimean Peninsula. It is the largest and oldest nature reserve in Ukraine
3.1	Swan Islands	Swan Islands Nature Reserve	Crimea; 45°52′30″N 33°32′30″E	Reserve:	9,612 ha (37.1 sq mi)	1949	The Swan Islands Reserve protects a series of islands off the northwest coast of the Crimean Peninsula that this an important resting place for migratory birds in the summer and fall, and a nesting place in winter. It is a sub-unit of the Crimean Nature Reserve.
4	Dnieper-Oril	Floodplain of Lake Grobovo	Dnipropetrovsk Oblast; 48°30′43″N 34°47′4″E	Reserve: No URL	3,766 ha (14.5 sq mi)	1990	Located in the center of the country in the valley of the Dnieper River, the reserve protects two river terraces, the first a strip 2 km wide along the left bank of the Dnieper, and the second a higher inland terrance. It also covers a floodplain of the Oril River. 30% of the reserve is water (some of which was backed up during construction of the Dnieper Hydroelectric Station), and 89% of the floodplain land is forest, mostly oak.
5	Drevlians	Dervlyans	Zhytomyr Oblast; 51°12′10″N 29°4′53″E	Reserve:	66,816 ha (258.0 sq mi)	2009	follows along the Uzh River in the Polesia region of north-central Ukraine. Created to protect representative forests and wetlands of the Polesia region, the area experienced contamination from the Chernobyl disaster. The site is 80 km due west of Chernobyl.
6	Gorgany	Gorgany Nature Reserve	Ivano-Frankivsk Oblast; 48°27′09″N 24°14′00″E	Reserve:	5,344 ha (20.6 sq mi)	1996	Covers a part of the Gorgany mountain range of the Outer Eastern Carpatians in southwest Ukraine. The reserve is 46% old-growth forest, one of the last and largest such stands in Europe.
7	Kaniv	Kaniv Nature Reserve	Cherkasy Oblast; 49°44′40″N 31°27′21″E	Reserve:	2,027 ha (7.8 sq mi)	1923	Covers a portion of the right bank of the Dnieper River, and two floodplain islands in the river itself. The reserve is in the center of Ukraine, along the northeast edge of the Dnieper Upland. It was created to protect valuable forest-steppe and floodplain habitat. The site is known for an abundance of archaeological sites left by cultures back to the Paleolithic.
8	Karadag	Karadag Nature Reserve	Crimea; 44°56′09″N 35°13′59″E	Reserve:	2,874 ha (11.1 sq mi)	1979	Covers a portion of the southeast coast of the Crimean peninsula. Encompassing mountains, forest-steppe, shoreline and marine areas, Karadag is an area of high biodiversity and the subject of much scientific study throughout the past 100 years. It supports a high number of Crimea's endemic species, and important bird colonies.
9	Kazantyp	Kazantypskyi Nature Reserve	Crimea; 45.4616°N 35.8434°E	Reserve: None	4,500 ha (17.4 sq mi)	1998	Includes both territory of Cape Kazantyp and coast-aquatic-complex, on the Kerch Peninsula.
10	Luhansk	Luhansk Nature Reserve	Luhansk Oblast; 48°45′06″N 39°22′32″E	Reserve: None	8,000 ha (30.9 sq mi)	1968	Luhansk Nature Reserve is an administrative collection of four individual national nature reserves of Ukraine. Located in Luhansk Oblast, the easternmost province of Ukraine, the Luhansk reserves were affected by hostilities in the area in 2014. Originally established as a strict reserve for conservation and scientific study, public access is prohibited. The four components each exhibit a different aspect of the steppe ecology of eastern Ukraine. The reserve consists of four sub-units: Stanytsia-Luhanska, Provallia Steppe, Striltsivskyi Steppe and Triokhizbenskyi Steppe.
10.1	Provallia Steppe	Provallya Steppe Nature Reserve	Luhansk Oblast; 48°09′01″N 39°51′29″E	Reserve:	588 ha (2.3 sq mi)	1975	Covers two tracts of representative steppe on the eastern Ukrainian border with Russia. As of 2014, the reserve was no longer under the control of the Ukrainian government. It is a sub-unit of Luhansk Nature Reserve.
10.2	Stanytsia-Luhanska	Stanichno-Luhansk Reserve	Luhansk Oblast; 48°45′25″N 39°21′30″E	Reserve:	498 ha (1.9 sq mi)	1968	Covers a portion of the left bank of the Donets River floodplain. The reserve is about 30 km north of Luhansk, near the town of Stanytsia Luhanska. It is a sub-unit of Luhansk Nature Reserve.
10.3	Striltsevskyi Steppe	Striltsevsky Steppe Nature Reserve	Luhansk Oblast; 49°17′59″N 40°5′46″E	Reserve:	1,037 ha (4.0 sq mi)	1948	Covers representative steppe habitat in eastern Ukraine. The site has been a nature reserve since 1931, providing scientists with a long history of study of steppe ecological processes. It is known for its population of European Marmot. It is a sub-unit of Luhansk Nature Reserve.
11	Medobory	Medobory Nature Reserve	Ternopil Oblast; 49°12′00″N 26°10′00″E	Reserve:	10,521 ha (40.6 sq mi)	1990	Located in the Podolian Upland in the western part of the country. It protects a representative portion of the "Tovtry" region, known for rocky limestone ridges.
12	Michael's Virgin Land	Michael's Virgin Land Nature Reserve	Sumy Oblast; 50°55′N 34°45′E	Reserve: None	883 ha (3.4 sq mi)	2009	Covers meadow-steppe and forest-steppe in the northeast of Ukraine near the border with Russia. It exhibits plants found in both northern and southern steppes. First created as a reserve in 1928, it was expanded over the years and formally upgraded to a national reserve in 2009.
13	Opuk	Opuksky Nature Reserve	Crimea; 45°01′50″N 36°11′10″E	Reserve:	1,592 ha (6.1 sq mi)	1998	Located on the southern coast of the Kerch Peninsula on the Black Sea. It is centered on a limestone massif (Mount Opuk) rising from the kerch plains, and a salt lake (Lake Koiaske). The site is a Ramsar Wetland of International Importance.
14	Polissia	Polissya Nature Reserve	Zhytomyr Oblast; 51°32′05″N 28°06′20″E	Reserve:	20,104 ha (77.6 sq mi)	1968	Dedicated to the conservation and scientific study of representative woodland marshes of the Pinsk Marshes in the Polesia region.
15	Rivne	Rivne Nature Reserve	Rivne Oblast; 51.3944°N 26.8472°E	Reserve:	42,289 ha (163.3 sq mi)	2003	This is the largest area Ukraine has taken under protection, and the best preserved area of bog massifs. The reserve was created to preserve the natural state of typical and unique natural complexes of the Ukraine Polissya. As a result of Ukraine's geographical position, the reserve belongs to the Volyn Polesia zone of mixed forests.
16	Ukrainian Steppe	Ukrainian Steppe Nature Reserve	Donetsk Oblast; 47°06′N 38°00′E	Reserve:	2,768 ha (10.7 sq mi)	1961	Protects a collection of primitive steppe tracts in Donetsk Oblast region of the Ukrainian southeast. Each tract is a different sub-type of Ukrainian steppe.
16.1	Chalk Flora	Chalk Flora Nature Reserve	Donetsk Oblast; 48°52′23″N 37°53′09″E	Reserve:	1,134 ha (4.4 sq mi)	1988	Lies on open chalk slopes of the riverine hills along the Donets River. The ridge is about 50–70 meters above the surrounding territory, and steep - up to 70 degrees. It is a sub-unit of the Ukrainian Steppe Nature Reserve.
17	Yalta Mountain-Forest	Yalta Mountain-Forest Nature Reserve	Crimea; 44°27′29″N 34°05′24″E	Reserve:	14,523 ha (56.1 sq mi)	1973	Covers the southwestern ranges of the Crimean Mountains, along the south coast of the Crimean Peninsula.
18	Yelanets Steppe	Yelanets Steppe Nature Reserve	Mykolaiv Oblast; 47°38′05″N 31°54′30″E	Reserve:	1,675.7 ha (6.5 sq mi)	1996	Covers a section of the largest virgin steppe tract in the Northern Black Sea Coast area. It is the only steppe reserve in Right-bank Ukraine (the area on the west side of the Dnieper River).

== See also ==
- Categories of protected areas of Ukraine
- Emerald Network of Ukraine
- National parks of Ukraine
