= Dnieper–Oril Nature Reserve =

Nature reserve in Dnipropetrovsk Oblast, Ukraine

- IUCN category Ia (strict nature reserve)
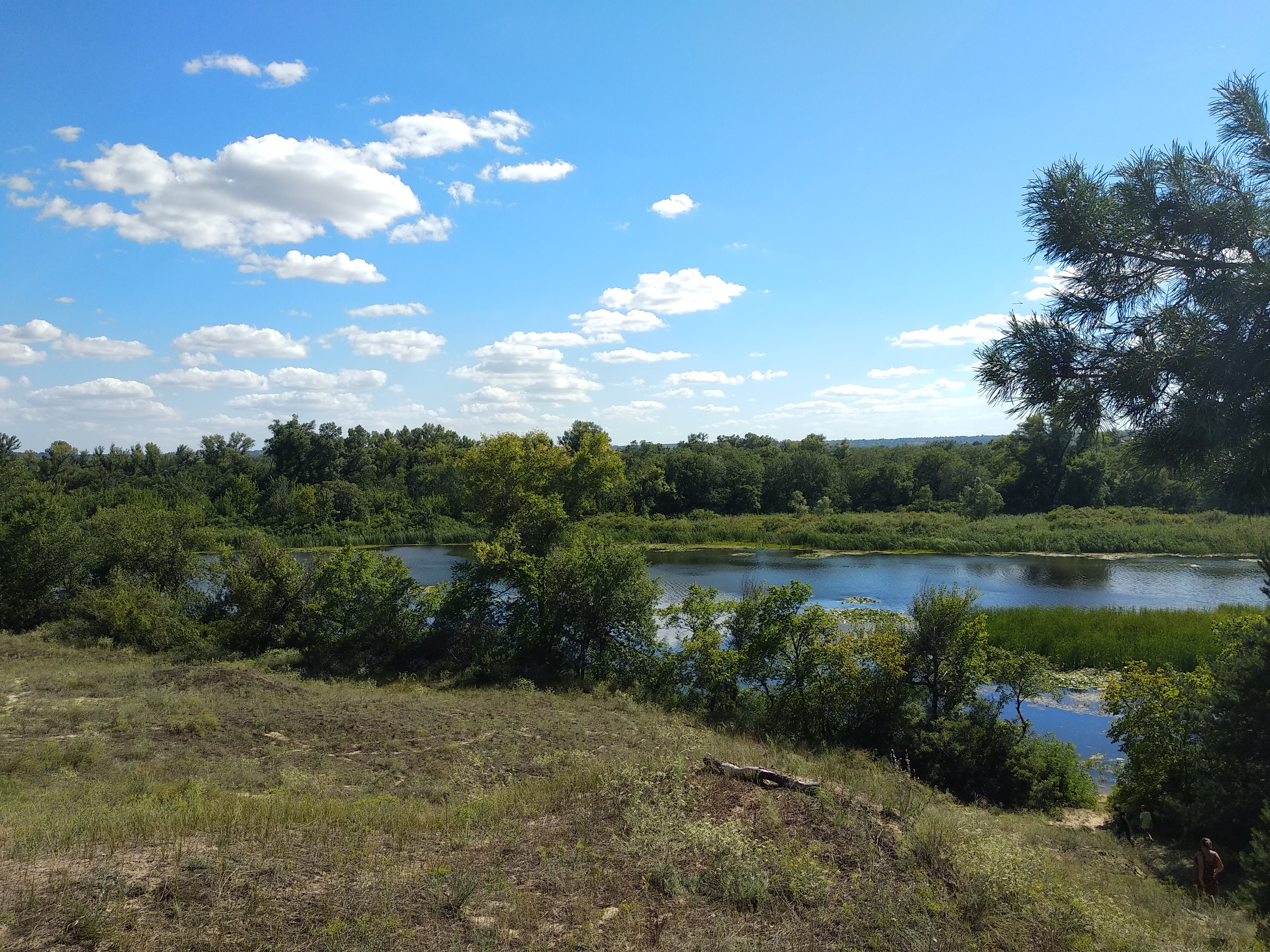
- Floodplain of Lake Horbove, in Dnieper–Oril Nature Reserve

- Location within Ukraine
- Location: Ukraine
- Nearest city: Dnipro
- Coordinates: 48°30′43″N 34°47′4″E
- Area: 3,766 hectares (9,310 acres)
- Governing body: State Forestry Committee of Ukraine

Dnieper–Oril Nature Reserve (Ukrainian: Дніпровсько-Орільский природний заповідник) is a strict nature reserve of Ukraine located in the center of the country in the valley of the Dnieper River. Administratively, the reserve is located in Dnipro Raion of Dnipropetrovsk Oblast, Ukraine.

== Topography ==
The reserve protects a portion of the Middle Dnieper River Valley and floodplains of the Oril River. It covers two river terraces, the first a strip 2 km wide along the left bank of the Dnieper and the second a higher inland terrance. The construction of the Dnieper Hydroelectric Station in the 1940s raised water levels 2 meters in the boundaries, affecting the character of floodplains.

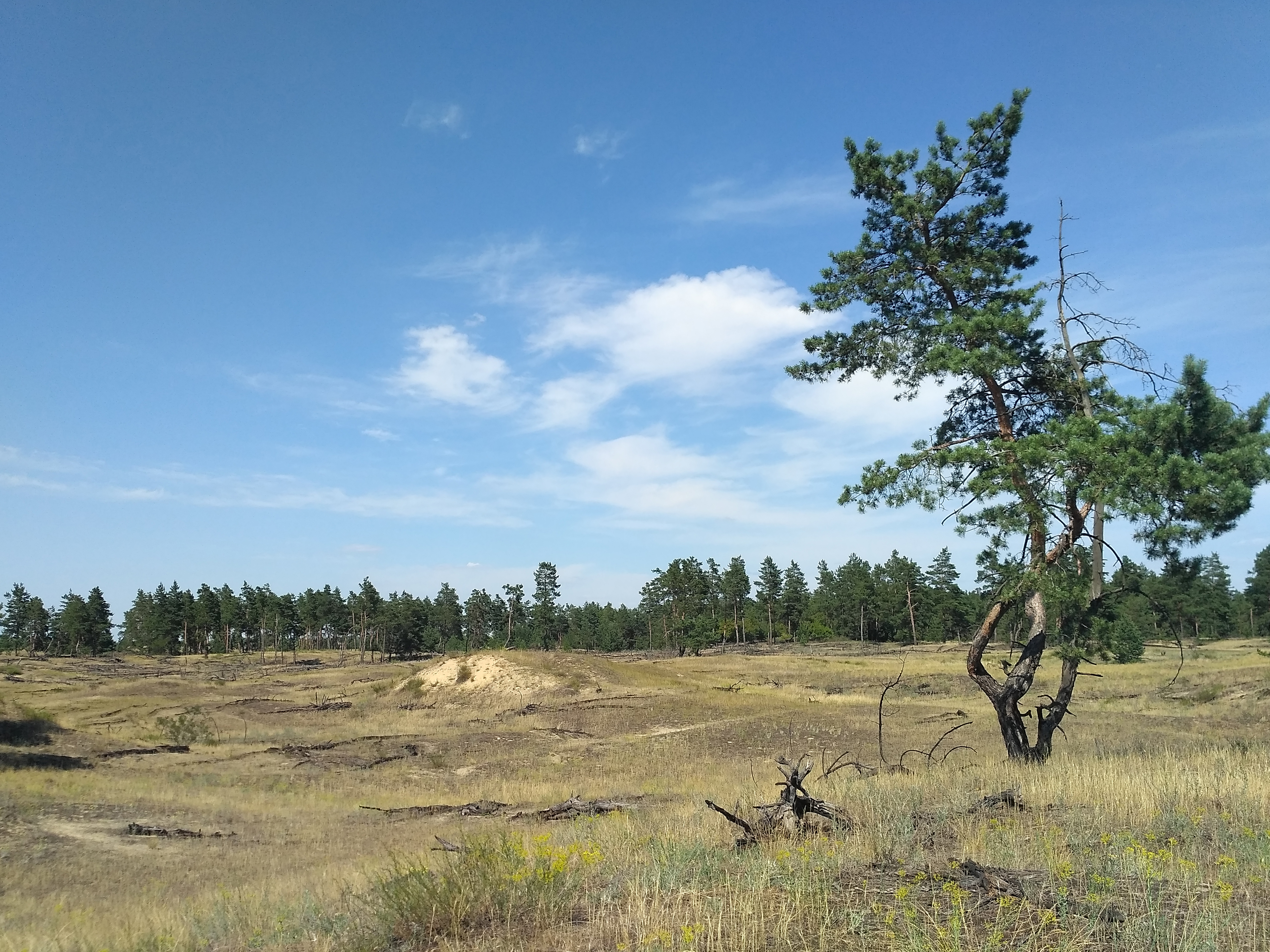
Higher terrace in Dnieper-Oril Reserve

== Climate and ecoregion ==
The climate of Dnieper-Oril is a humid continental climate, warm summer (Köppen climate classification (Dfb)). This climate is characterized by large seasonal temperature differentials and a warm summer (at least four months averaging over 10 °C (50 °F), but no month averaging over 22 °C (72 °F).

The reserve is located in the Pontic–Caspian steppe ecoregion, a region that covers an expanse of grasslands stretching from the northern shores of the Black Sea to western Kazakhstan.

== Flora and fauna ==
The reserve is 30% water, and the floodplain are 89% covered with forests, much of which is oak. The site is a Ramsar Wetland of International Importance.

== Public use ==
As a strict nature reserve, Dnieper–Oril's primary purpose is protection of nature and scientific study. Public access is limited: mass recreation and construction of facilities is prohibited as are hunting and fishing. Reserve staff conduct ecological excursions and educational sessions for local school children, and the scientific department hosts visiting researchers.

== See also ==
- Lists of Nature Preserves of Ukraine (class Ia protected areas)
- National Parks of Ukraine (class II protected areas)
