= Michael's Virgin Land Nature Reserve =

Nature reserve in Ukraine

- Ukrainian: Михайлівська цілина
- IUCN category Ia (strict nature reserve)
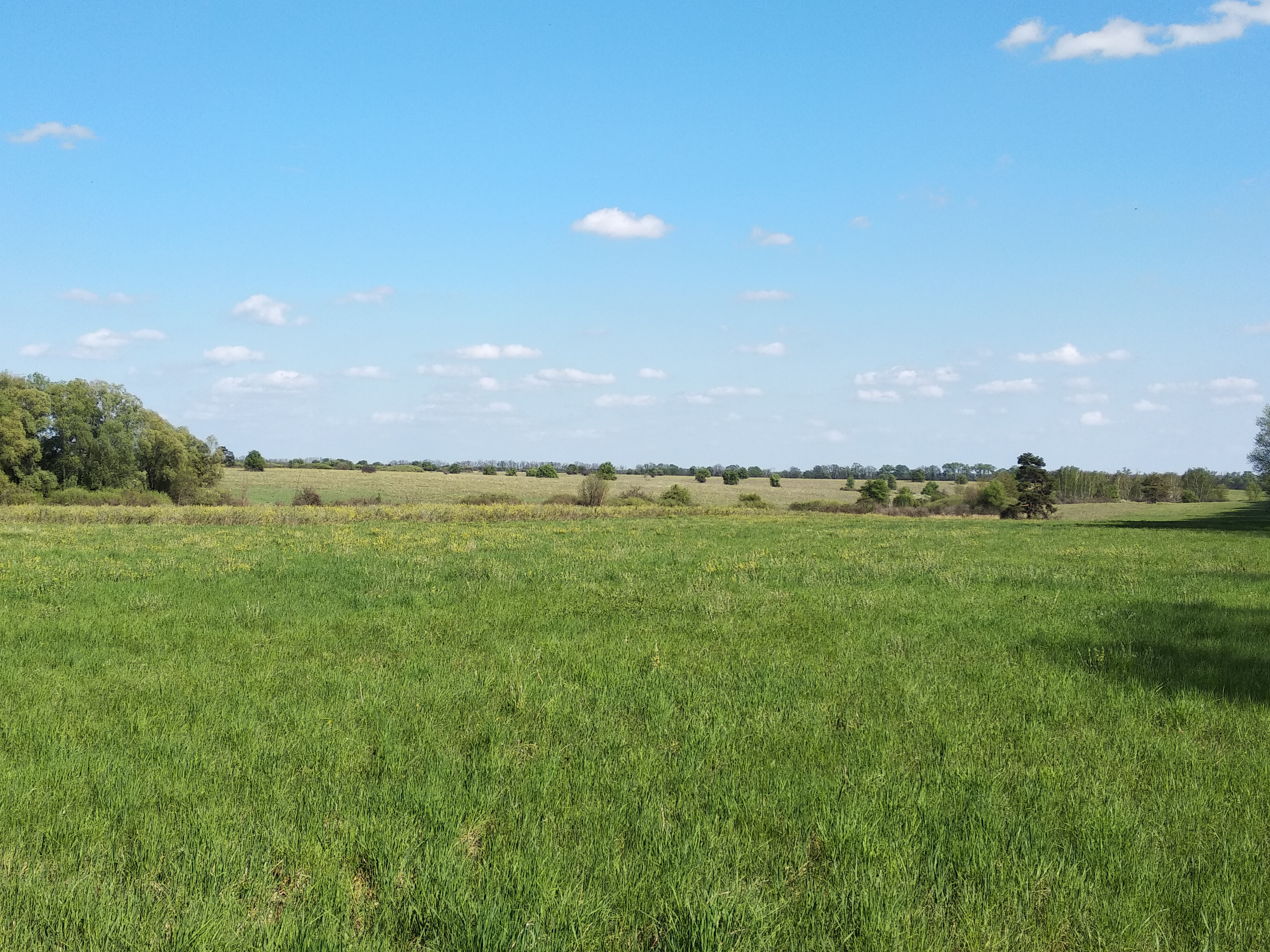
- Michael's Virgin Land Nature Reserve

- Location within Ukraine
- Location: Sumy Oblast
- Nearest city: Sumy
- Coordinates: 50°55′N 34°45′E
- Area: 883 hectares (2,182 acres; 9 km^{2}; 3 sq mi)
- Established: 2009
- Governing body: Ministry of Ecology and Natural Resources (Ukraine)

The Michael's Virgin Land Nature Reserve (Ukrainian: Природний заповідник «Михайлівська цілина», romanized: 'Mykhailivs'ka tsilyna') is a protected nature reserve of Ukraine that covers meadow-steppe and forest-steppe in the northeast of Ukraine near the border with Russia. It exhibits plants found in both northern and southern steppes. First created as a reserve in 1928, it was expanded over the years and formally upgraded to a national reserve in 2009. The reserve is in the administrative districts of Lebedyn and Nedryhailiv of Sumy Oblast.

== Topography ==
The reserve is relatively flat in the uplands of northeast Ukraine, in the watershed of the Sula River and the Grun River. It is the remnant of what was formerly a large virgin grassland. The main body of the reserve is in the middle of the district, with several small satellite sites of 40-100 hectares each scattered around the vicinity to protect other remnant meadow-steppe plots.

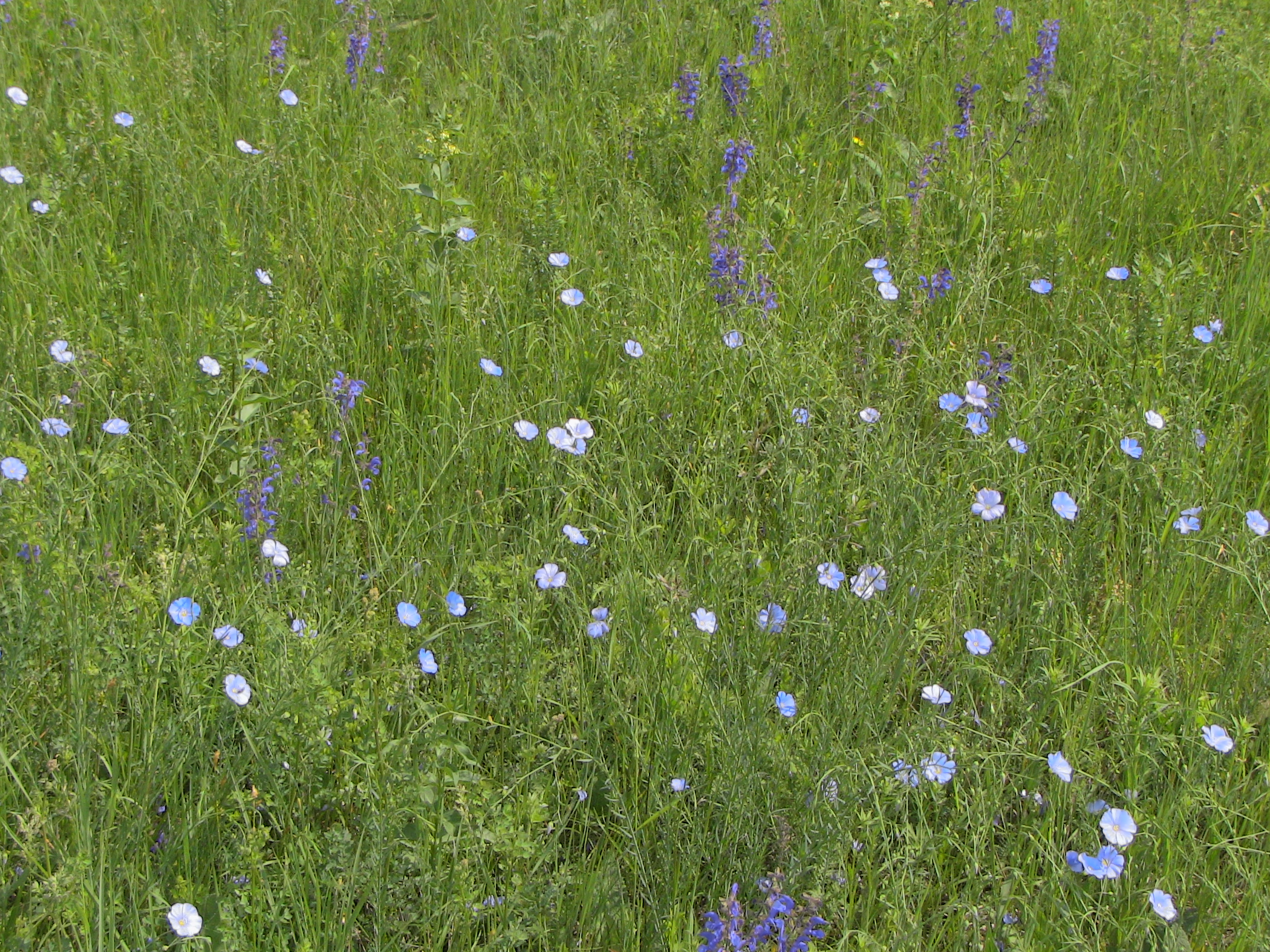
Onion grass and wildflowers in Michael's Reserve

== Climate and ecoregion ==
The climate of the reserve is Humid continental climate, warm summer (Köppen climate classification (Dfb)). This climate is characterized by large seasonal temperature differentials and a warm summer (at least four months averaging over 10 °C (50 °F), but no month averaging over 22 °C (72 °F).

The reserve is located in the East European forest steppe ecoregion, a transition zone between the broadleaf forests of the north and the grasslands to the south.. This ecoregion is characterized by a mosaic of forests, steppe, and riverine wetlands.

== Flora and fauna ==
The reserve is meadow-steppe and forest steppe, known for wildflowers, feathergrass, fescue and other grasses. Many parts are recovering from the influences of humans, particularly hay-making, and are the subject of scientific study of the processes of rebuilding wild plant and animal communities.

== Public use ==
As a strict nature reserve, Michael's Reserve's primary purpose is protection of nature and scientific study. Public access is limited: mass recreation and construction of facilities is prohibited as are hunting and fishing.

== See also ==
- Lists of Nature Preserves of Ukraine (class Ia protected areas)
- National Parks of Ukraine (class II protected areas)
