= Chalk Flora Nature Reserve =

Nature reserve in Donetsk Oblast, Ukraine

- Ukrainian: Крейдова флора (заповідник)
- IUCN category Ia (strict nature reserve)
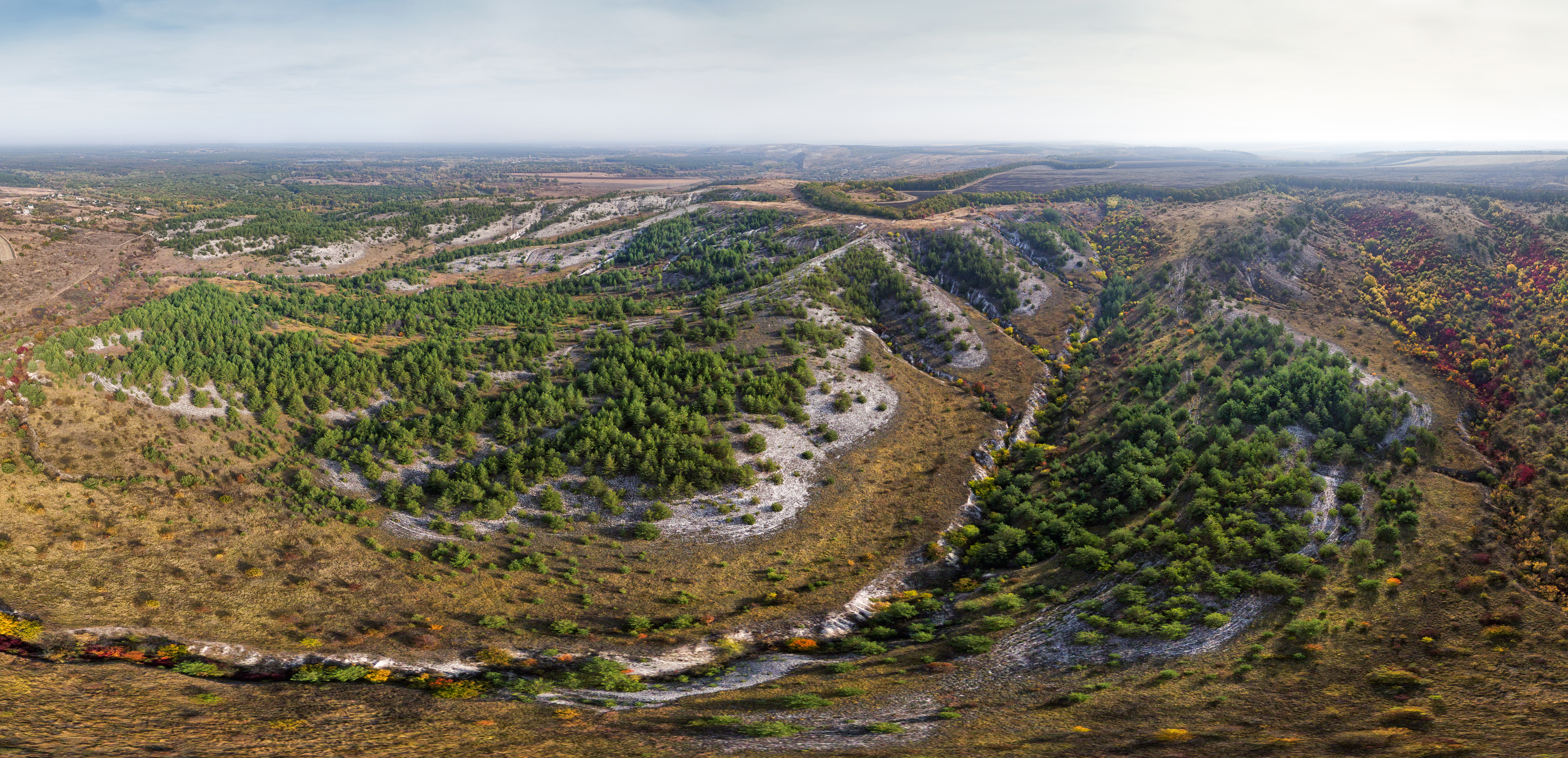
- Chalk Flora Nature Reserve

- Location within Ukraine
- Location: Donetsk Oblast, Kramatorsk Raion
- Coordinates: 48°52′23″N 37°53′09″E
- Area: 1,134 hectares (2,802 acres; 11 km^{2}; 4 sq mi)
- Established: 1988
- Governing body: National Academy of Sciences of Ukraine
- Website: http://pryroda.in.ua/creidoshyl/pro-zapovidnyk

Chalk Flora Nature Reserve (Ukrainian: Крейдова флора (заповідник)) (also: Cretaceous Flora) is a protected nature reserve of Ukraine that lies on open chalk slopes of the riverine hills along the Donets River. The reserve is in the Kramatorsk Raion of Donetsk Oblast. it is a sub-unit of the Ukrainian Steppe Nature Reserve, with an area of 1,134 hectares.

== Topography ==
The ridge is about 50-70 meters above the surrounding territory, and steep - up to 70 degrees. The area has been preserved in large part because the land is not suitable for agriculture.

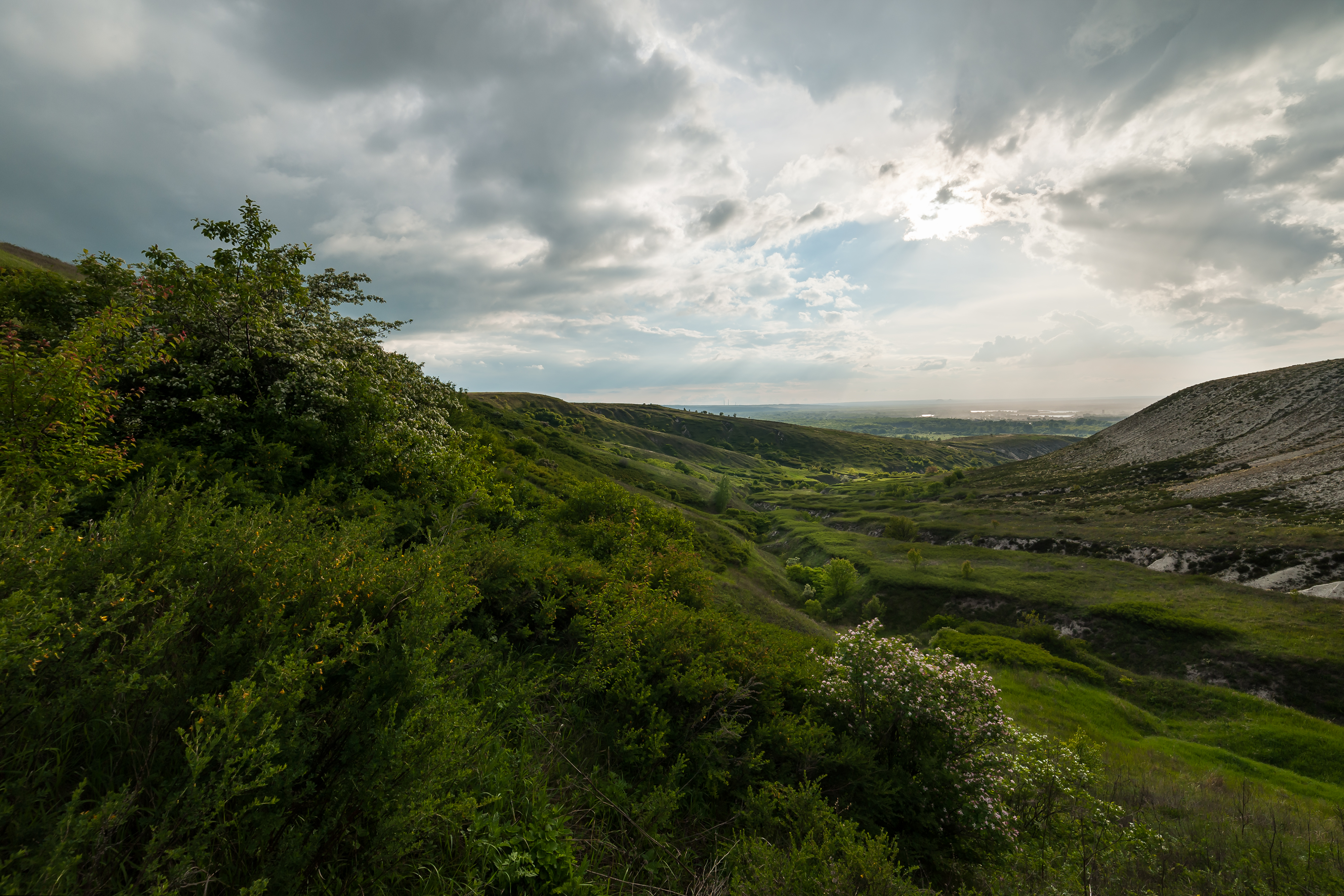
Vegetation on limestone soils in the reserve

== Climate and ecoregion ==
The climate of Chalk Flora NR is Humid continental climate, warm summer (Köppen climate classification (Dfb)). This climate is characterized by large seasonal temperature differentials and a warm summer (at least four months averaging over 10 °C (50 °F), but no month averaging over 22 °C (72 °F).

== Flora and fauna ==
About a third of the reserve territory is forest, surrounded by steppe. The forests are typically of chalk pine or birch. The steppe is of the multi-grass variety found in the mid-Ukrainian regions, on chalky soils and sow-hummus black soils.

== Public use ==
As a strict nature reserve, Chalk Flora's primary purpose is protection of nature and scientific study. Public access is prohibited.

== See also ==
- Lists of Nature Preserves of Ukraine (class Ia protected areas)
- National Parks of Ukraine (class II protected areas)
