= Provallia Steppe Nature Reserve =

Nature reserve in Ukraine

- Ukrainian: Провальський степ (заповідник)
- IUCN category Ia (strict nature reserve)
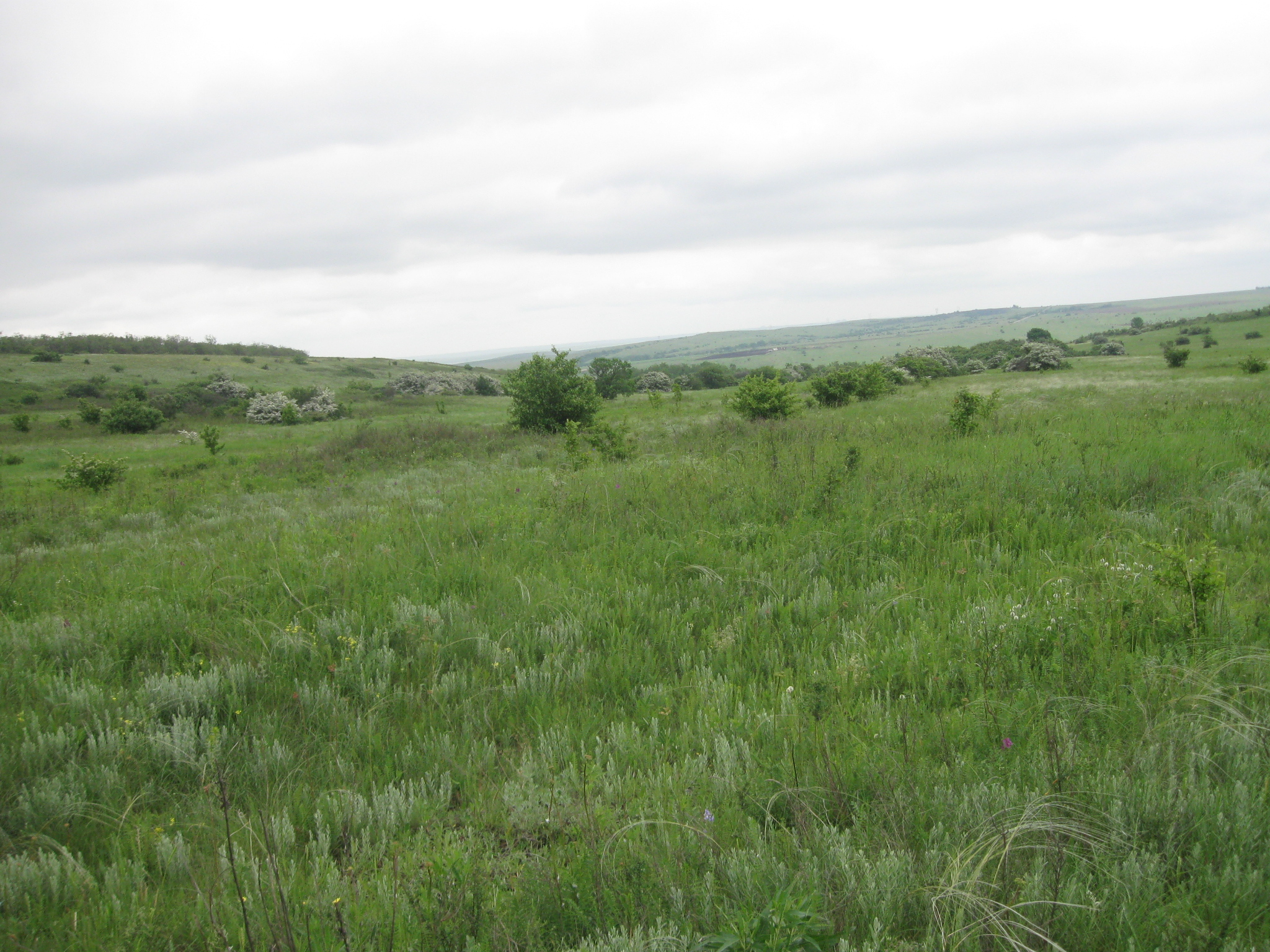
- Provallia Steppe

- Location within Ukraine
- Location: Luhansk Oblast, Sverdlovsk Raion
- Nearest city: Lugansk
- Coordinates: 48°09′01″N 39°51′29″E
- Area: 588 hectares (1,453 acres; 6 km^{2}; 2 sq mi)
- Established: 1975
- Website: http://pryroda.in.ua/lugansk-region/pryrodni-zapovidnyky/filial-provalskyy-step-luhanskyy-pryrodnyy-zapovidnyk/

The Provallia Steppe Nature Reserve (Ukrainian: Провальський степ (заповідник)) is a protected nature reserve of Ukraine that covers two tracts of representative steppe on the eastern Ukrainian border with Russia. As of 2014, the reserve was no longer under the control of the Ukrainian government. The reserve is in the administrative district of Sverdlovsk Raion in Luhansk Oblast

== Topography ==
The reserve is organized in two separate tracts:

- Kalinivska. Laced with shallow streams (less than 1 meter in depth), and rocky sections. (300 ha)
- Hrushevskaya. Centered on the Hrushevska Gorge, and a large pond (Cataar). (288 ha)

The reserve is immediately on the eastern border of Ukraine with Russia. Geologically, it is on the northern edge of the Donetsk folded country, characterized by sandstone, limestone, and sandy shales of the Carboniferous Period. The terrain is ridge-hollow, with elevations 150-230 meters above sea level.

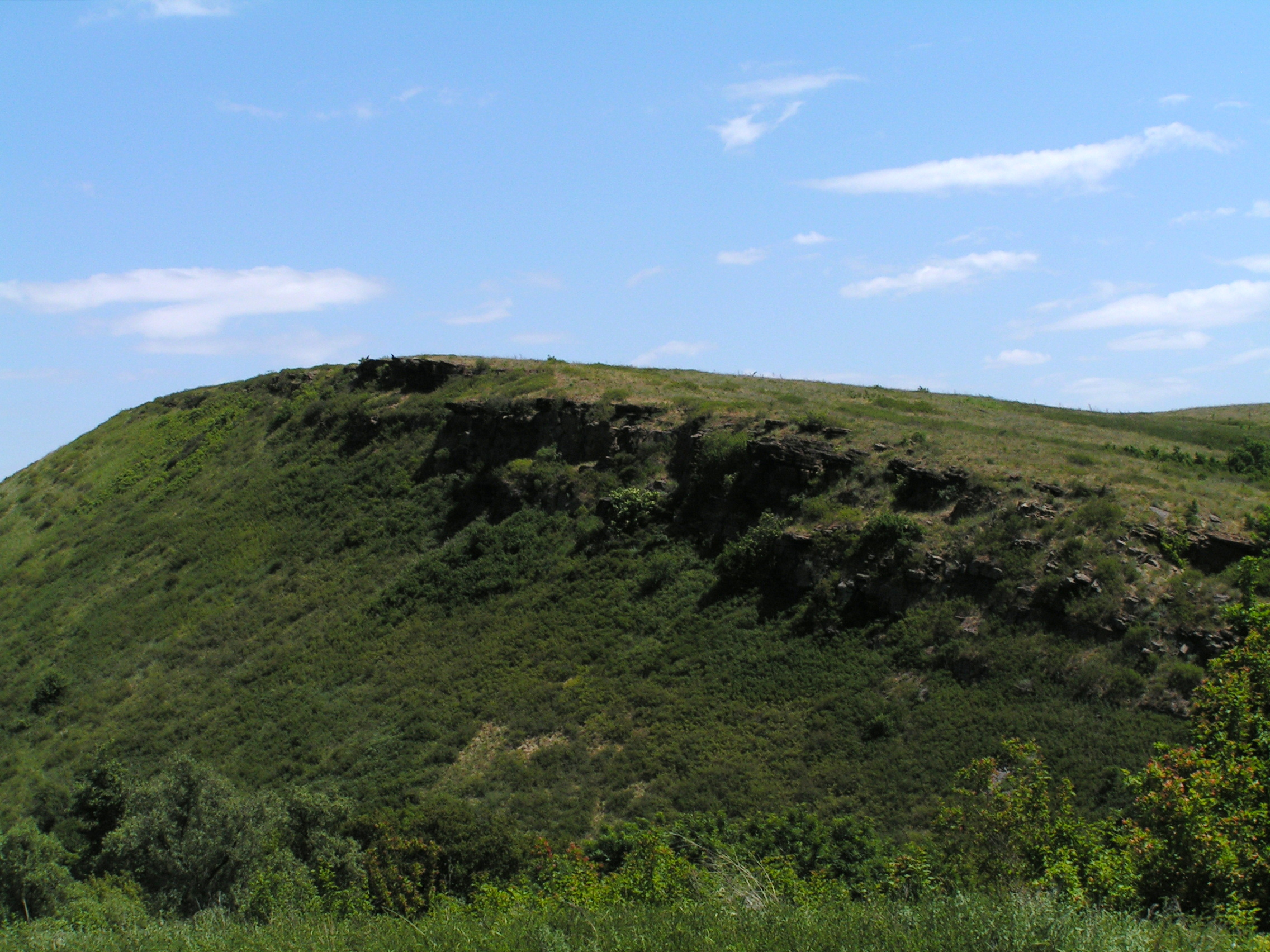
Rocky slopes in the reserve

== Climate and ecoregion ==
The climate of the Provallia Steppe reserve is Humid continental climate, warm summer (Köppen climate classification (Dfb)). This climate is characterized by large seasonal temperature differentials and a warm summer (at least four months averaging over 10 °C (50 °F), but no month averaging over 22 °C (72 °F).

The reserve is located in the Pontic–Caspian steppe ecoregion, a region that covers an expanse of grasslands stretching from the northern shores of the Black Sea to western Kazakhstan.

== Flora and fauna ==
Approximately 88% of the site is grassland (steppe), and 12% is forest (mostly in ravines and along rivers).

== Public use ==
As a strict nature reserve, Provallia Steppe's primary purpose is protection of nature and scientific study. There is no public access, and as of 2014 the site was not under government control.

== See also ==
- Lists of Nature Preserves of Ukraine (class Ia protected areas)
- National Parks of Ukraine (class II protected areas)
