= Yelanets Steppe Nature Reserve =

Nature reserve in Mykolaiv Oblast, Ukraine

- Ukrainian: Природний заповідник «Єланецький степ»
- IUCN category Ia (strict nature reserve)
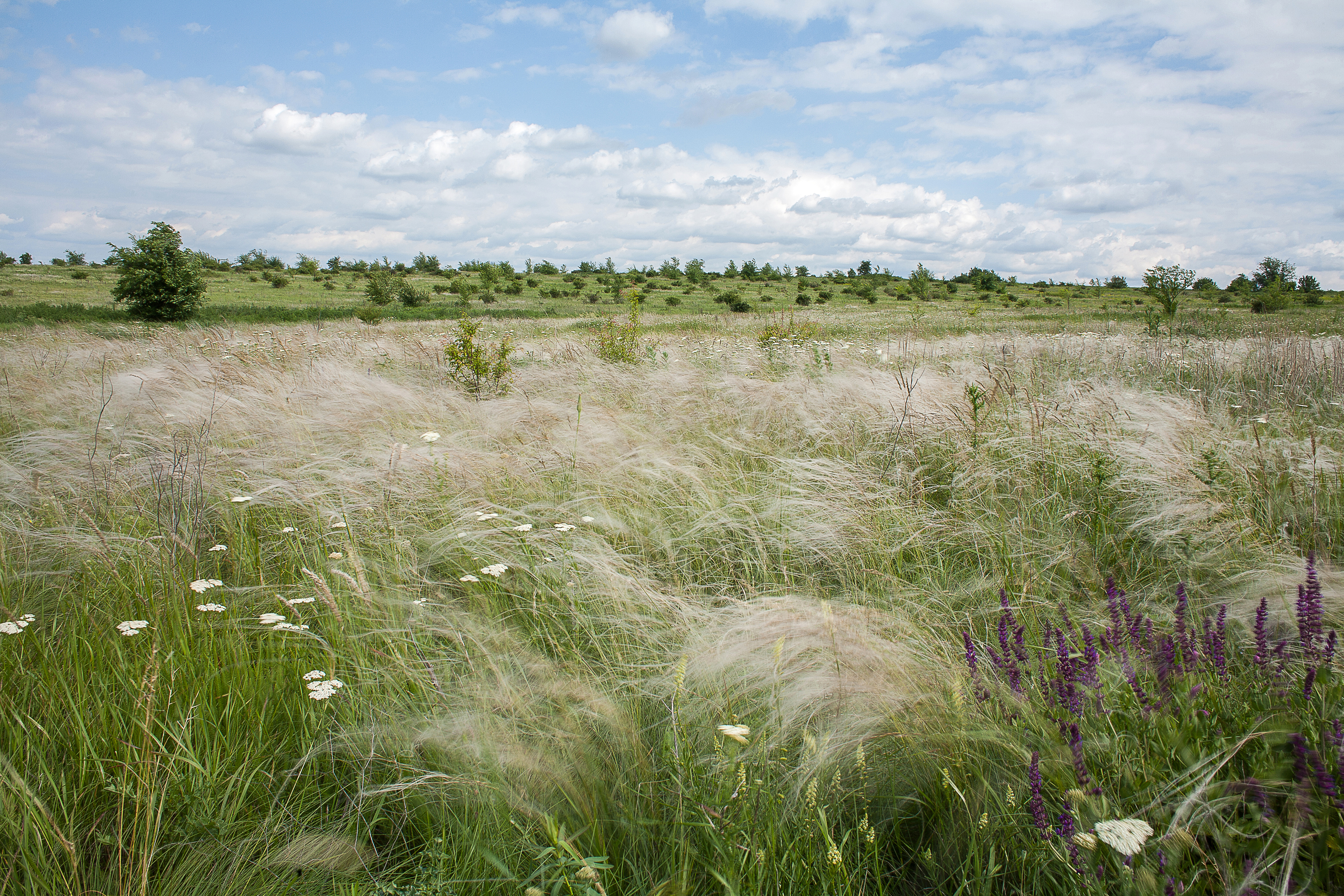
- Yelanets Steppe Nature Reserve

- Location within Ukraine
- Location: Mykolaiv Oblast
- Nearest city: Yelanets
- Coordinates: 47°38′05″N 31°54′30″E
- Area: 1,675.7 hectares (4,141 acres; 17 km^{2}; 6 sq mi)
- Established: 1996
- Governing body: Ministry of Ecology and Natural Resources (Ukraine)
- Website: http://steppe.mk.ua/

The Yelanets Steppe Nature Reserve (Ukrainian: Природний заповідник «Єланецький степ», romanized: Jelanec'kyj step) is a protected nature reserve of Ukraine that covers a section of the largest virgin steppe tract in the Northern Black Sea coast area. It is the only steppe reserve in Right-bank Ukraine (the area on the west side of the Dnieper River). A herd of American bison was introduced and lives within the territory. The reserve is in Mykolaiv Oblast.

== Topography ==
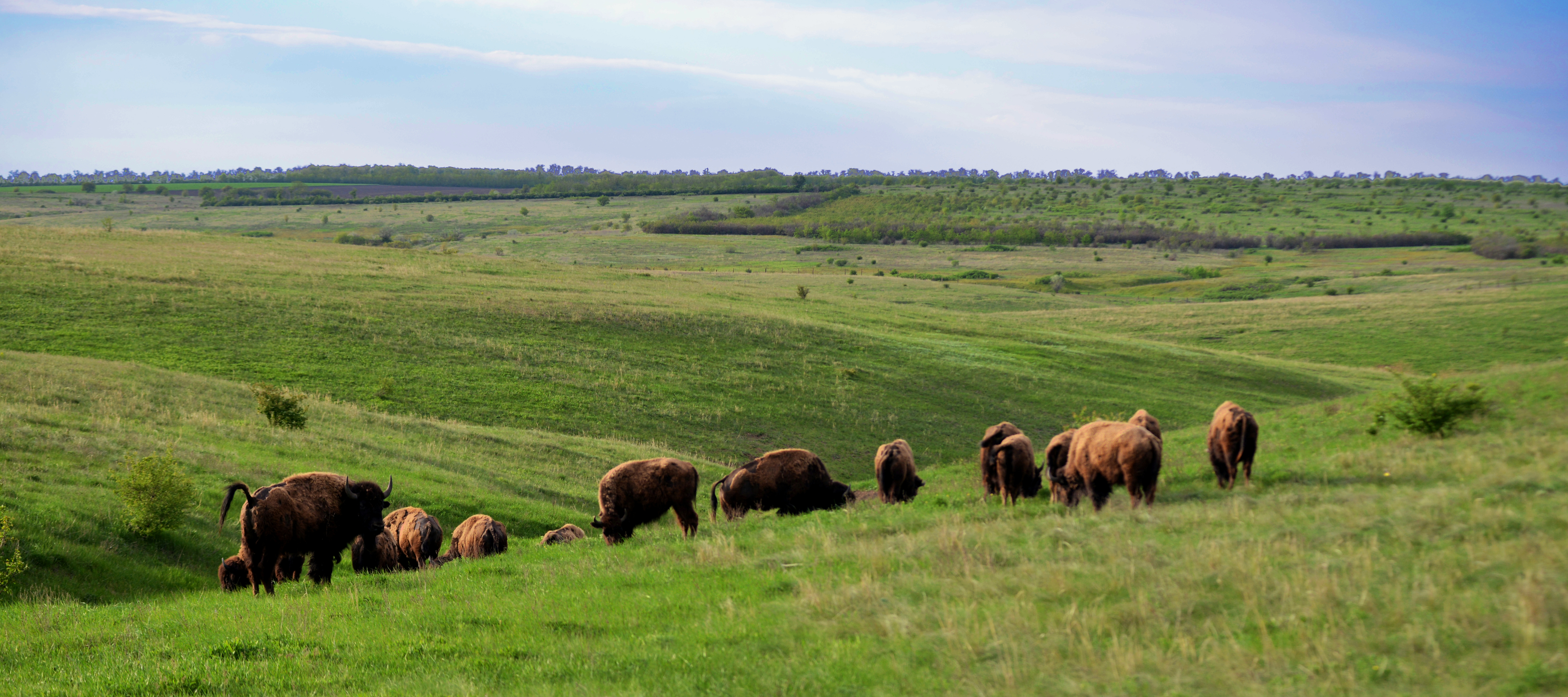
American bisons on the Yelanets Steppe

The reserve is situated on a southern spur of the Dnieper Upland, about 140 km west of the Dnieper River, and 100 km north of the Black Sea coast. The site began with the set-aside of a 300 hectare plot in 1978; it has been periodically added to over the years to total 1,675 ha in 2019. A 1.2 km ecological corridor runs through the middle of the site. The hilly terrain, with cliffs in places, is due to the karst (limestone) underlying the area.

== Climate and ecoregion ==
The official climate designation for the Yelanets Steppe area is "Humid continental climate – warm summer sub-type" (Köppen climate classification Dfb), with large seasonal temperature differentials and a warm summer (at least four months averaging over 10 °C (50 °F), but no month averaging over 22 °C (72 °F). The average temperature in January is −4.5 °C (23.9 °F) and 21 °C (70 °F) in July. Average annual precipitation is 428 mm.

== Flora and fauna ==
The characteristic vegetation of this type of steppe is Festuca valesiaca. About one-third of the site is recovered agricultural land that is being returned to native local steppe. 615 species of vascular plants have been listed on the reserve.

Scientists working in the reserve have recorded 28 species of mammals including red fox, American bison and roe deer, wild boar, and Bobak marmot, 137 of birds, 6 of reptiles, and 5 species of amphibians. During 1970s, cattles, Turkmenian kulan, spotted deer, and mouflon were also kept with bisons within semi-feral condition.

== Public use ==
As a strict nature reserve, Yelanets Steppe 's primary purpose is protection of nature and scientific study. Public access is limited: mass recreation and construction of facilities is prohibited as are hunting and fishing. Park staff lead educational programs for local schoolchildren, and general ecological awareness programs for community. In the 1970 the site featured a 70-hectare "living zoo" enclosure that has since been removed and the animals relocated.

== See also ==
- Lists of Nature Preserves of Ukraine (class Ia protected areas)
- National Parks of Ukraine (class II protected areas)
