= Stanytsia-Luhanska Reserve =

Nature reserve in Luhansk Oblast, Ukraine

- Ukrainian: Станично-Луганський заповідник
- IUCN category Ia (strict nature reserve)
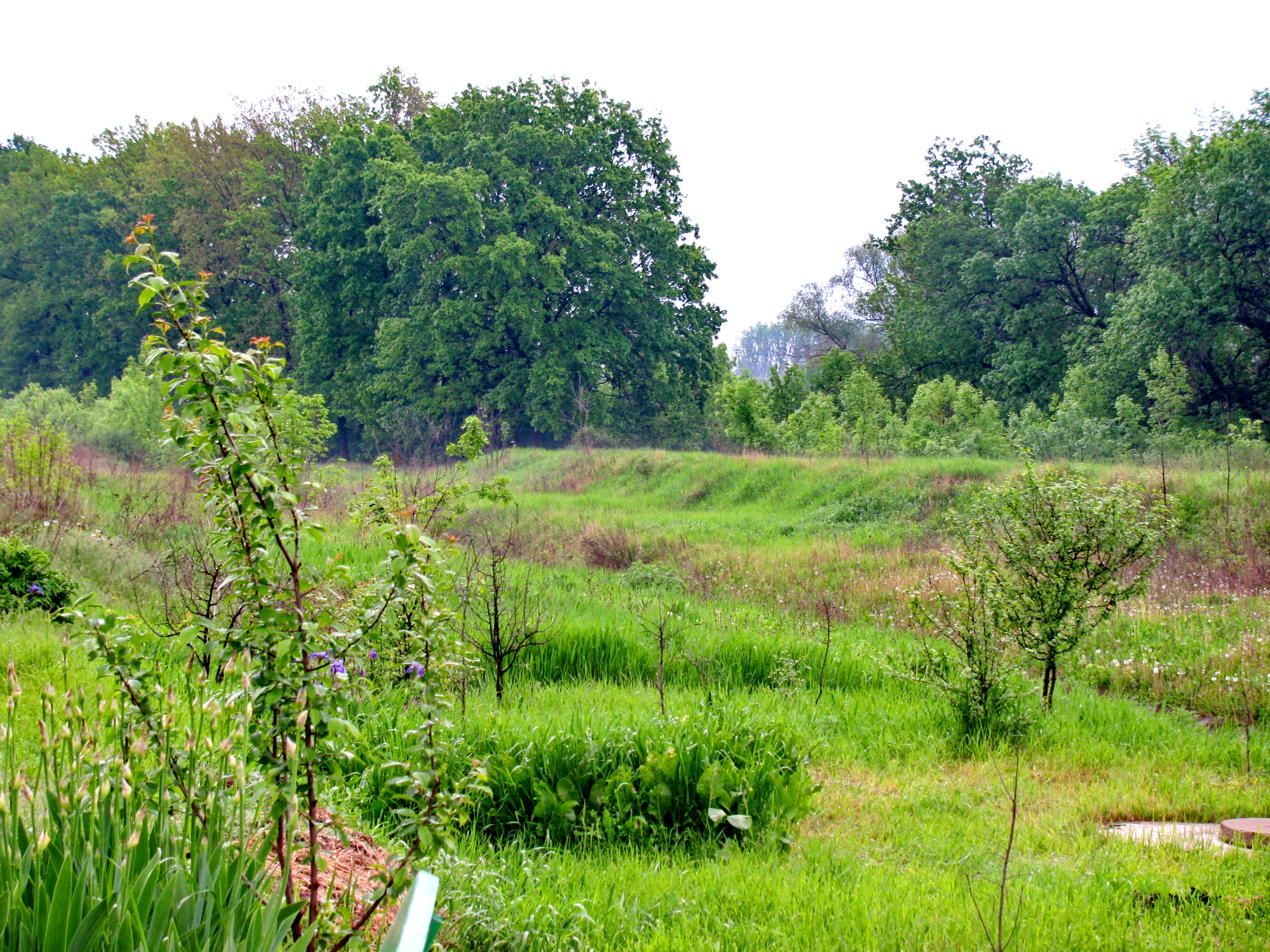
- Stanytsia-Luhanska Reserve

- Location within Ukraine
- Location: Luhansk Oblast, Shchastia Raion
- Nearest city: Stanytsia-Luhanska
- Coordinates: 48°45′25″N 39°21′30″E
- Area: 498 hectares (1,231 acres; 5 km^{2}; 2 sq mi)
- Established: 1968
- Governing body: National Academy of Sciences of Ukraine
- Website: https://lpznanu.wixsite.com/lpznanu/stanica

Stanytsia-Luhanska Reserve (Ukrainian: Станично-Луганський заповідник) is a protected area in Ukraine that covers a portion of the left bank of the Donets River floodplain. It belongs to the Luhansk Nature Reserve. The reserve is about 30 km north of Luhansk, near the town of Stanytsia Luhanska in the administrative district of Shchastia Raion of Luhansk Oblast.

== Topography ==
The site is set back from the Donets River itself, on the terrace supporting a strip of flood lakes about 50 meters above sea level. In the 1990s the lakes in the middle of the reserve were frequently connected to the river by flooding. The soils are chernozym (black soils) on 15–20 meters of alluvium and limestone rocks.

== Climate and ecoregion ==
The official climate designation for the Stanytsia-Luhanska area is "Humid continental climate - warm summer sub-type" (Köppen climate classification Dfb), with large seasonal temperature differentials and a warm summer (at least four months averaging over 10 °C (50 °F), but no month averaging over 22 °C (72 °F). The growing season lasts 200–210 days. The average annual precipitation is 460 mm, but varies from 300-680.

== Flora and fauna ==
The reserve is covered mostly with deciduous forest (70%), meadow-steppe, and floodplain lakes. The lower sandy regions near the river feature willow and poplar; on the terrace are oak forests.

== Public use ==
As a strict nature reserve, Stanytsia-Luhanska Reserve's primary purpose is protection of nature and scientific study. Public access is limited: mass recreation and construction of facilities is prohibited as are hunting and fishing.

== See also ==
- Lists of Nature Preserves of Ukraine (class Ia protected areas)
- National Parks of Ukraine (class II protected areas)
