= Striltsivskyi Steppe Nature Reserve =

Nature reserve in Ukraine

- Ukrainian: Стрільцівський Степ
- IUCN category Ia (strict nature reserve)
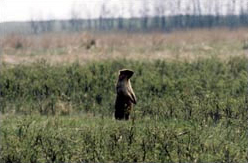
- Striltsivskyi Steppe Nature Reserve

- Location within Ukraine
- Location: Luhansk Oblast, Milove Raion
- Nearest city: Luhansk
- Coordinates: 49°17′59″N 40°05′46″E
- Area: 1,037 hectares (2,562 acres; 10 km^{2}; 4 sq mi)
- Established: 1948
- Governing body: Ministry of Ecology and Natural Resources (Ukraine)
- Website: https://lpznanu.wixsite.com/lpznanu/striltsivka

Striltsivskyi Steppe Nature Reserve (Ukrainian: Стрільцівський Степ) is a protected nature reserve of Ukraine that covers representative steppe habitat in eastern Ukraine. The site has been a nature reserve since 1931, providing scientists with a long history of study of steppe ecological processes. It is known for its population of European Marmot. The reserve is in the administrative district of Milove in Luhansk Oblast Striltsivskyi is administratively a unit of Luhansk Nature Reserve.

== Topography ==
The reserve sits on a southern spur of the middle Russian Highlands, near the border with Russia. The terrain is relatively flat, with elevations of hills rising to 50 meters.

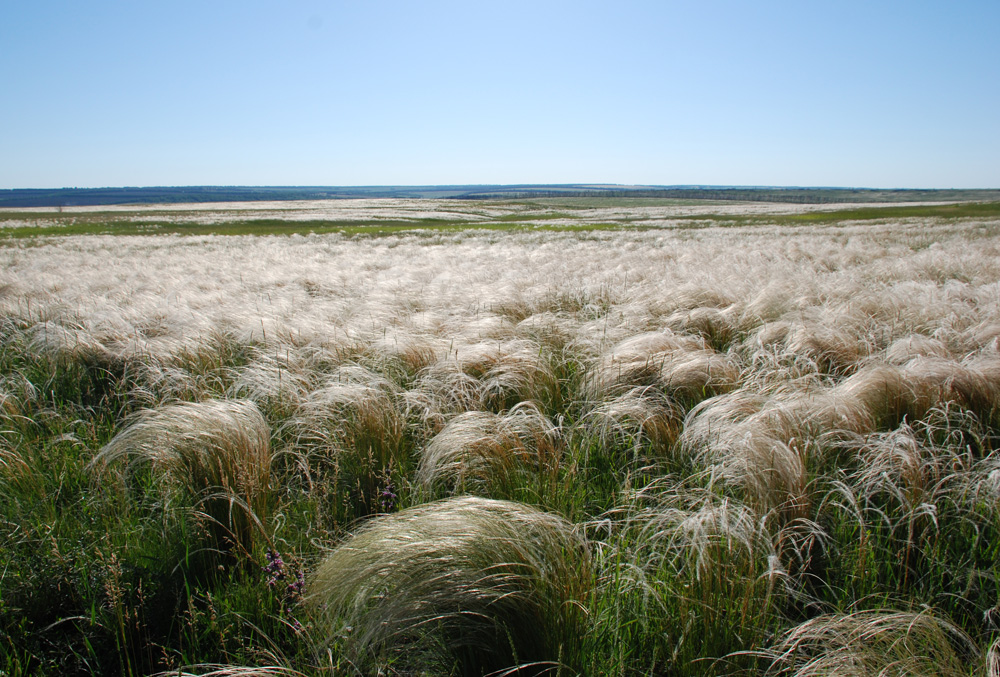
Feather grass (Stipa tirsa) in the Strilsevsky Reserve

== Climate and ecoregion ==
The climate of Striltsivskyi Steppe is Humid continental climate, warm summer (Köppen climate classification (Dfb)). This climate is characterized by large seasonal temperature differentials and a warm summer (at least four months averaging over 10 °C (50 °F), but no month averaging over 22 °C (72 °F). Average temperature in January is −9 °C (16 °F), and 21 °C (70 °F) in July. Annual precipitation varies between 250 and 400 mm per year.

== Flora and fauna ==
The landscape is that of grass-fescue-feather grass northern steppe. The sandy river banks feature willow and poplar, the higher terraces tend towards meadow steppe, and the raised areas support patchworks of oak and mixed deciduous forests. Biodiversity is high; scientists in the reserve have recorded 673 species of vascular plans, and 47 species of mammals.

== Public use ==
As a strict nature reserve, Striltsivskyi's primary purpose is protection of nature and scientific study. Public access is limited: mass recreation and construction of facilities is prohibited as are hunting and fishing.

== See also ==
- Lists of Nature Preserves of Ukraine (class Ia protected areas)
- National Parks of Ukraine (class II protected areas)
