= East European forest steppe =

Terrestrial ecoregion in eastern Europe

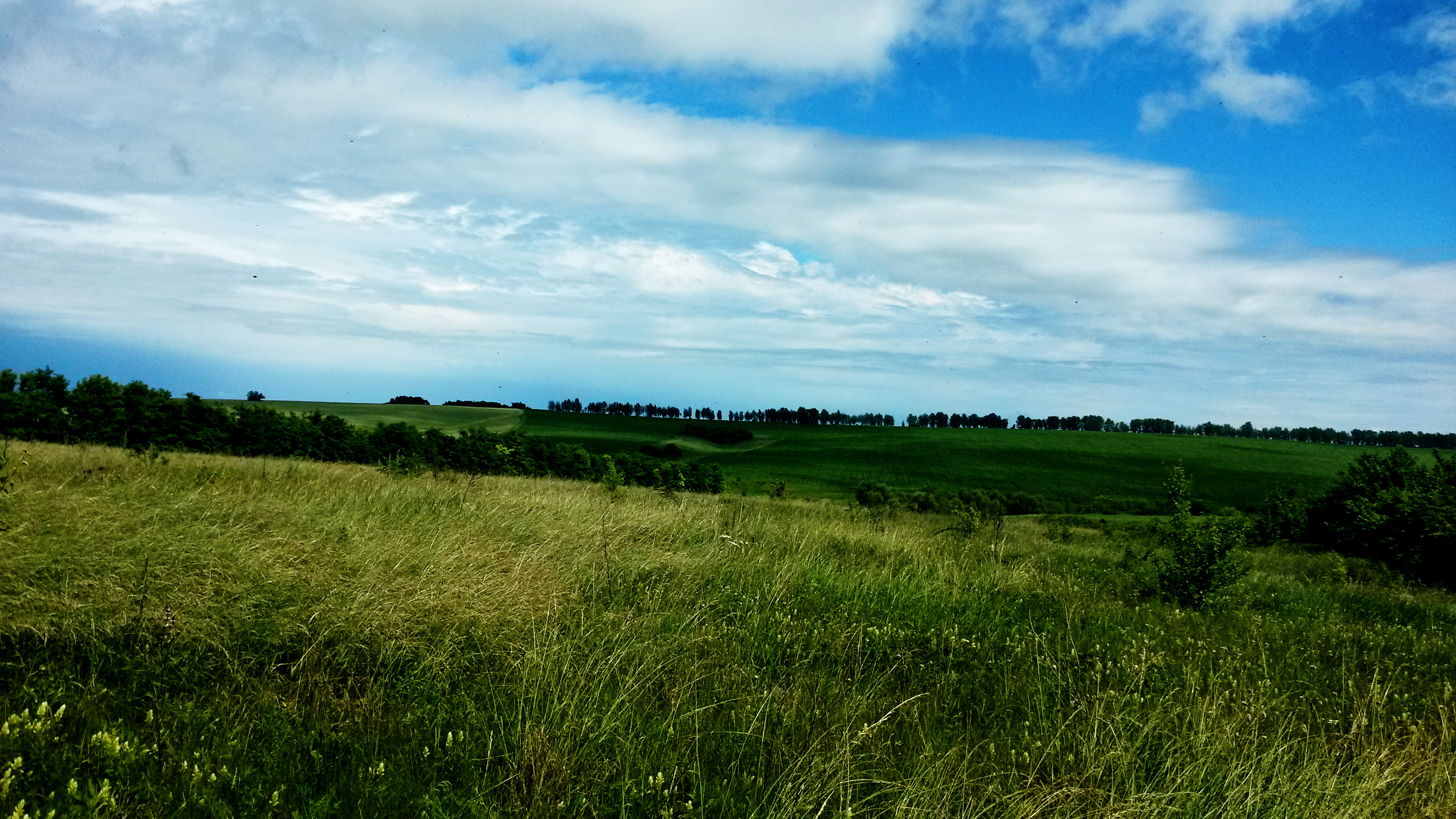
- The Central Black Earth Nature Reserve, an example of forest steppe terrain, in Kursk Oblast, Russia

- Ecoregion territory (in purple)

Ecology
- Realm: Palearctic
- Biome: temperate broadleaf and mixed forests
- Borders: List: Balkan mixed forests; Central European mixed forests; Kazakh forest steppe; Pontic steppe; Sarmatic mixed forests, Urals montane tundra and taiga

Geography
- Area: 727,269 km^{2} (280,800 mi^{2})
- Countries: List: Russia; Ukraine; Moldova; Romania; Bulgaria

Conservation
- Conservation status: Critical/endangered
- Protected: 35,989 km² (5%)

The East European forest steppe ecoregion (WWF ID: PA0419) is a patchwork of broadleaf forest stands and grasslands (steppe) that stretches 2,100 km across Eastern Europe from the Ural Mountains in Ural, through Povolzhye, Central Russia to the middle of Ukraine. There are isolated areas of similar character off the western end in eastern Romania, Moldova, and Bulgaria.

The region forms a transition zone between the temperate forests to the north, and the steppe to the south. The forest-steppe is an area of Russia in which precipitation and evaporation are approximately equal. The ecoregion is in the Palearctic realm, with a Humid Continental climate. According to one definition of its boundaries, it covers 727,269 km^{2} (280,800 sq mi).

== Location and description ==
The ecoregion forms a long band, about 2,100 km long and 600 km wide, from the western edge of Siberia at the Ural Mountains in Ural in the east, through Povolzhye, to Central Russia and Ukraine. Most of the terrain is rolling hills and some plains. Average elevations range from 150 meters (above sea level) in the lowlands to 250 meters in the hills, with some isolated ranges of low mountains on the edges of the area.

The ecoregion can be divided into sub-provinces from west to east: Dnieper Upland, Dnieper Lowland, Central Russian Upland, Oka–Don Plain, Volga Upland, and the Trans-Volga. Moisture diminishes as the ecoregion stretches to the east, as does the forest fragmentation.

== Climate ==
The climate in most of the ecoregion is Humid continental climate, warm summer (Köppen climate classification (Dfb)). This climate has large seasonal temperature differentials. It has a warm summer, with at least four months averaging over 10 °C (50 °F), but no month averaging over 22 °C (72 °F). Seasonal temperature extremities increase eastward across the ecoregion, due to the nature of continental climate towards the center of the continent.

== Flora ==
The natural vegetation of the forest steppe is a mosaic of woodlands and open shrublands and grasslands.

Shrublands typically include the shrubs Caragana frutex, Prunus fruticosa, and Prunus stepposa. Stipa ucrainica, and Bromus riparius are common grasses.

Typical trees of the woodlands and forests include Quercus robur, Tilia cordata, Acer platanoides, Juniperus communis, Quercus petraea, Picea abies, Abies alba, Alnus glutinosa, Fagus sylvatica, Taxus baccata, Acer pseudoplatanus, Malus sylvestris, Viburnum lantana, Fraxinus excelsior, Aesculus hippocastanum, Rhamnus cathartica, Ulmus glabra, Ulmus minor, Populus alba, Pinus sylvestris, Betula pendula, Populus tremula, Populus nigra, Salix alba, Juglans regia, and Corylus avellana.

For centuries, scientists have speculated on the causes of variations in stands of trees. It is currently understood that on the macro level, steppes are more arid and that trees thin out in the transition zones. Because the terrain of the ecoregion is relatively flat or low hills, with no physical barriers between the biomes to the north and south, the plant communities tend to be shaped by local variations in water flow. Differences in drainage, variations in soil type (pine trees on sandy soil, deciduous trees on loamy soil, etc.) and salinity, the effects of blowing wind (which drives snow off the hills into depressions, affecting soil quality), and the historic activities of humans all combine to create the mosaic character of the region.

Open landscapes show that steppe plant communities can compete with forest. Sedges are characteristic in the steppe areas, resisting low-moisture conditions with much of their biomass underground.

== Fauna ==
Characteristic mammals include the bobak marmot (Marmota bobak) and European ground squirrel (Spermophilus citellus). The European bison (Bison bonasus) and Saiga antelope (Saiga tatarica tartarica) formerly lived in the forest-steppe, but are now locally extinct.

== Protected areas ==
The East European forest steppe has been affected heavily by human pressure: over half is arable land, and the natural forest stands have mostly been cleared. Little of the territory is legally protected as nature reserves, and such reserves that exist tend to be small tracts set aside for study. Representative protected areas in the ecoregion include:

=== Russian Federation ===
- Bashkiriya National Park, on the eastern tip of the ecoregion, at the southern base of the Ural Mountains. (Area: 920 km²)
- Belogorye Nature Reserve, one of the last riverine old-growth oak forests that used to be typical of the East European Forest-Steppe. (Area: 21 km²)
- Central Black Earth Nature Reserve, a scattered-site reserve of black-soil prairie set aside for scientific study . (Area: 52 km²)
- Chavash Varmane Bor National Park, a large unbroken forest in the middle Volga region of Chuvashia. (Area: 252 km²)
- Galichya Gora, six small clusters of botanical habitats of the Central Russian Uplands. (Area: 0.23 km²)
- Kaluzhskiye Zaseki Nature Reserve, an old-growth forest in Kaluga Oblast that has been protected in some form for a thousand years. (Area: 185 km²)
- Khopyor Nature Reserve, protecting floodplains, upland oak forests, and meadows in the Voronezh Oblast region of Russia. (Area: 162 km²)
- Samarskaya Luka National Park, 1,340 km².
- Sengiley Hills National Park, 437 km².
- Smolny National Park, 365 km².
- Voronina Nature Reserve, representative of the riverine wetlands of the Oka–Don Plain. (Area: 108 km²)
- Zhiguli Nature Reserve, mountain ridge surrounded by a bend of the Volga River. (Area: 232 km²)

=== Ukraine ===
- Bile Ozero National Nature Park. (Area: 70.14 km²)
- Chornyi Lis National Nature Park. (Area: 13.71 km²)
- Dvorichna National Nature Park. (Area: 31.31 km²)
- Hetman National Nature Park, a band of patchy forests and grasslands. (Area: 234 km²)
- Homilsha Woods National Nature Park, transition zone between the East European forest steppe ecoregion (on the north) and the Pontic–Caspian steppe ecoregion (on the south). (Area: 143 km²)
- Ichnia National Nature Park, in the river valleys of the Uday River and the Ichenka River, relatively flat with many lakes. (Area: 97 km²)
- Kaniv Nature Reserve, transition zone between the Central European mixed forests and East European forest steppe ecoregions. (Area: 20 km²)
- Karmeliuk's Podillia, on the forested slopes of the Ukrainian Shield. (Area: 165.18 km²)
- Kholodnyi Yar National Nature Park (Area: 6.833 km²)
- Lower Sula National Nature Park. (Area: 186 km²)
- Mezyn National Nature Park. (Area: 310 km²)
- Michael's Virgin Land Nature Reserve, characterised by a mosaic of forests, steppe, and riverine wetlands. (Area: 9 km²)
- Pyriatyn National Nature Park. (Area: 120 km²)
- Sloboda National Nature Park. (Area: 52 km²)

== See also ==
- List of ecoregions in Ukraine
- List of ecoregions in Romania
- List of ecoregions in Russia
