= Ulyanovo =

Ulyanovo (Russian: Улья́ново) is the name of several rural localities in Russia:

- Ulyanovo, Arkhangelsk Oblast, a village in Rakulsky Selsoviet of Kholmogorsky District in Arkhangelsk Oblast
- Ulyanovo, Ilyinsky District, Ivanovo Oblast, a village in Ilyinsky District of Ivanovo Oblast
- Ulyanovo, Kineshemsky District, Ivanovo Oblast, a village in Kineshemsky District of Ivanovo Oblast
- Ulyanovo, Kaliningrad Oblast, a settlement in Luninsky Rural Okrug of Nemansky District in Kaliningrad Oblast
- Ulyanovo, Kaluga Oblast, a selo in Ulyanovsky District of Kaluga Oblast
- Ulyanovo, Kirov Oblast, a village in Istobensky Rural Okrug of Orichevsky District in Kirov Oblast; 58°24′N 48°48′E
- Ulyanovo, Komi Republic, a settlement in Kuzhba Selo Administrative Territory of Ust-Kulomsky District in the Komi Republic; 61°49′N 53°34′E
- Ulyanovo, Krasnodar Krai, a khutor in Kostromskoy Rural Okrug of Mostovsky District in Krasnodar Krai; 44°33′N 40°34′E
- Ulyanovo, Moscow Oblast, a village in Poretskoye Rural Settlement of Mozhaysky District in Moscow Oblast
- Ulyanovo, Bor, Nizhny Novgorod Oblast, a village in Kantaurovsky Selsoviet under the administrative jurisdiction of the town of oblast significance of Bor in Nizhny Novgorod Oblast
- Ulyanovo, Lukoyanovsky District, Nizhny Novgorod Oblast, a selo under the administrative jurisdiction of the town of district significance of Lukoyanov in Lukoyanovsky District of Nizhny Novgorod Oblast
- Ulyanovo, Perm Krai, a village in Kungursky District of Perm Krai
- Ulyanovo, Opochetsky District, Pskov Oblast, a village in Opochetsky District of Pskov Oblast
- Ulyanovo, Ostrovsky District, Pskov Oblast, a village in Ostrovsky District of Pskov Oblast
- Ulyanovo, Kalininsky District, Tver Oblast, a village in Verkhnevolzhskoye Rural Settlement of Kalininsky District in Tver Oblast
- Ulyanovo, Kuvshinovsky District, Tver Oblast, a village in Bolshekuznechkovskoye Rural Settlement of Kuvshinovsky District in Tver Oblast
- Ulyanovo, Zubtsovsky District, Tver Oblast, a village in Ulyanovskoye Rural Settlement of Zubtsovsky District in Tver Oblast
- Ulyanovo, Vologda Oblast, a village in Irdomatsky Selsoviet of Cherepovetsky District in Vologda Oblast
- Ulyanovo, Gavrilov-Yamsky District, Yaroslavl Oblast, a village in Stoginsky Rural Okrug of Gavrilov-Yamsky District in Yaroslavl Oblast
- Ulyanovo, Tutayevsky District, Yaroslavl Oblast, a village in Pomogalovsky Rural Okrug of Tutayevsky District in Yaroslavl Oblast
- Ulyanovo, Uglichsky District, Yaroslavl Oblast, a village in Otradnovsky Rural Okrug of Uglichsky District in Yaroslavl Oblast
