= Kaluzhskiye Zaseki Nature Reserve =

Strict nature reserve in Kaluga Oblast, Russia

- Russian: Государственный природный заповедник «Калужские засеки» (Also: Kaluzhskie Zaseki)
- IUCN category Ia (strict nature reserve)
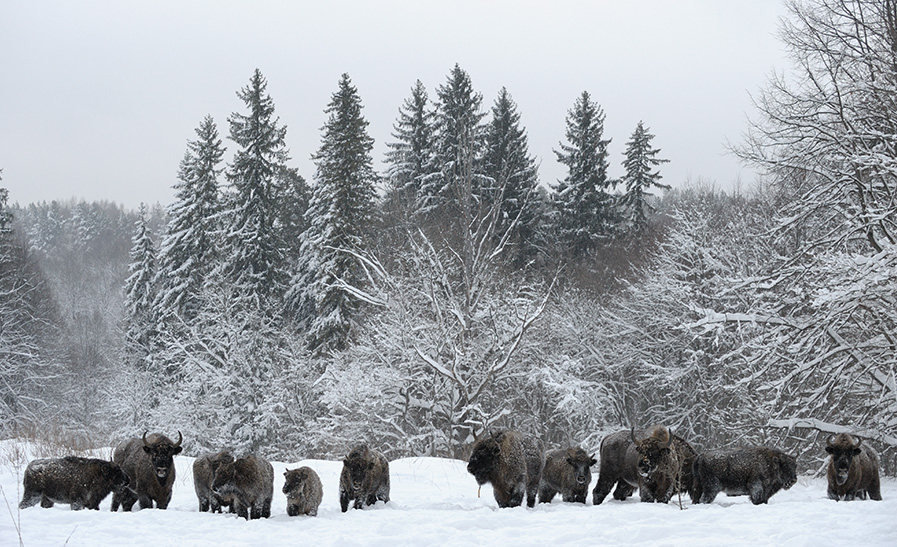
- Kaluzhskiye Zaseki Zapovednik

- Location within Russia
- Location: Kaluga Oblast
- Nearest city: Ulyanovo
- Coordinates: 53°35′26″N 35°47′17″E
- Area: 18,533 hectares (45,796 acres; 72 sq mi)
- Established: 1992
- Governing body: Ministry of Natural Resources and Environment (Russia)
- Website: http://zaseki.ru/

Kaluzhskiye Zaseki Nature Reserve (Russian: Государственный природный заповедник «Калужские засеки») (or Kaluzhskie Zaseki for short) is a Russian zapovednik (strict ecological reserve). Zaseki in Russian means abatises, field fortifications made of felled trees. In medieval times, the Kaluga region was part of the defensive line between the Russian forests to the north and potential invaders from the south. The reserve has been protected in some form for a thousand years, and remains old-growth forest. The reserve is situated in the Ulyanovsky District, Kaluga Oblast. It was formally established in 1992 and has an area of 18,533 hectares (71.56 sq mi).

== Topography ==
The Kaluzhskiye Zaseki Reserve sits on a mosaic of different soil types—black earth supporting broad-leaf forest, sandy soils supporting pine forests, grey-forest soil of northern forests, and steppe grassland. The terrain is gently rolling hills with riverine gullies and ravines over glacial moraines and eroded soil. The Vytebet River passes near the security zone, and there is a network of small rivers and forest streams. There are two sections to the reserve, about equal in size and separated north-south from each other by about 12 km.

== Climate and ecoregion ==
Kaluzhskiye Zaseki is located in the East European forest steppe ecoregion, a transition zone between the broadleaf forests of the north and the grasslands to the south.. This ecoregion is characterized by a mosaic of forests, steppe, and riverine wetlands.

The climate of Kaluzhskiye Zaseki is Humid continental climate, warm summer (Köppen climate classification (Dfb)). This climate is characterized by large swings in temperature, both diurnally and seasonally, with mild summers and cold, snowy winters. In Kaluzhskie, the average temperature in January is −10 °C (14 °F), and in July is 18 °C (64 °F). Precipitation ranges from 450 to 700 mm/year, with maximum rainfall in July. The prevailing winds are westerly and south-westerly.

== Flora, fauna, and funga ==
The reserve is 96% covered with forest, of which about 25% is broad-leaf forest characterized by lime, oak, ash, elm and maple. Another 25% of the forest is birch in the secondary forests. Twelve percent of the area is pine forest, and an equal amount in spruce. Scientists on the reserve have recorded over 400 species of vascular plants and over 500 species of mushrooms.

Kaluzhskiye is working, along with Orlovskoye Polesye National Park, to reintroduce the European bison to Central Russia. As of 2013, there were 84 bison in the Kaluzhskie herd, which appeared to be healthy and growing. The bison seek forested tracts with small meadows.

== Ecoeducation and access ==
As a strict nature reserve, the Kaluzhskiye Zaseki Reserve is mostly closed to the general public, although scientists and those with environmental education purposes can make arrangements with park management for visits. There are, however, ecotourist routes in the reserve that are open to the public but which require permits to be obtained in advance. The northern sector has 2.7 km of guided trails with information boards and is accessible to casual hikers and children. There are three trails on the southern tract, with over 5 km total on circular routes that highlight the flora and fauna of the region and provide vantages for bird watching. The reserve sponsors a nature education center that is open to the public daily. The main office is in the village of Ulyanovo.

== See also ==
- Zapovednik § List of Russian Nature Reserves
- National parks of Russia
