= Chavash Varmane =

National park in Chuvashia, Russia

Chavash Varmane National Park
- Чаваш Вармане
- IUCN category II (national park)
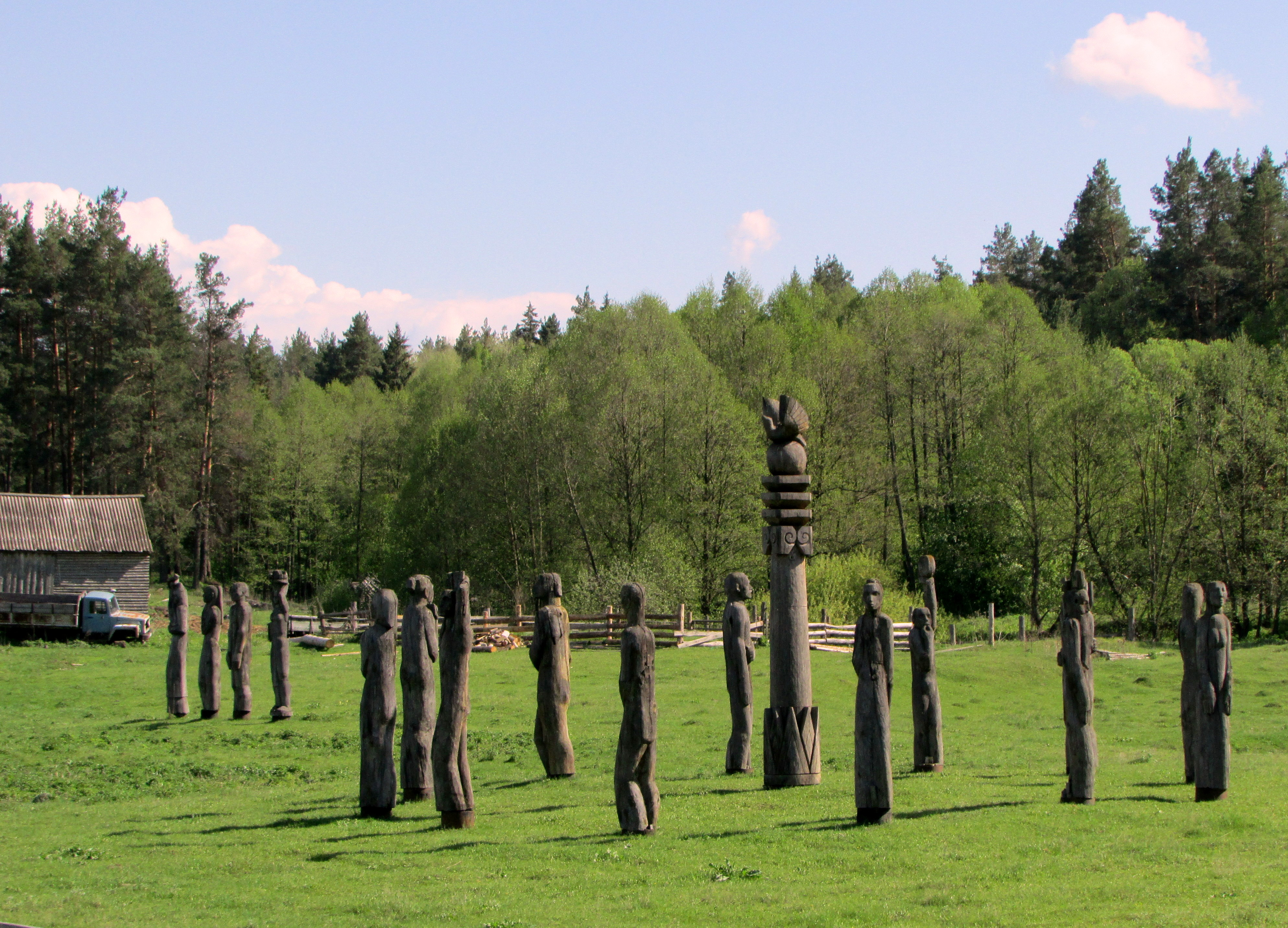

- Location within Russia
- Location: Chuvashia
- Nearest city: Cheboksary
- Coordinates: 54°45′N 47°08′E
- Established: June 23, 1993
- Governing body: FGBI "Chavash Varmane Bor"
- Website: http://www.npark21.ru/

The Chuvash Forest National Park or Chavash Varmane (Russian: Национальный парк «Чаваш Вармане») comprises a large contiguous (unbroken) forest in the middle Volga region. The national park was created to serve the dual purpose of preserving biological diversity and protecting a site representative of the Chuvash people. The park is about 100 km west of where the Kama River enters the Volga, on the East Central Plain of Europe. It is in Shemurshinsky District of the Republic of Chuvashia, Russia.

== Topography ==
In an area of about 100 square miles, Chavash Vermane has three different types of forest: southern taiga (conifers), Volga Upland oak forest, and mixed broadleaf and coniferous forest. The covered territory is roughly rectangular, being 24 km north to south and 17 km east to west. A 12 km buffer zone surrounds the park, and interior zones have been established for ecological reserve-replacement, for recreation, and for visitor service facilities. 95% of the park is forest, with the remaining land being marsh, grassland, and pasture. The forest is situated on a network of river valleys cut by the Abamza River from the north, the Bezdna River from the west, which meet in the middle of the park and flow south, plus numerous other tributaries. Many of the rivers meander through flat floodplains.

Chavash Varmane Bor National Park (green bordered area in NW of map)

== Climate and ecoregion ==
The Chuvash Forest is in the East European forest steppe ecoregion. The climate of the Chuvash Forest is moderate continental (Köppen climate classification Dfb). Average temperatures range from –13 C (-9 F) in January to 19 C (66 F) in July. Annual precipitation average 607 – 657 mm.

Cheboksary, Chuvashia, Russia

Climate chart (precipitation, max. and min. temperature)
J	F	M	A	M	J	J	A	S	O	N	D
1.2 15 3	0.9 19 7	0.9 29 17	1.4 47 33	1.6 65 46	2.6 72 53	2.8 76 58	2.5 72 54	2.1 60 45	2.1 44 33	1.7 30 22	1.3 21 10
- █ Average max. and min. temperatures in °F
- █ Precipitation totals in inches
- Source: worldweather.org
Metric conversion
J	F	M	A	M	J	J	A	S	O	N	D
30 −9 −16	24 −7 −14	24 −2 −9	35 9 0	40 18 8	66 22 12	71 24 14	64 22 12	54 16 7	53 7 1	43 −1 −6	34 −6 −12
- █ Average max. and min. temperatures in °C
- █ Precipitation totals in mm

The duration of the warm season (daily temperatures remaining above 0 C), is 200–201 days per year. There is cycle of drought every 3–4 years, but sufficient rain otherwise to support the forest.

== Plants ==
An inventory of trees conducted in 2005 recorded 45% as pine, 27% birch, 15% aspen and 13% other. Saplings were recorded at 48%, middle-aged at 40%, and 6% aged; the average age of trees in the park is 50 years. Park management noted that the high levels of middle-aged trees was due to intensive logging in pre-park times, as well as a large forest fire in 1972.

== Animals ==
The park is highly representative of Chuvashia's animal life. Over 90% of the species found in the Chuvash Republic are found in Chavash Vermane. Records indicate 40 species of mammals, 170 species of birds (90 of which are nesting or breeding in the park), 16 species of amphibians or reptiles, and 19 species of fish. The types of animals expected to be found in pine and broadleaf temperate forest are found in the territory: hare, squirrel, badger, polecat, mink, marten, pond frogs, etc. Since establishment of the park, hunting has been prohibited and brown bear, wolves, and beaver have returned. A count of the fish in the rivers and floodplain lakes showed nine species - Chub, Dace, Striped bystranka, Common roach, gudgeon, Tench, Ide, Loach, and Trout - accounting for 95% of the catch. In recent years, the park reports crayfish in the rivers, described as an indicator of improving water cleanliness. Birds of prey include the near-threatened Pallid harrier and the vulnerable Greater spotted eagle.

== History and tourism ==
In ancient times, the Chuvash Forest was in the meeting zone between two cultures: the nomadic steppe peoples to the south, and the agriculture culture in the forested area. Forest industry included charcoal making and the extraction of tar from the trees.

The park has numerous "ecological trails" and "ethno-ecological' trails, with educational signs about the forest environment and the use of the forest by ancestors. There are trails accessible to all ages and abilities.

== See also ==
- Protected areas of Russia
- National parks of Russia
