= List of ecoregions in Romania =

This is a list of ecoregions in Romania.

== Terrestrial ==
Romania is in the Palearctic realm. Ecoregions are listed by biome.

=== Temperate broadleaf and mixed forests ===
- Balkan mixed forests
- East European forest steppe
- Pannonian mixed forests

=== Temperate coniferous forests ===
- Carpathian montane conifer forests

=== Temperate grasslands, savannas, and shrublands ===
- Pontic Steppe

== Freshwater ==
- Dniester - Lower Danube

== Marine ==
- Black Sea
