= Manturovo, Kursk Oblast =

Rural locality in Kursk Oblast, Russia

Manturovo Мантурово
- Selo
- Interactive map of Manturovo
- Location of Manturovo Manturovo (Kursk Oblast)
- Coordinates: 51°27′13″N 37°07′32″E
- Country: Russia
- Federal subject: Kursk Oblast
- Administrative district: Manturovsky District
- SelsovietSelsoviet: Manturovsky
- First mentioned: 1709

Area
  - Total: 8 km^{2} (3.1 sq mi)

Population (2010 Census)
  - Total: 3,734
  - Estimate (2010): 2,767 (−25.9%)
  - Density: 470/km^{2} (1,200/sq mi)

Administrative status
  - Capital of: Manturovsky District, Manturovsky Selsoviet

Municipal status
  - Municipal district: Manturovsky Municipal District
  - Rural settlement: Manturovsky Selsoviet Rural Settlement
  - Capital of: Manturovsky Municipal District, Manturovsky Selsoviet Rural Settlement
- Time zone: UTC+3 (MSK)
- Postal code: 307000
- Dialing code: +7 47155
- OKTMO ID: 38623422101

Manturovo (Russian: Мантурово) is a rural locality (a selo) and the administrative center of Manturovsky District, Kursk Oblast, Russia. Population: 2,767 (2010 census); 2,819 (2002 census); 2,992 (1989 Soviet census).
