= Central Black Earth Nature Reserve =

Nature reserve in Kursk Oblast, Russia

Central Tsernozemny Nature Reserve
- Russian: Центрально-Чернозёмный заповедник (Also: Tsentralno-Chernozemny, "VV Alekhine")
- IUCN category Ia (strict nature reserve)
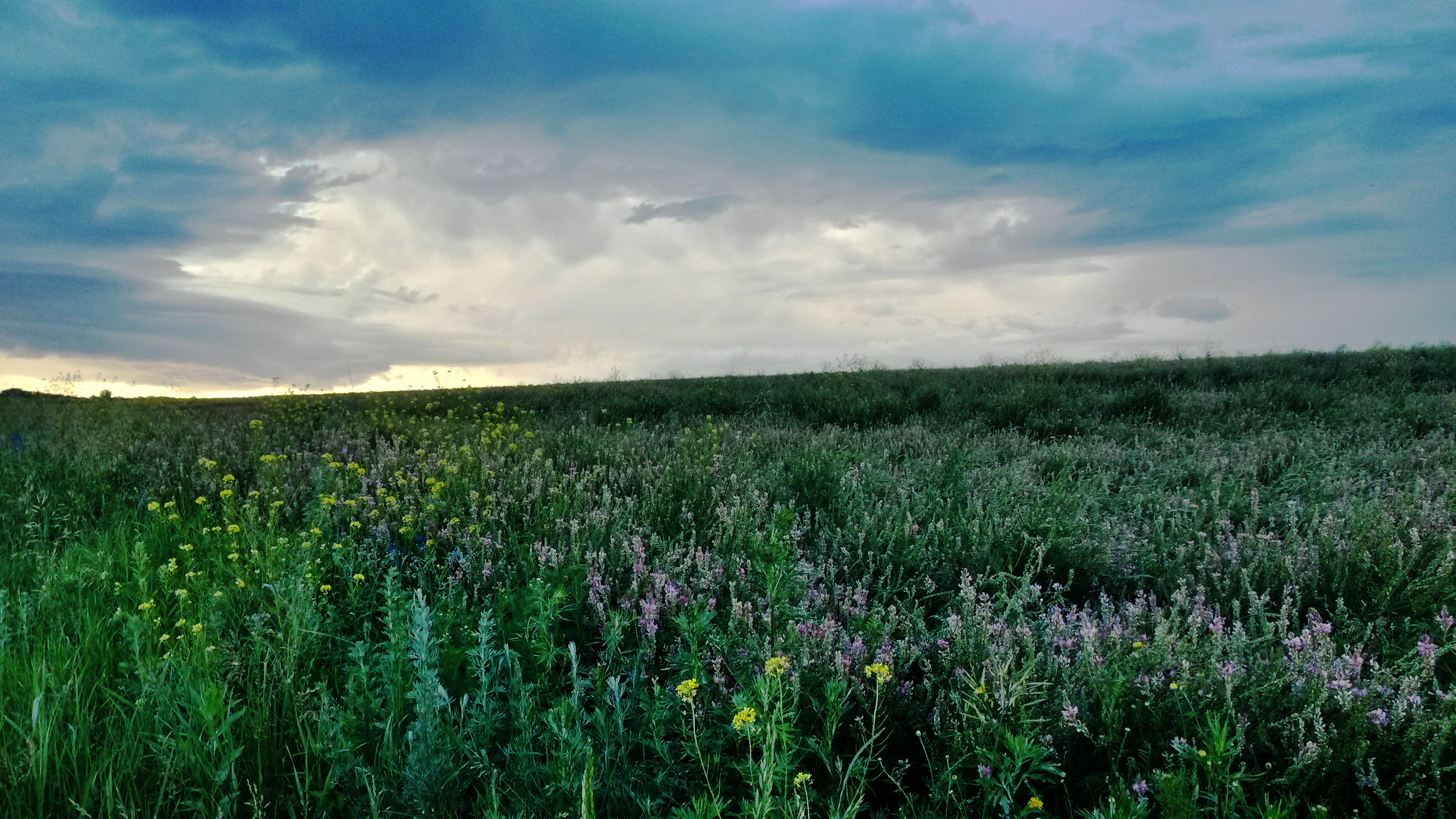
- Central Tsernozemsky Zapovednik

- Location within Russia
- Location: Kursk Oblast
- Nearest city: Kursk
- Coordinates: 51°8′49″N 36°25′48″E
- Area: 5,287 hectares (13,064 acres; 20 sq mi)
- Established: 1935
- Governing body: Ministry of Natural Resources and Environment (Russia)
- Website: http://zapoved-kursk.ru/

The Central Tsernozemny Nature Reserve (Russian: Центрально-Чернозёмный заповедник; also Tsentralno-Chernozemny, or CCZ; English: lit. "Central Black Soil") is a Russian 'zapovednik' (strict ecological reserve) that protects for scientific study a collection of selected sites of black soil prairie in the southwestern part of the Central Uplands within the middle of the forest-steppe zone. The six sites of the reserve spread out to the southeast of the city of Kursk, in the Medvensky District, Manturovsky District, Gorshechensky District of Kursk Oblast. It covers an area of 5,287 ha (20.41 sq mi).

== History ==
The site is named after the biologist VV Alekhine. The reserve was created in 1935. In 1978 it was included in the World Network of Biosphere Reserves.

The territory of Central Black Earth Biosphere Reserve was divided between the core area, the buffer zone, and the transition zone. V.V. Alekhin nature reserve was the core of new biosphere reserve, its territory was divided into five fragments, three of which were near such big cities as Kursk and Stariy Oskol. The main advantage of the usage of that nature reserve was in the long duration of its existence and making the long-term series of observations as recorded in the annals of nature (recording of climate data, biological processes, and human influence). The first was the absolutely protected areas of forest and steppe which were connected with territories strictly controlled haymaking or grazing. Here, the existing semi-natural ecosystems kept saved and the small arrays of oak forests with black soils were the most valuable territories.

The buffer zone is a conservation zone of the reserve, a strip a kilometer wide, where economic activities are allowed only under the supervision of the reserve staff. The transition zone, the zone of typical usage, consisted of the demonstration Farm of the All-Union Scientific Research Institute of Agriculture and Soil Protection from Erosion of V.I. Lenin Academy of Agricultural Sciences. The mine dumps and territory of nuclear power stations near Kursk was included to the transition zone.

== Topography ==
Although CCZ is one of the smallest reserves in the federal network, it is highly important from a scientific point of view as a collection of preserved remains of northern grasslands in the Kursk region. Reserve management refers to its "six patches of paradise", with virgin northern steppes, black earth prairie, pre-glacial vegetation on chalk hills, relict sphagnum swamps, and floodplain complexes. The "black soil" sectors in particular serve as a reference for the study of the ecology of the especially fertile soils of the region. The six sectors in the reserve are:

- Strelets (2,046 ha). In the Dnieper River basin, at an altitude of 178–262 meters above sea level. There are open lakes, and groundwater occurs at 12–14 meters.
- Cossack (1,638 ha). Also in the Dnieper basin.
- Zorinsk (495 ha). Mostly forest, with altitudes from 169 to 200 meters. Features individual bogs on the second terrace above the river. The bogs are 5 to 75 meters in diameter, with depressed areas formed by leaching of soils and subsidence on some underlying layers of loess.
- Psla Floodplain (481 ha). Situated in the floodplains of the Diet and Psel Rivers, and 155–167 meters.
- 'Barkalovka (368 ha). In the Don River Basin.
- Bukreeva Barma (259 ha). Also in the Don River basin. 163–238 meters in altitude, in the watershed of the Oskol and Kshen rivers.

The terrain in most areas is eroded soils and karst topography, with smooth raised areas, and shallow depressions. The black soil, which derives its color from a high humus content (540 tons/hectare) is unusual for being under deciduous forest, and reaches a depth of 1.5 m (4.9 ft).

== Climate and ecoregion ==
Central Tsernozemsky is located in the East European forest steppe ecoregion, a transition zone between the broadleaf forests of the north and the grasslands to the south.. This ecoregion is characterized by a mosaic of forests, steppe, and riverine wetlands.

The climate of Central Tsernozemsky is Humid continental climate, warm summer (Köppen climate classification (Dfb)). This climate is characterized by large swings in temperature, both diurnally and seasonally, with mild summers and cold, snowy winters.

== Flora and fauna ==
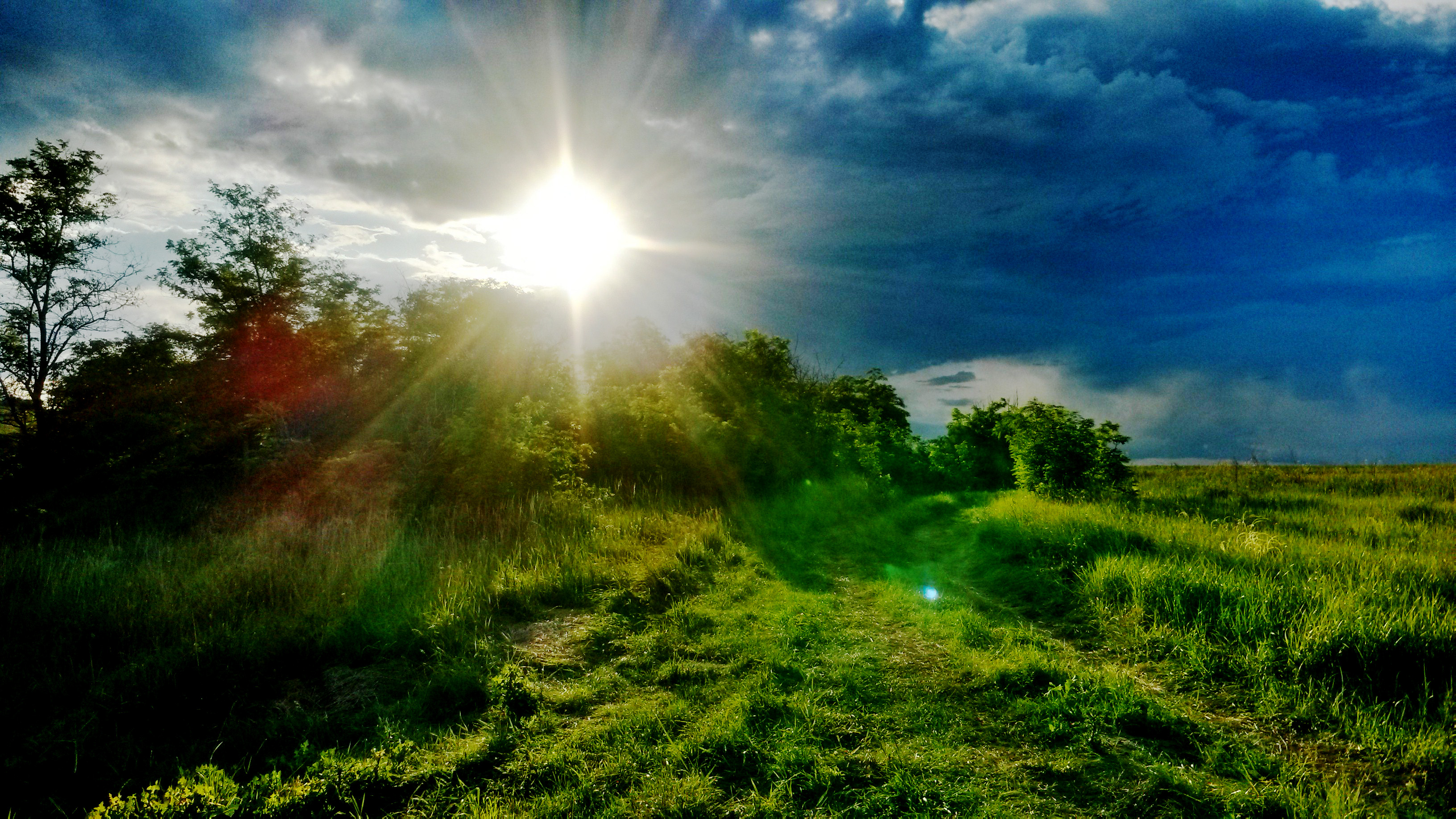
Forest-steppe meadow in the Central Black Soil Reserve

The plant life is one of predominantly meadow steppes (44% of the territory), and deciduous forest. Meadow steppes change dramatically in color across the seasons. The presence of spagnum bogs is unusual in the steppe zone. Of the forested area, 81% is natural growth, and 19% is forest plantation. Oak trees predominate, with some Norway maple, wild pear and apple, and aspen. White birch is found in the bog areas. The understory tends towards wild cherry and hazel. Scientists on the reserve have recorded 1,340 species of angiosperms.

The animal life of the reserve is representative of European forest-steppe. Characteristics mammals include fox, badger and hare. Larger mammals include roe deer and wild boar; altogether scientists on the reserve have recorded 51 species of mammals. The steppe areas record many field mice, voles, and mole-rats. Over 226 species of birds have been recorded, with over 100 being passerine.

== Ecoeducation and access ==
As a strict nature reserve, the Central Tsernozemsky Reserve is mostly closed to the general public, although scientists and those with 'environmental education' purposes can make arrangements with park management for visits. There are 'ecotourist' routes in the reserve, however, that are open to the public, but require permits to be obtained in advance. One such ecological route, called "stone woman", passes a stone monument dated to the 11th century. The main office is in the city of Kursk.

== See also ==
- List of Russian Nature Reserves (class 1a 'zapovedniks')
- National parks of Russia
- Protected areas of Russia
