= Sengiley Hills =

Russian hills near Volga River

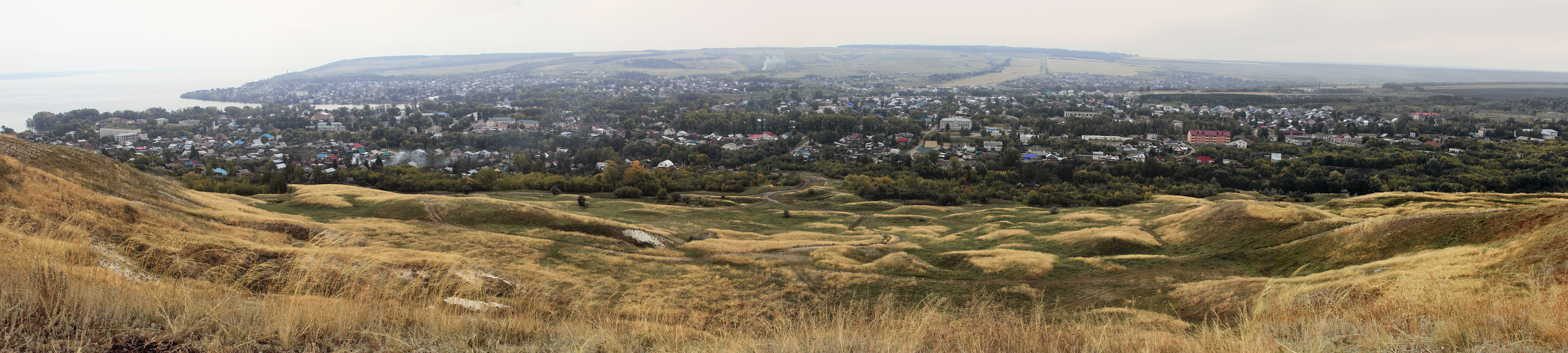

Geography
- Location within Russia
- Country: Russia
- Region: Ulyanovsk Oblast
- Range coordinates: 53°59′48″N 48°37′52″E
- Parent range: Volga Uplands

The Sengiley Hills (Russian: Сенгиле́евские го́ры) are formed on the edge of the Volga Uplands, on the right bank of the middle Volga River in the Uluyanovsk region of Russia.

The area is part of the forest-steppe region, featuring representatives of forest: birch, pine tree, oak. The river banks of the Volga River along the eastern edge are on the Kuybyshev Reservoir. Much of the Sengiley region has been protected in the boundaries of the Sengileevskie Mountains National Park. This park was established in 2017.
