= Ichnia National Nature Park =

National park in Ukraine

- Ukrainian: Ічнянський національний природний парк
- IUCN category II (national park)
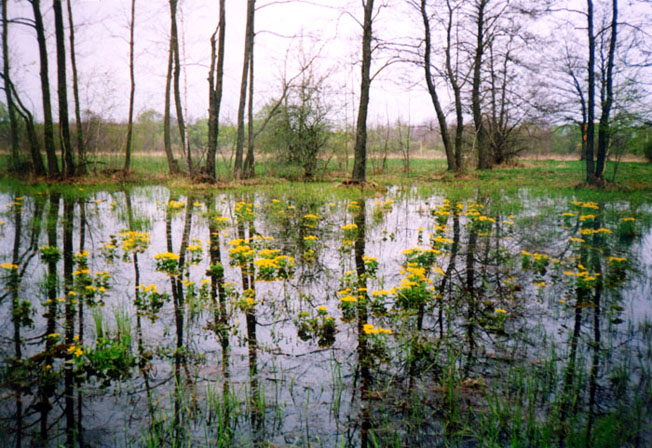
- Ichnia National Nature Park

- Location within Ukraine
- Location: Chernihiv Oblast, Pryluky Raion
- Nearest city: Ichnia
- Coordinates: 50.8087°N 32.2917°E
- Area: 9,669 hectares (23,893 acres; 97 km^{2}; 37 sq mi)
- Established: 2004
- Governing body: Ministry of Ecology and Natural Resources (Ukraine)
- Website: http://ichn-park.in.ua/

The Ichnia National Nature Park (Ukrainian: Ічнянський національний природний парк) is a national park of Ukraine that covers forest-steppe terrain in the Uday basin, about 120 km northeast of Kyiv. The park is administratively in Pryluky Raion in Chernihiv Oblast.

== Topography ==
The park is in the general region known as the Dnieper Lowlands, in the river valleys of the Uday River and the Ichenka River. The terrain is relatively flat, with numerous lakes, ponds, and meandering streams. The town of Ichyna is at the northeast corner of the park.

== Climate and ecoregion ==
The official climate designation for the Ichnia area is Humid continental climate, warm summer (Köppen climate classification (Dfb)). This climate is characterized by large swings in temperature, both diurnally and seasonally, with mild summers and cold, snowy winters. The average temperature in January is −7 °C (19 °F), and in July is 19 °C (66 °F). Average annual precipitation is 556 mm, 70% of which falls in the warm months.

Ichnia is in the East European forest steppe ecoregion, a band of patchwork forests and grasslands that stretches from Ukraine to the southern Ural Mountains in the east.

== Flora and fauna ==
The area is forest-steppe, with many wetlands due to the flat terrain and connecting rivers. Primary forest type is oak-hornbeam in the west, and oak-pine on the terraces of the rivers. There are forest bogs in the Uday valley and tributaries.

== Public use ==
There are two major ecological excursion routes through the park. A small hotel is available for visitors, and tourist equipment rental. Locals use the parkland for collecting berries and mushrooms; there are no barriers on the internal roads.

== See also ==
- National Parks of Ukraine
