= Homilsha Woods National Nature Park =

National park in Ukraine

- Ukrainian: Національний природний парк «Гомільша́нські ліси»
- IUCN category II (national park)
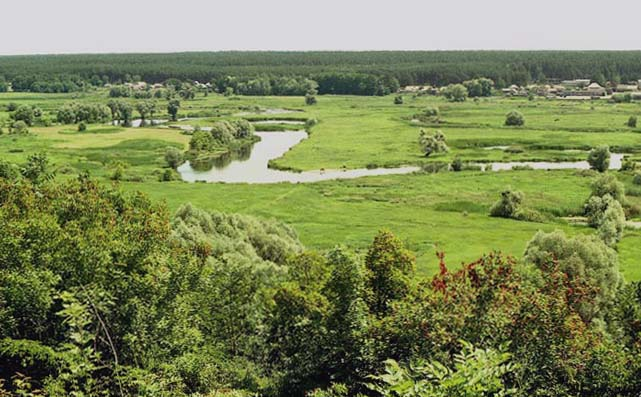
- Homilsha Woods National Nature Park

- Location within Ukraine
- Location: Chuhuiv Raion, Kharkiv Oblast
- Coordinates: 49°35′N 36°20′E
- Area: 14,314 hectares (35,371 acres; 143 km^{2}; 55 sq mi)
- Established: 2004
- Governing body: Ministry of Ecology and Natural Resources (Ukraine)
- Website: http://www.gomilsha.org.ua/jupgrade/index.php

The Homilsha Woods National Nature Park (Ukrainian: Національний природний парк «Гомільшанські ліси», romanized: Homil'šans'ki lisy) is a national park of Ukraine that covers established forests in the Donets River valley. The site has been a protected area for a very long time, beginning with Peter the Great designating local territory as a 'protected ship grove' for wood to build ships. The site also has high ecological value as forest-steppe land. Administratively, the park is in the Chuhuiv Raion of Kharkiv Oblast, about 50 km south of the regional city of Kharkiv.

== Topography ==
The park is composed of a series of protected and recreational areas along both banks of the middle reaches of the Donets River and the Gomolshy River. The right banks of the river is hilly spurs of the Middle Russian Uplands, ranging up to 100 meters above the river. The left bank is generally flat plain of the East European Plain Included on the grounds are many archaeological sites and monuments of historical importance from all eras of Ukrainian history, from the Bronze Age (second millennium BC) to the time of Kyivan Rus.

== Climate and ecoregion ==
The Homilsha Woods area has a Humid continental climate, warm summer (Köppen climate classification (Dfb)). This climate is characterized by large swings in temperature, both diurnally and seasonally, with mild summers and cold, snowy winters. Precipitation in the general region averages 450 mm/yr. The average temperature in August is 21.5 °C (70.7 °F).

Homilsha Woods is in the transition zone between the East European forest steppe ecoregion (on the north) and the Pontic–Caspian steppe ecoregion (on the south).

== Biodiversity ==
The terrain is one of hills and ravines, with maple-ash-oak forests on the slopes of the right bank, and pine forests on the sandy terraces of the left bank. The forested areas are bordered by wet and dry meadows, with numerous small lakes. 500 hectares of the forest are 130–150 years old, with some oaks 200–300 years old.

Animals. 50 species of fish are found in the lakes and streams, 153 species of birds, and 53 species of mammals. Chromista. More than 80 species of chromistans (organisms historically but incorrectly classified with the fungi) have been recorded from the park. Many of these occur on or in living plant tissues, while others are parasites of fish. Fungi. More than 1200 non-lichen-forming species of fungi have been recorded from within the park. These include mycorrhizal fungi, fungi in or on living plant tissues, saprotrophs mostly on dead plant material but also on dung, and a few species growing on arthropods or on other fungi. Plants. 850 species of plants have been recorded in the park, with 138 listed as rare. Protista. More than 160 species of slime-moulds (one small group of protists formerly classified with the fungi) have also been recorded.

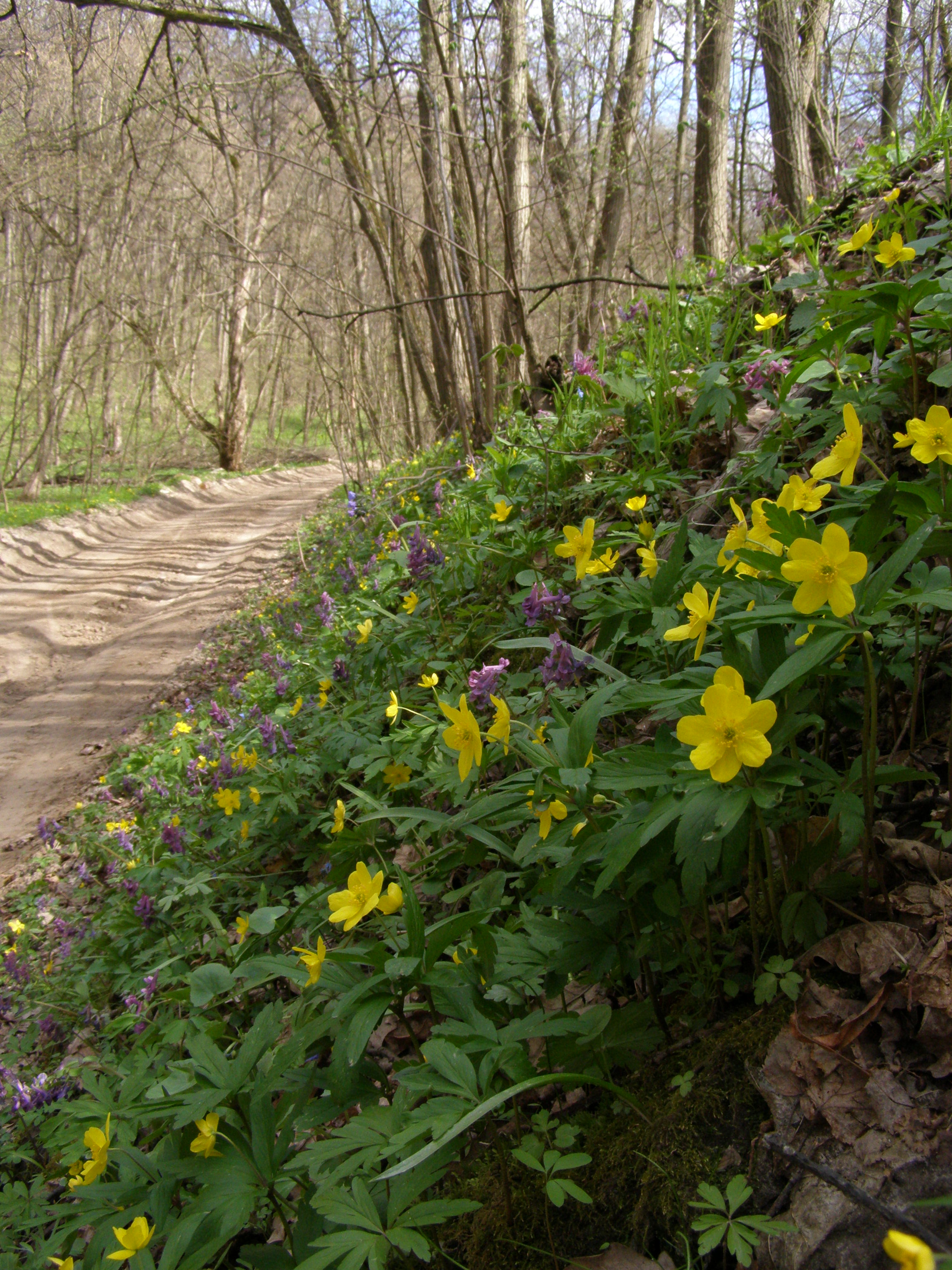
Spring flowers along excursion route, Holmolsh Woods

== Public use ==
There are five major hiking routes, and guided excursions are available. Shorter hiking routes access historical and cultural monuments. Park management sponsors educational programs, as well as scientific and research projects. There is lodging at marked points along the river through the park. Swimming is permitted at designated areas.

The National Nature Park "Homilshan Forests" occupies a special place in nature conservation. The protected area here was very successfully allocated - in the very heart of the park, which created difficulties for people to visit it. The roads leading to the park are blocked by barriers and there are safety signs. In addition, at the suggestion of the scientific staff of the park, special protective areas from 10 to 120 hectares, called "especially valuable natural areas", were allocated in the economic zone and in the zone of regulated recreation, which were prescribed in the Project for the organization of the territory of this park. As a rule, any solid and selective felling, recreation, installation of small architectural forms were prohibited on them, and regular haying is not carried out in May–June, as in steppe reserves, but in autumn.

== See also ==
- National Parks of Ukraine
