= Manturovsky District, Kursk Oblast =

Manturovsky District Мантуровский район (Russian)
- District
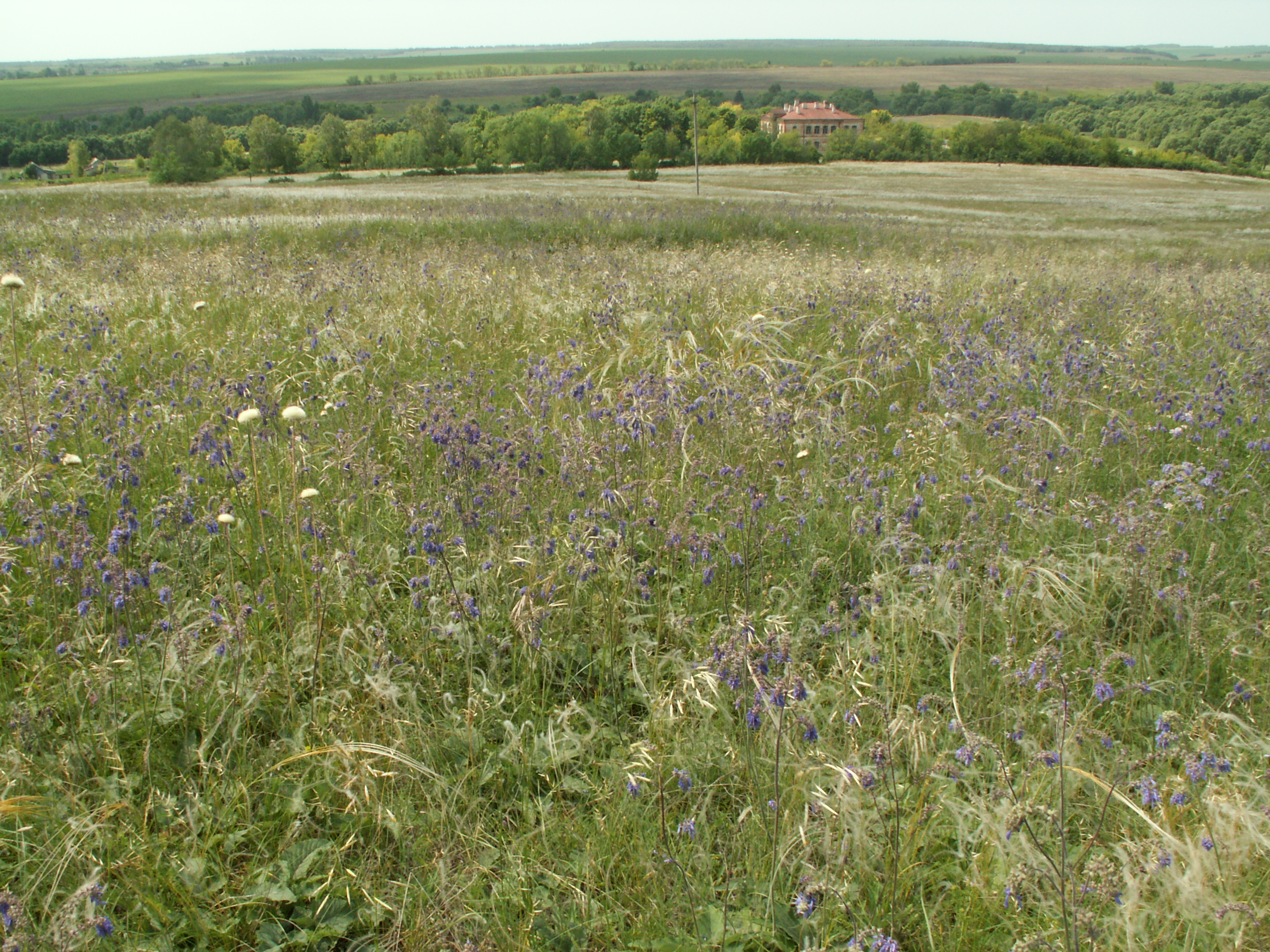
- Bukreevy barmy, a part of Central Black Earth Nature Reserve, Manturovsky District

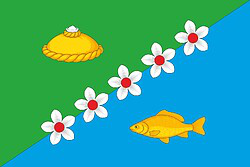
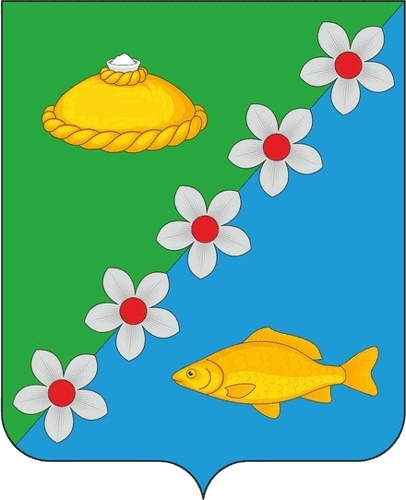
- Flag Coat of arms
- Location of Manturovsky District in Kursk Oblast
- Coordinates: 51°27′04″N 37°07′30″E
- Country: Russia
- Federal subject: Kursk Oblast
- Administrative center: Manturovo

Government
  - Type: Local government
  - Head: Sergey Bocharov

Area
  - Total: 1,010 km^{2} (390 sq mi)

Population (2010 Census)
  - Total: 14,349
  - Density: 14.2/km^{2} (36.8/sq mi)
  - Urban: 0%
  - Rural: 100%

Administrative structure
  - Administrative divisions: 19 selsoviet
  - Inhabited localities: 63 rural localities

Municipal structure
  - Municipally incorporated as: Manturovsky Municipal District
  - Municipal divisions: 0 urban settlements, 7 rural settlements
- Time zone: UTC+3 (MSK)
- OKTMO ID: 38623000
- Website: http://man.rkursk.ru/

Manturovsky District (Russian: Мантуровский район) is an administrative and municipal district (raion), one of the twenty-eight in Kursk Oblast, Russia. It is located in the southeast of the oblast. The area of the district is 1,010 square kilometers (390 sq mi). Its administrative center is the rural locality (a selo) of Manturovo. Population: 11,375 (2021 census); 14,349 (2010 census); 16,758 (2002 Census); 19,994 (1989 Soviet census). The population of Manturovo accounts for 19.3% of the district's total population.

== Geography ==
Manturovsky District is located in the southeast region of Kursk Oblast, on the border with Belgorod Oblast. The terrain is hilly plain in the Central Russian Upland. The main rivers in the district are the Seym River - which from the district flows west to the Dnieper River basin - and the Oskol River which flows south to the Don River, Russia basin). The district is 60 km southeast of the city of Kursk, 110 km west of the city of Voronezh, and 480 km south of Moscow. The area measures 25 km (north-south), and 45 km (west-east). The administrative center is the town of Manturovo.

The district is bordered on the north by Timsky District, on the east by Gorshechensky District, on the south by Gubkinsky District of Belgorod Oblast, and on the west by Solntsevsky District.
