= Sengiley Hills National Park =

National park of Russia

Sengileevskie Mountains National Park
- (Russian: Сенгилеевские горы)
- IUCN category II (national park)
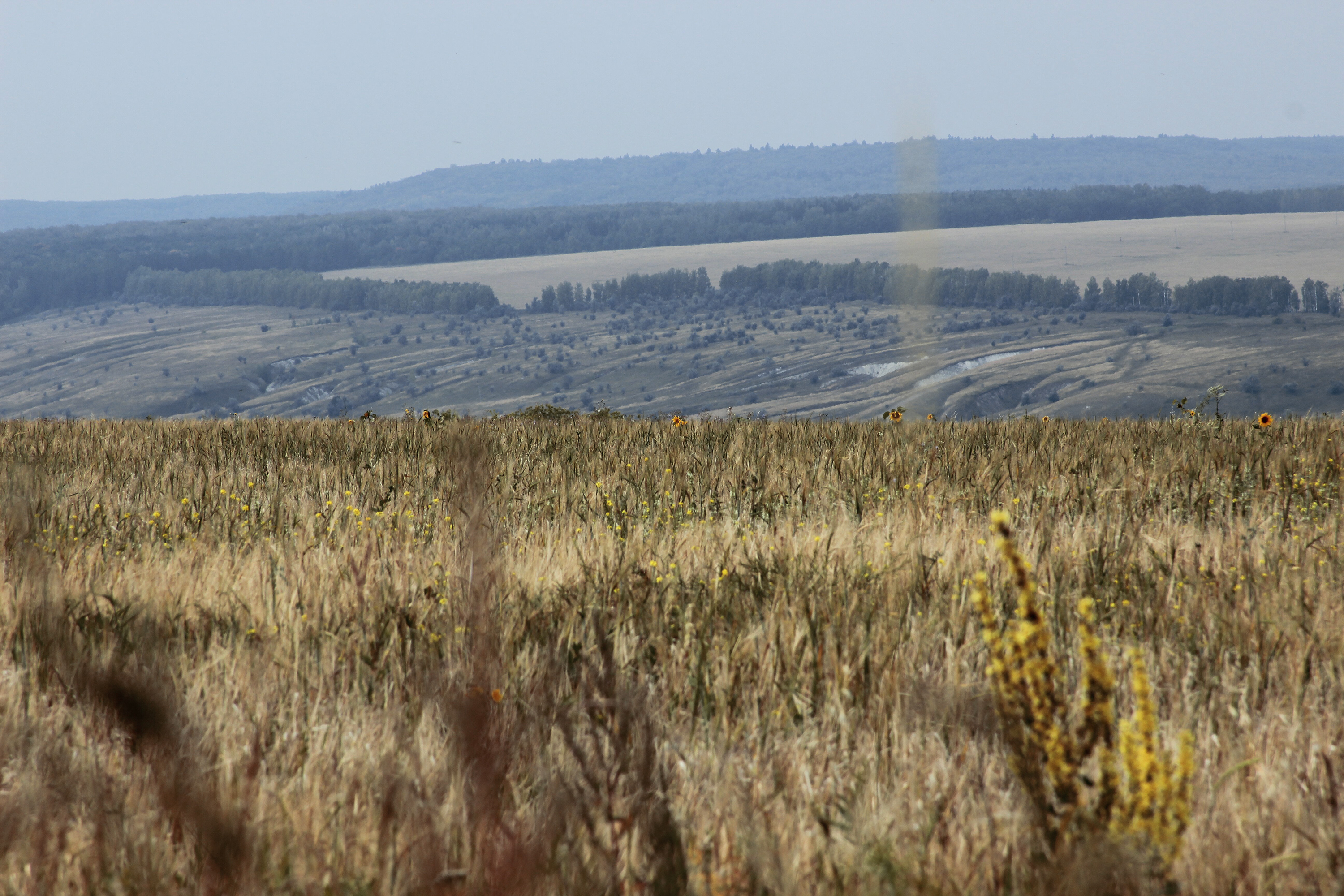
- Sengileevskie Mountains

- Location within Russia
- Location: Ulyanovsk Oblast
- Nearest city: Ulyanovsk
- Coordinates: 54°00′N 48°36′E
- Area: 43,697 hectares (107,978 acres; 437 km^{2}; 169 sq mi)
- Established: March 16, 2017
- Governing body: FGBU "Sengileevskie Mountains"
- Website: http://npsenggory.ru/

Sengileevskie Mountains National Park (Russian: Национальный парк «Сенгилеевские горы») is located in the low Sengiley Mountains area of the Volga Uplands, along the middle Volga River in Russia. The 'mountains' are technically plateau with deep ravines and river cuts, about three-quarters forested. The park was officially created in 2017, with the stated purpose of protecting the unique environment of the Ulyanovsk region and promoting environmental education. The park is located in Sengileyevsky District in Ulyanovsk Oblast.

== Topography ==
Most of the park is on the hilly right bank of the Kuybyshev Reservoir, featuring chalky outcrops and stony forb steppe plant communities. There is a smaller sector on the lowland floodplains across the river. The park has a number of "ecological" trails exploring the biodiversity and rare species of the forest-steppe landscape.

== Ecoregion and climate ==
The ecoregion of the park is the East European forest steppe, equidistant between the Sarmatic mixed forests to the north and the Pontic steppe ecoregion to the south.

The climate of the park is Humid continental climate, warm summer (Köppen climate classification (Dfb)). This climate is characterized by large seasonal temperature differentials and a warm summer (at least four months averaging over 10 °C (50 °F), but no month averaging over 22 °C (72 °F).

Ulyanovsk, Russia

Climate chart (precipitation, max. and min. temperature)
J	F	M	A	M	J	J	A	S	O	N	D
1.5 19 7	1.4 20 7	1.3 32 17	1.6 52 34	1.9 67 45	2.5 74 54	2.6 78 57	2.3 74 53	2.2 62 45	2 47 34	1.7 32 22	1.6 23 12
- █ Average max. and min. temperatures in °F
- █ Precipitation totals in inches
- Source: https://en.climate-data.org/
Metric conversion
J	F	M	A	M	J	J	A	S	O	N	D
38 −7 −14	36 −7 −14	33 0 −8	41 11 1	48 19 7	64 23 12	66 26 14	58 23 12	56 17 7	51 8 1	43 0 −6	41 −5 −11
- █ Average max. and min. temperatures in °C
- █ Precipitation totals in mm

== Plants and animals ==
The park was established specifically to protect and showcase the flora and fauna of the forest-steppe landscape of the Volga Uplands. The terrain is known for Cretaceous limestone hills and ravines. The forested areas are mainly covered with birch, linden, oak, pine, and sycamore, maple, and elm. Over 700 species of vascular plants are present in park. There are 53 species of mammals recorded in the park, with representative species of marmot, elk, roe deer, and wild boar. There are a notable number of amphibians and reptiles in the park, due to the rugged, rocky terrain, presence of water, and relatively light pressure from human settlement.

== See also ==
- Protected areas of Russia
