= Bile Ozero National Nature Park =

National park in Ukraine

- Ukrainian: Білоозерський національний природний парк
- IUCN category II (national park)
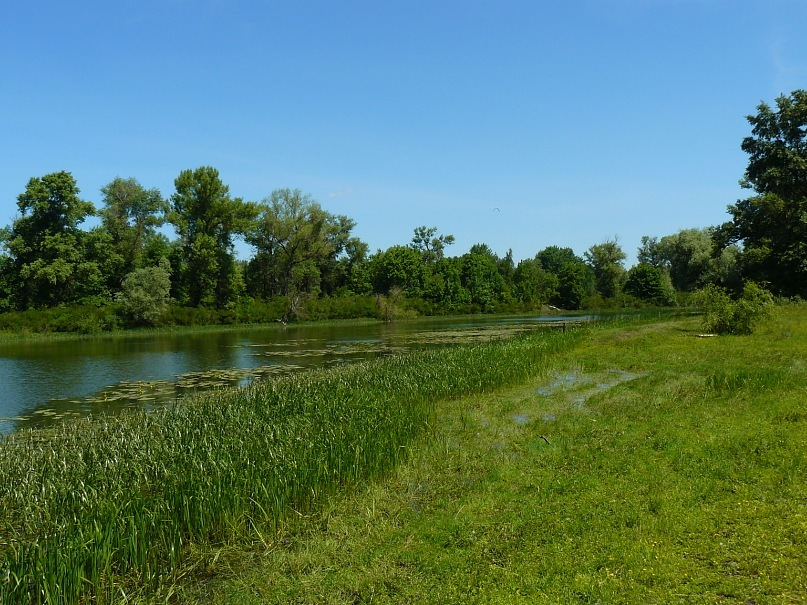

- Location within Ukraine
- Location: Kyiv Oblast, Ukraine
- Coordinates: 49°53′45.5″N 31°34′40.7″E
- Area: 7,014 hectares (70.14 km^{2})
- Designation: National Park
- Established: 2009

Bile Ozero National Nature Park (Ukrainian: Білоозерський національний природний парк, lit. 'White Lake') is a protected area in Ukraine. It is shared between Boryspil Raion of Kyiv Oblast and Cherkasy Raion of Cherkasy Oblast. The park was created on 11 December 2009.

It was agreed in accordance with the established procedure to include 7014.44 hectares of state-owned land to be withdrawn from the State Organization "Forestry Bile Ozero", and provided to the national nature park for permanent use.
