= Striped bystranka =

Scientific classification
- Kingdom: Animalia
- Phylum: Chordata
- Class: Actinopterygii
- Order: Cypriniformes
- Family: Leuciscidae
- Subfamily: Leuciscinae
- Genus: Alburnoides
- Species: A. taeniatus

Binomial name
- Alburnoides taeniatus (Kessler, 1874)

Synonyms
- Alburnus taeniatus Kessler, 1874; Alburnoides taeniatus nikolskyi Turdakov & Piskarjov, 1955

Species of fish

The striped bystranka (Alburnoides taeniatus) is a fish species of family Cyprinidae. Widespread in the Central Asia in Amu-Darya, Zeravshan, Syr-Darya, and Chu River. Benthopelagic temperate freshwater fish, up to 9 cm in length.
