= Ulyanovo, Ilyinsky District, Ivanovo Oblast =

Ulyanovo Ульяново
- Village
- Location within Ivanovo Oblast Location within Russia
- Coordinates: 57°00′N 40°03′E
- Country: Russia
- Region: Ivanovo Oblast
- District: Ilyinsky District
- Time zone: UTC+3:00

Ulyanovo (Russian: Ульяново) is a rural locality (a village) in Ilyinsky District, Ivanovo Oblast, Russia. Population: 12 (2010 census); 24 (2002 census);

== Geography ==
This rural locality is located 18 kilometres (11 mi) from Ilyinskoye-Khovanskoye (the district's administrative centre), 55 kilometres (34 mi) from Ivanovo (capital of Ivanovo Oblast) and 203 kilometres (126 mi) from Moscow. Averkiyevo is the nearest rural locality.
