= Voroninsky Nature Reserve =

Nature reserve in Tambov Oblast, Russia

- Voroninsky Nature Reserve
- IUCN category Ia (strict nature reserve)
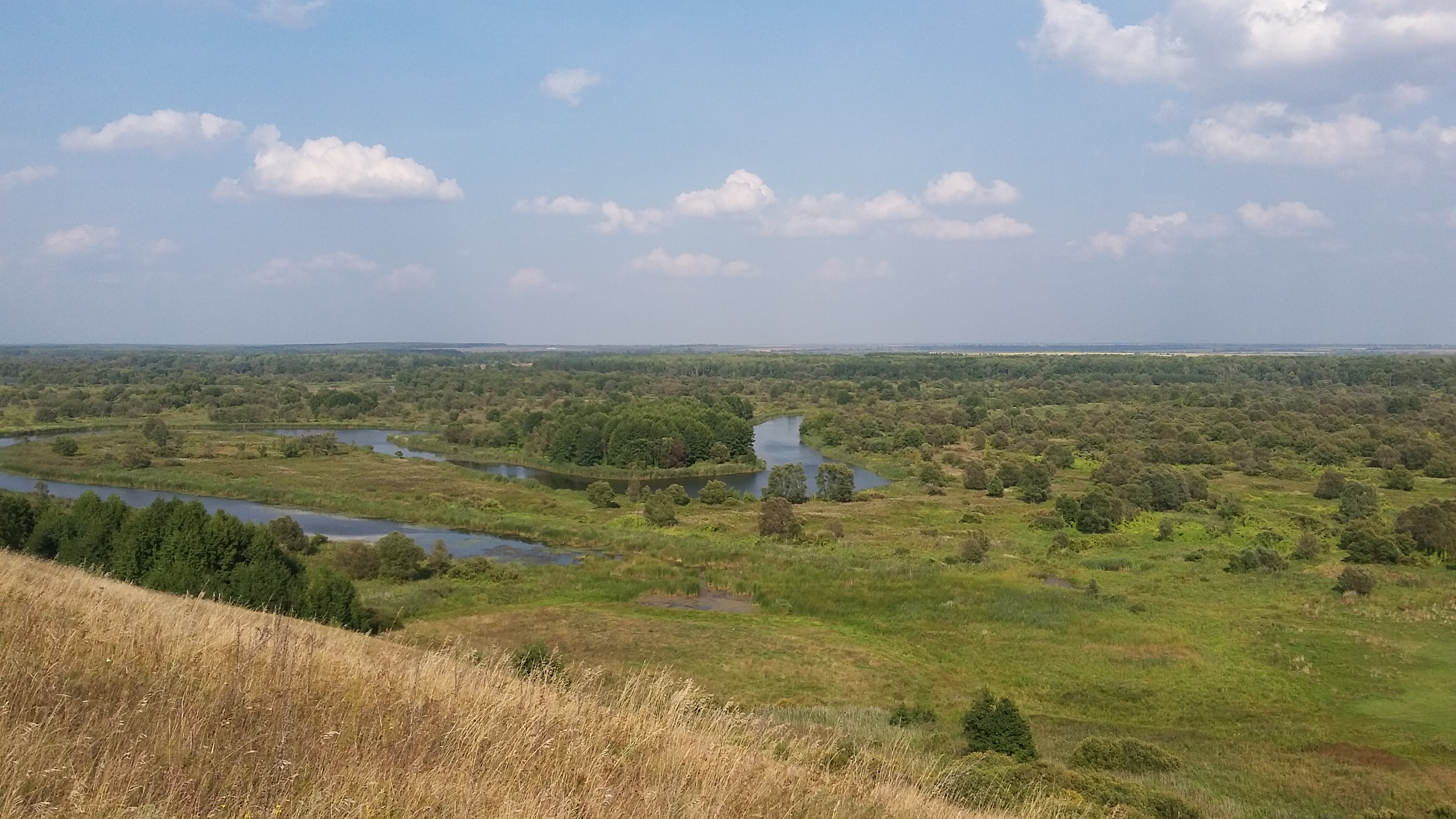
- View from the Barskaya hill towards the Voroninsky Nature Reserve

- Location within Russia
- Location: Tambov Oblast, Russia
- Nearest city: Inzhavino
- Coordinates: 51°31′29″N 42°36′52″E
- Area: 10,819 hectares (26,734 acres; 42 sq mi)
- Established: 1994
- Governing body: Ministry of Natural Resources and Environment (Russia)
- Website: http://www.voroninsky.ru/

Voroninsky Nature Reserve (Russian: Воронинский заповедник) is a strict ecological reserve (a zapovednik) located in the valley of the Vorona River (the right tributary of the Khopyor River), in the forest-steppe zone of southwest Russia. The Voroninsky Reserve protects riverine wetlands in the southeast of the Oka–Don Plain. The reserve is situated in Kirsanovsky and Inzhavinsky districts of Tambov Oblast, about 100 km southeast of the city of Tambov. It was created in 1994, and covers an area of 10,819 ha (41.77 sq mi).

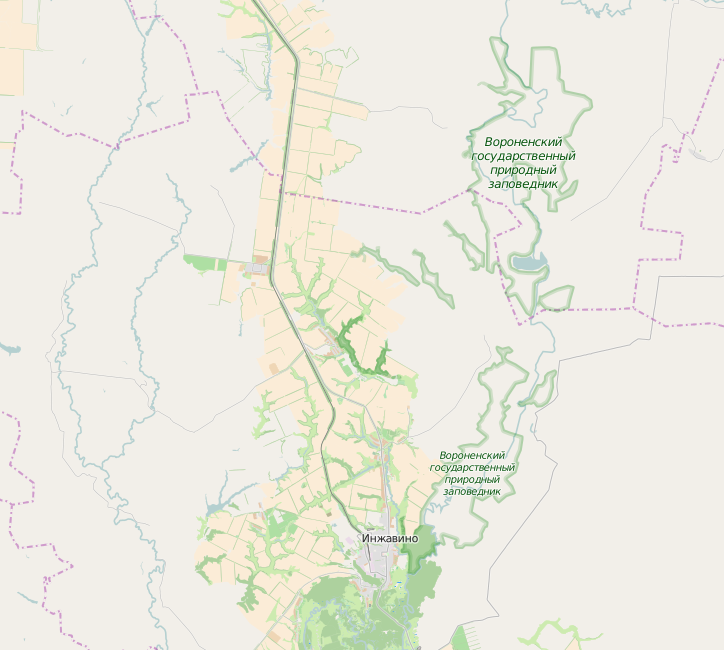
Voroninsky Zapovednik (boundaries darker green).

== Topography ==
The Voroninsky Reserve has a terrain that is relatively flat river valley plain, with some spurs of the Central Uplands. The river valley, of glacial alluvial origin, is 2–6 km wide, and at the most 60–70 meters below the adjacent plateau. The average altitude is about 160 meters above sea level. About 78% of the reserve is wooded, and the remainder is wetlands and open field. The reserve consists of two large protected areas along the river, and 10 smaller sectors spread around the center. The main central feature is the Vorona River, which flows at this point southeast to the Khopyor River and then to the Don. The ground cover is "black soil", with the richest soil in the lowest levels.

The two main sectors are (Official Map):

- Inzhavinsky forest (4,990 ha).
- Kirsanovsky forest (5,330 ha).

== Flora and fauna ==
The floodplain forests are dominated by 100–150 year old oak. In these areas, under-story oak is almost non-existent now as the Norway maple and elm take their place. The slope forests (on the right side of the Vorona) are generally narrow (under 1 km) and contain old-growth forests of oak, linden, maple and elm. The meadow steppe areas of the floodplain are grasslands with extensive nettles at the top tier, and with scattered alder communities. The alder forests have been historically affected by logging and agricultural use, but have been protected since 1964, and were the subject of reforestation around that time. There are poplar and birch floral communities along the old riverbeds.

The animal life of the reserve is representative of the southern forest-steppe.

== Ecoeducation and access ==
As a strict nature reserve, the Voroninsky Reserve is mostly closed to the general public, although scientists and those with 'environmental education' purposes can make arrangements with park management for visits. There are 8 'ecotourist' routes in the reserve, however, that are open to the public; these require permits to be obtained in advance. The main office is in the city of Inzhavino.

== See also ==
- List of Russian Nature Reserves (class 1a 'zapovedniks')
- National parks of Russia
