= Ulyanovo, Vologda Oblast =

Ulyanovo Ульяново
- Village
- Location within Vologda Oblast Location within Russia
- Coordinates: 59°06′N 38°49′E
- Country: Russia
- Region: Vologda Oblast
- District: Cherepovetsky District
- Time zone: UTC+3:00

Ulyanovo (Russian: Ульяново) is a rural locality (a village) in Yugskoye Rural Settlement, Cherepovetsky District, Vologda Oblast, Russia. The population was 37 as of 2002.

== Geography ==
Ulyanovo is located 52 km east of Cherepovets (the district's administrative centre) by road. Maximovskoye is the nearest rural locality.
