= Oka–Don Lowland =

Part of the Eastern European Plain, Russia

Oka-Don Lowland
- (Russian: Окско-Донская равнина) (Also: Oka–Don Plain)
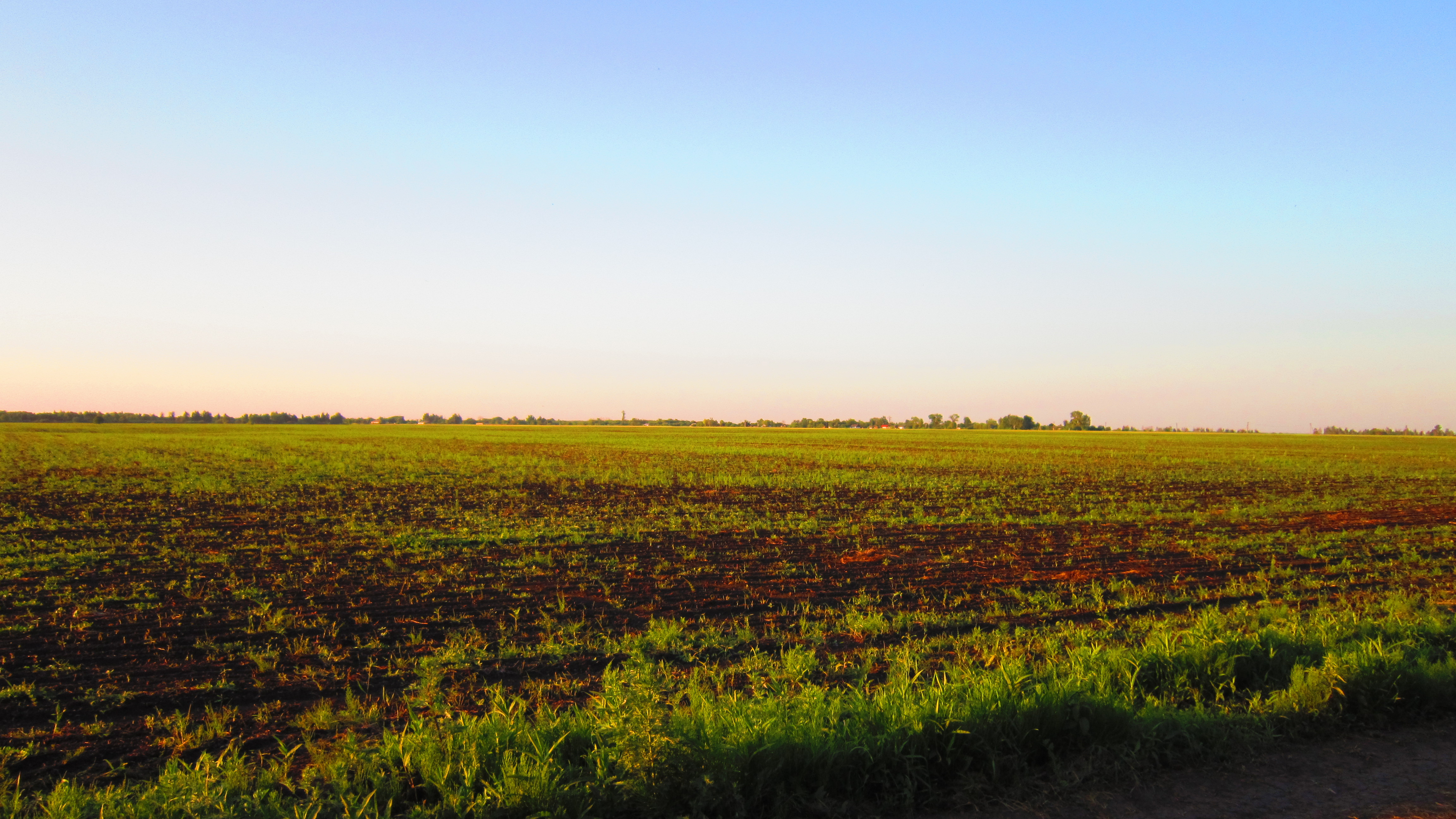
- Black Earth Field in Tambov Oblast, on the Oka–Don Plain

- The Oka–Don Plain is located between the Central Russian Uplands (to the west) and the Volga Uplands to the east.
- Floor elevation: 150 m (490 ft)

Geography
- Location: Russia
- Coordinates: 53°N 40.5°E

The Oka–Don Lowlands (Russian: Окско-Донская равнина) (also: Oka–Don Plain), is a flat plain in European Russia, bounded on the north by the Oka River (and the Meshchera Lowlands), on the south by the Don River, on the west by the Central Russian Upland, and on the east by the Volga Upland. The area is part of the larger East European Plain. The terrain is flat, with altitude averaging 160 meters above sea level, and the rivers meander on broad floodplains. Agricultural use of the plain is high, mostly for grain growing – wheat, barley and rye. The plain provides a flat south–north route for transportation, situated between uplands. Until a line of forts was built across the territory by the Russian government in the 1640s (the Belgorod Line), the plain was a route for Tatar invasion from the south.

== Topography ==
The plain is about 250 km west–east, and 500 km north–south. The central and southern parts are sometimes called the "Tambov plain", and are mostly contained in Tambov Oblast. The lowlands also includes portions of Lipetsk Oblast on the west, Ryazan Oblast to the north, Penza Oblast to the east, and Voronezh Oblast to the south. The soil includes widespread chernozym ("black earth"), with more podzolic ("under-ash") soils towards the north and some sandy regions in the south.

== Hydrography ==
Because it is flat, the major rivers meander on broad floodplains. The main river in the north is the Tsna, which runs north through the city of Tambov and into the Moksha River, a right tributary of the Oka in the Volga basin. In the south, the plain narrows along the Khopyor River, flowing south into the Don River, and the Medevista, which is also in the Don Basin. The floodplains can be up to 20 km in width, with up to three terraces.

== Vegetation ==
In modern times, the plain is heavily developed for agriculture. The primary grains are wheat, barley and rye, with 'industrial' crops such as sunflower seeds, sugar beets, and potatoes. Before modern development, the plain was forb meadow-steppe, with forest groves of pine, oak, and black alder along the river banks. The Oka–Don lowlands include two federal-level nature reserves: the Voronina Nature Reserve in the southeast, and the Voronina Nature Reserve, both featuring forest-steppe habitat along rivers.

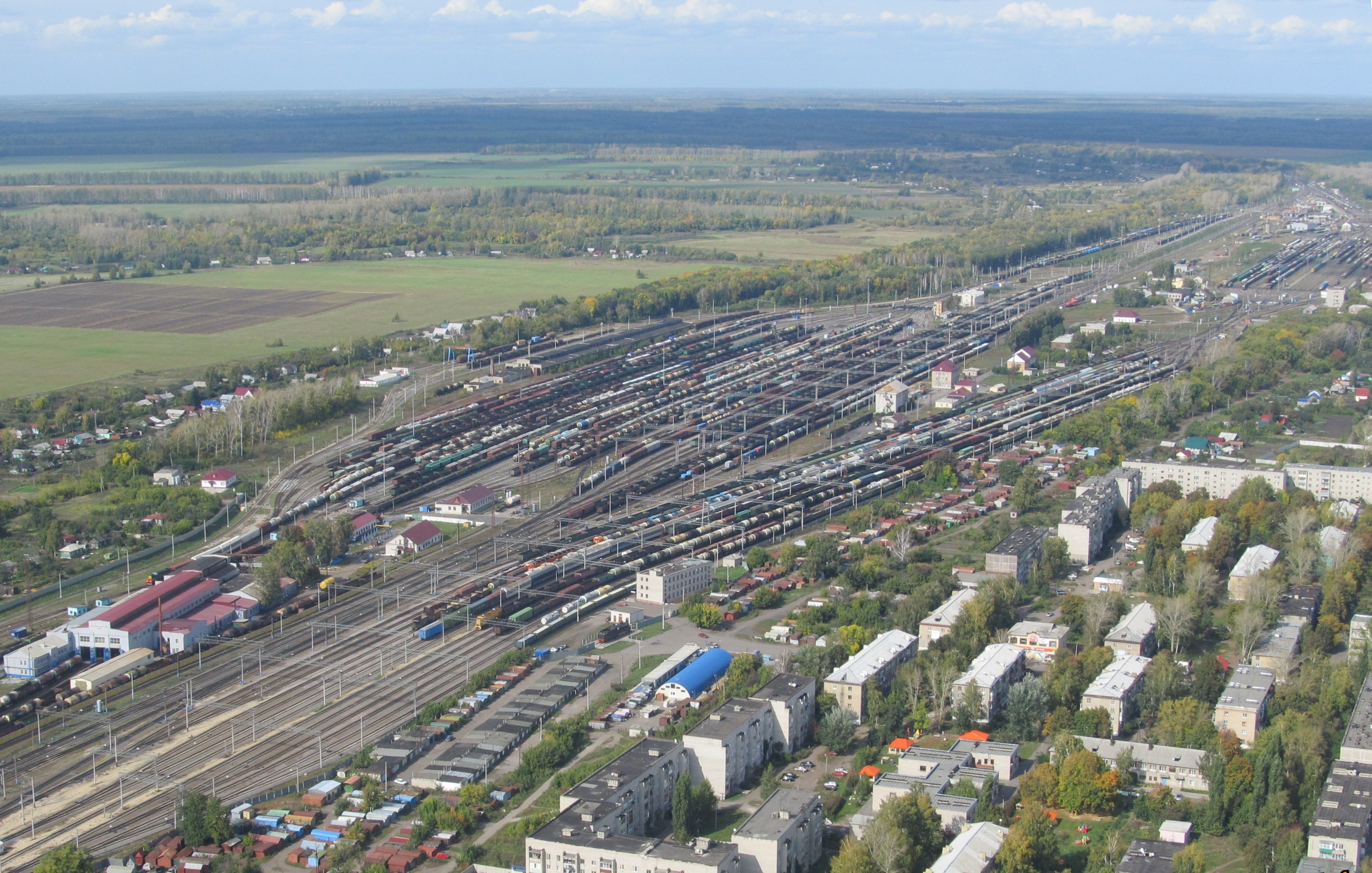
Freight yard in Michurinsk, agricultural center in Tambov Region
