= Dvorichna National Nature Park =

National park in Ukraine

- Дворічанський національний природний парк
- IUCN category II (national park)
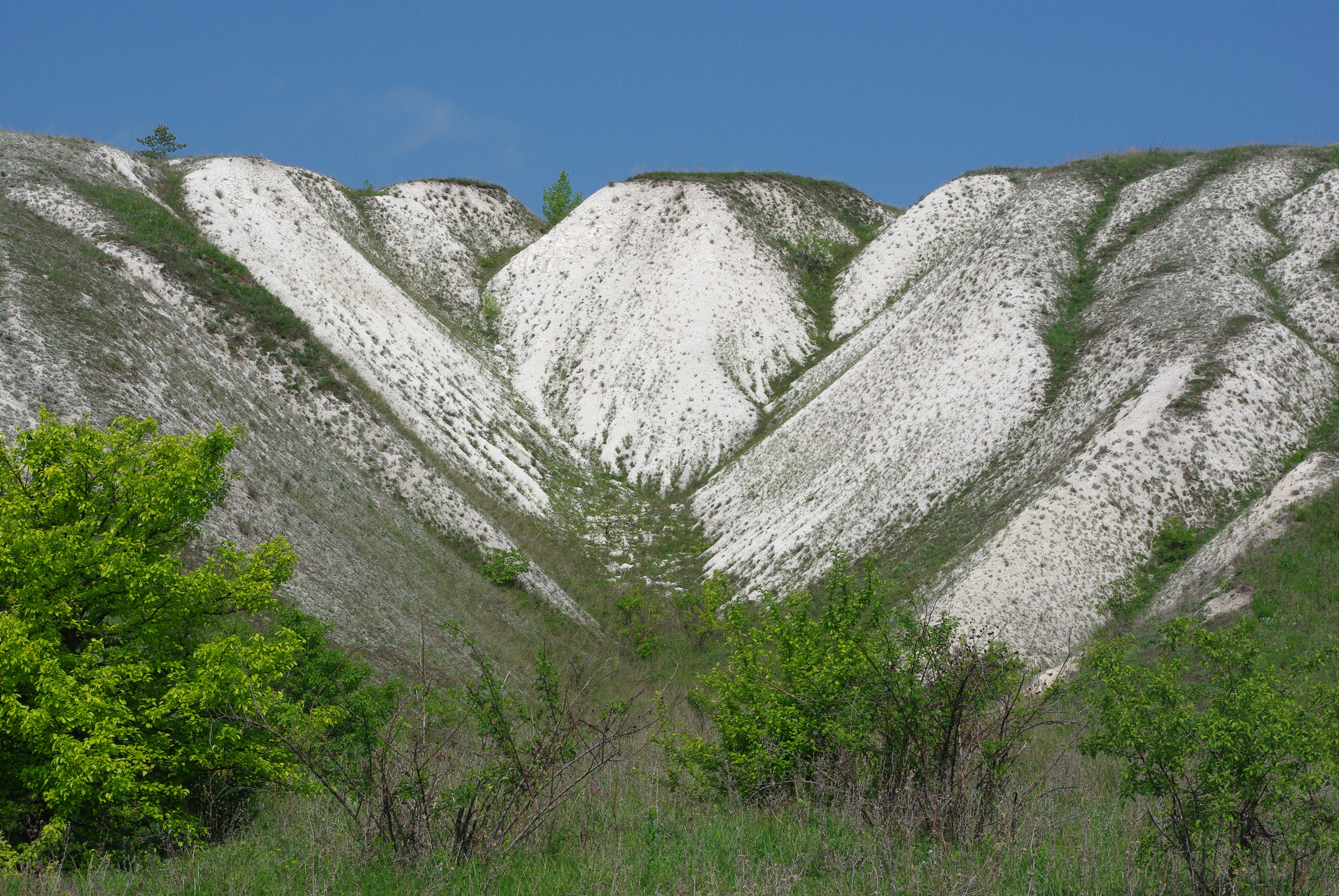

- Location within Ukraine
- Location: Kupiansk Raion, Kharkiv Oblast
- Nearest city: Dvorichna
- Coordinates: 49.8522°N 37.7333°E
- Area: 3,131 ha (31.31 km^{2})
- Established: 2009
- Website: https://web.archive.org/web/20131016144419/ http://inforegion.kh.ua/ru/949:nacionalnji-prirodnji-park-dvurechanskii

The Dvorichna National Park (Ukrainian: Дворічанський національний природний парк) is a national park in Ukraine, on the right bank of the Oskil River, in Eastern Ukraine. It was created in 2009, as a result of a presidential decree. The park is located in Kupiansk Raion, Kharkiv Oblast, near the Russian border. It covers 3,131 hectares of state-owned land.

== Topography ==
The territory has dissected topography, with many valleys and slopes.

== Flora and fauna ==
The limestone rock and soils of the chalk steppe creates a unique ecosystem. The park is the habitat of plant species including Artemisia nutans, Artemisia salsoloides, Artemisia hololeuca, Hyssopus cretaceus, Scrophularia cretacea, Matthiola fragrans, Linum usitatissimum, and Androsace koso-poljanskii. 30% of the plant species are endemic to the area.

The park is home to a number of marmot colonies.

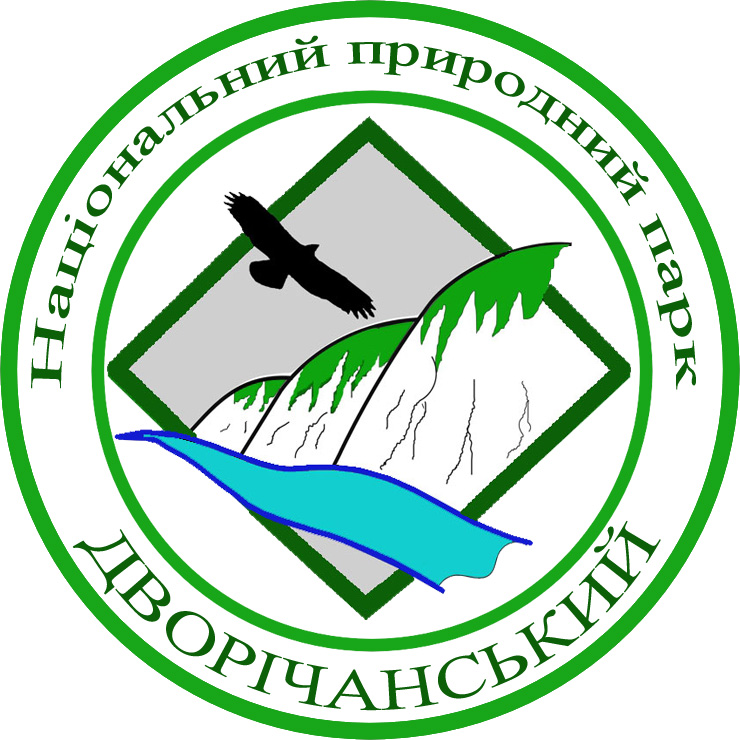
The park's logo
