= Ulyanovo, Kaluga Oblast =

Rural locality in Kaluga Oblast, Russia

Ulyanovo Ульяново
- Village
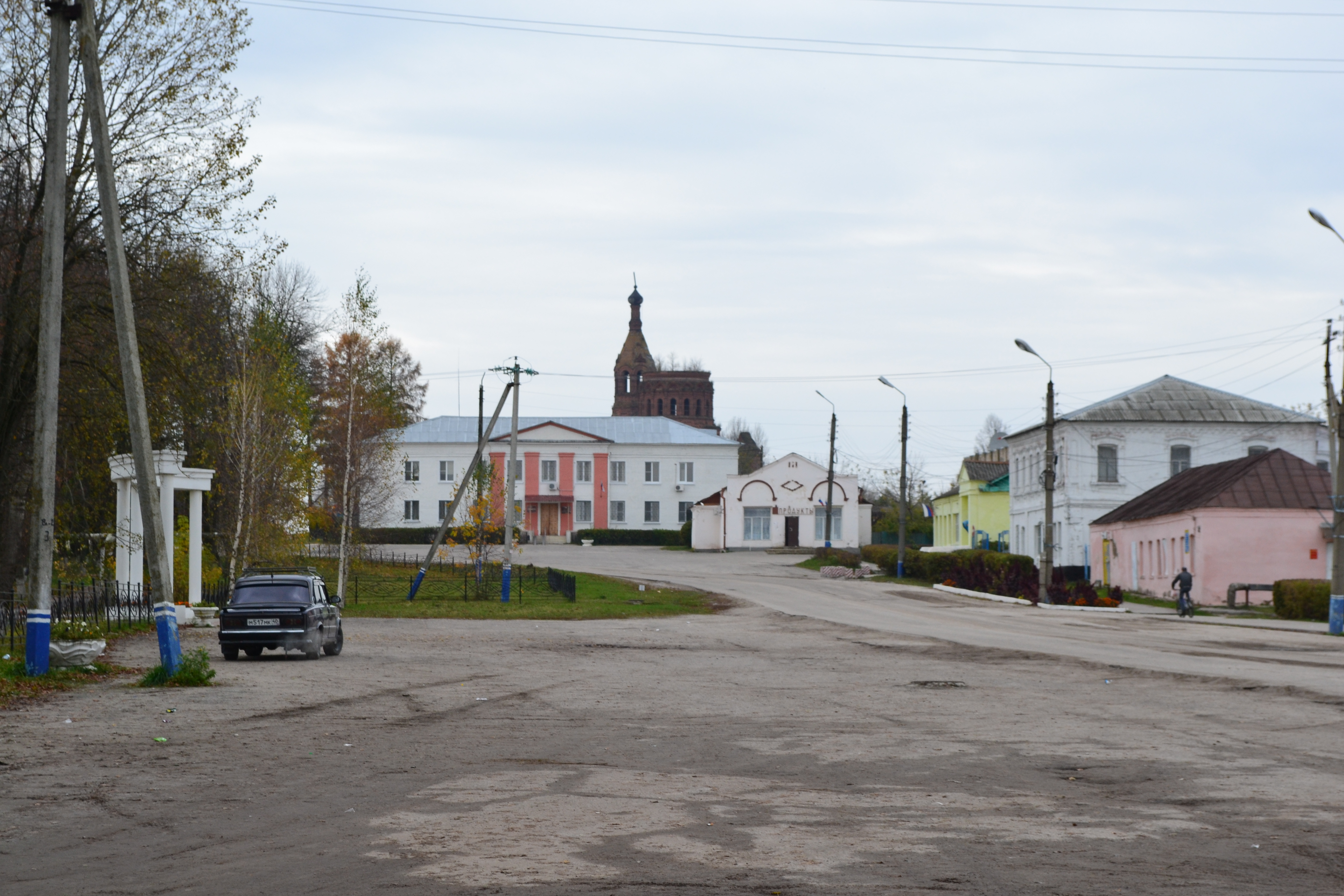

- Location within Kaluga Oblast Location within Russia
- Coordinates: 53°43′48″N 35°32′48″E
- Country: Russia
- Region: Kaluga Oblast
- District: Ulyanovsky District
- Time zone: UTC+3:00 (CET)

Ulyanovo (Russian: Ульяново), formerly Plohino (Russian: Плохино), is a rural locality (a selo) and the administrative center of Ulyanovsky District, Kaluga Oblast, Russia. Population: 3,078 (2021 census); 3,022 (2010 census); 3,085 (2002 census); 3,482 (1989 Soviet census).
