= Karmeliuk's Podillia =

National park in Ukraine

- «Кармелюкове Поділля»
- IUCN category II (national park)
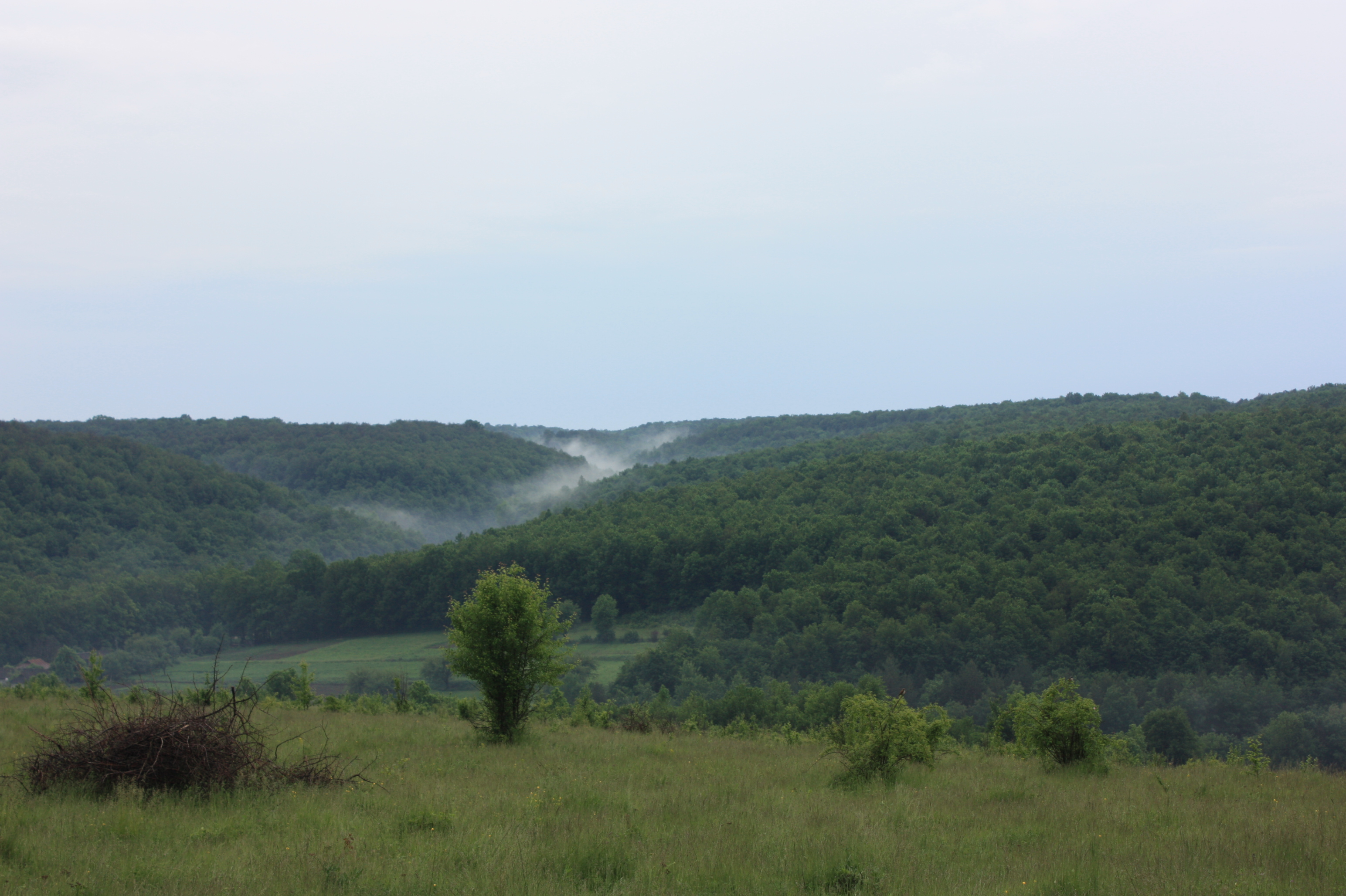
- Landscape in Karmeliuk's Podillia

- Location within Ukraine Location within Vinnytsia Oblast
- Location: Vinnytsia Oblast, Ukraine
- Nearest city: Trostianets and Chechelnyk
- Coordinates: 48.3992°N 29.2603°E
- Area: 16,518 ha (165.18 km^{2}; 63.78 mi^{2})
- Established: 2009
- Website: http://karmelukove.com/

The Karmeliuk's Podillia National Nature Park (Ukrainian: Національний природний парк «Кармелюкове Поділля») is a national park in southwest Ukraine on the forested southern slopes of the Ukrainian Shield. It is located around Trostianets and Chechelnyk of Ukraine's Vinnytsia Oblast and the south-eastern portion of historic Podolia. Its area is 16518 hectares, and it was founded on 16 December 2009. The name is derived from Ustym Karmaliuk, a regional folk hero.

== History ==
The national nature park was created in accordance with the decree of the President of Ukraine Viktor Yushchenko on December 16, 2009, for the purpose of conservation, restoration and sustainable using of its unique natural and historical-cultural complexes of Southern Podillia that have important environmental, scientific, historical, cultural, aesthetic, recreational and curative value. In the National Nature Park, Karmeliukove Podillia, agreed in due including 20203,4 hectares of state-owned land, including 16,518 hectares of land that are excluded from the state enterprise "Chechelnytskyi forestry" and granted National Nature Park in constant use, and 3685, 4 acres of land included in its composition, without exception.

Various associations of plants have been found in the park, among which the hornbeam and beech association stand out, as well as that of Quercus pubescens, basically made up of oaks.

== Composition ==
The national nature park also includes several objects of the Ukrainian nature conservation fund.

- Botanic zakaznyk "Brytavskyi" (national significance)
- Botanic natural monument "Ravine of Tereshchuk" (national significance)
- Botanic natural monument "Romashkovo" (national significance)
- others

== Gallery ==
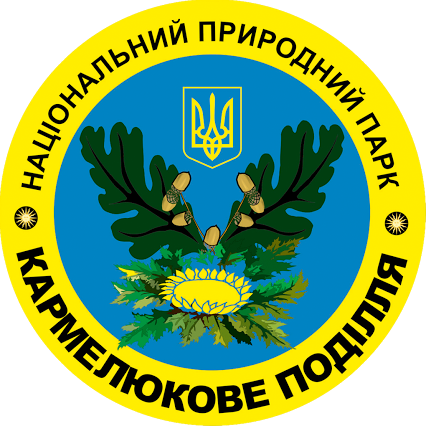
The park's logo

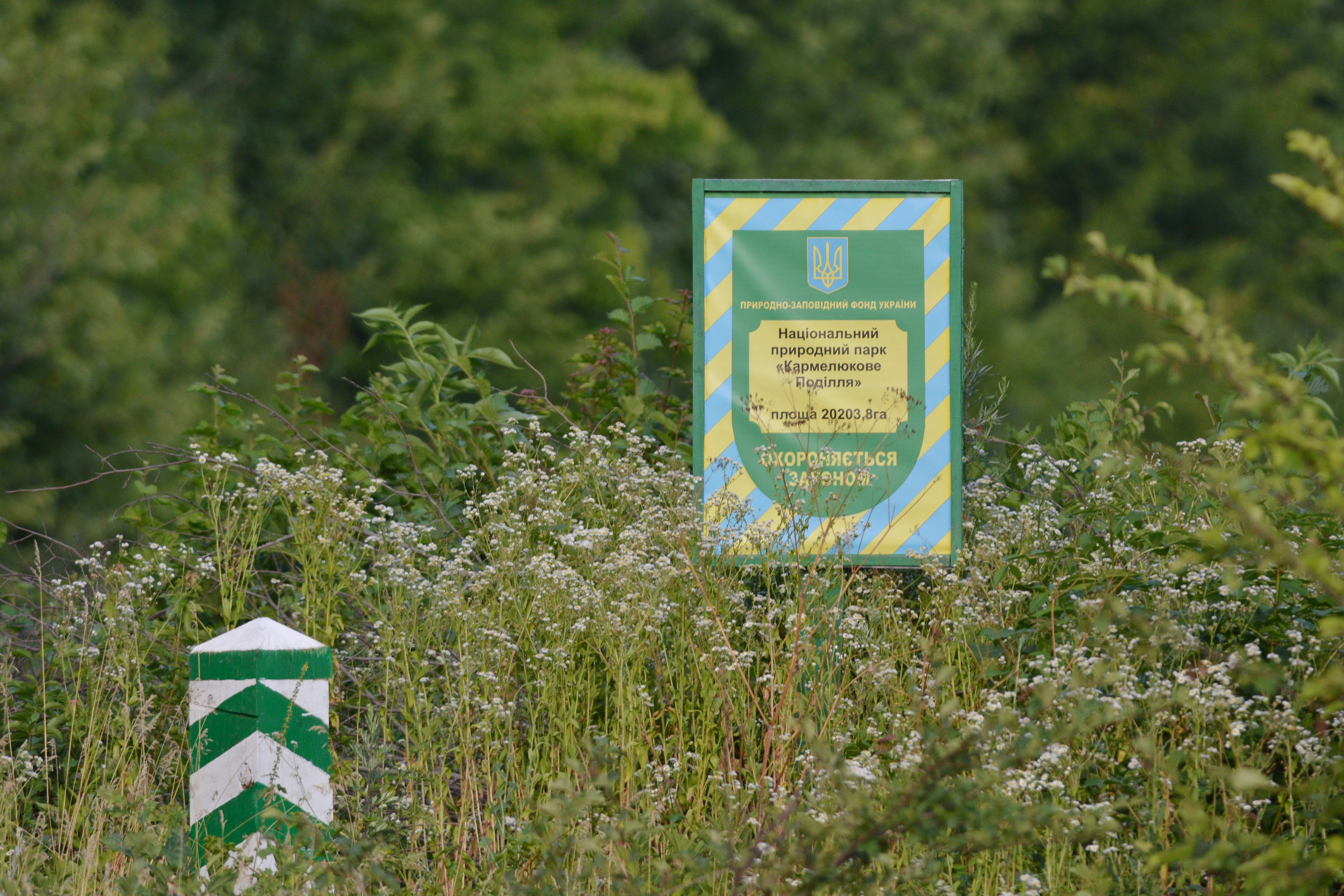
A warning sign that it is a conservation area
