= Ulyanovsky District, Kaluga Oblast =

Ulyanovsky District Ульяновский район (Russian)
- District
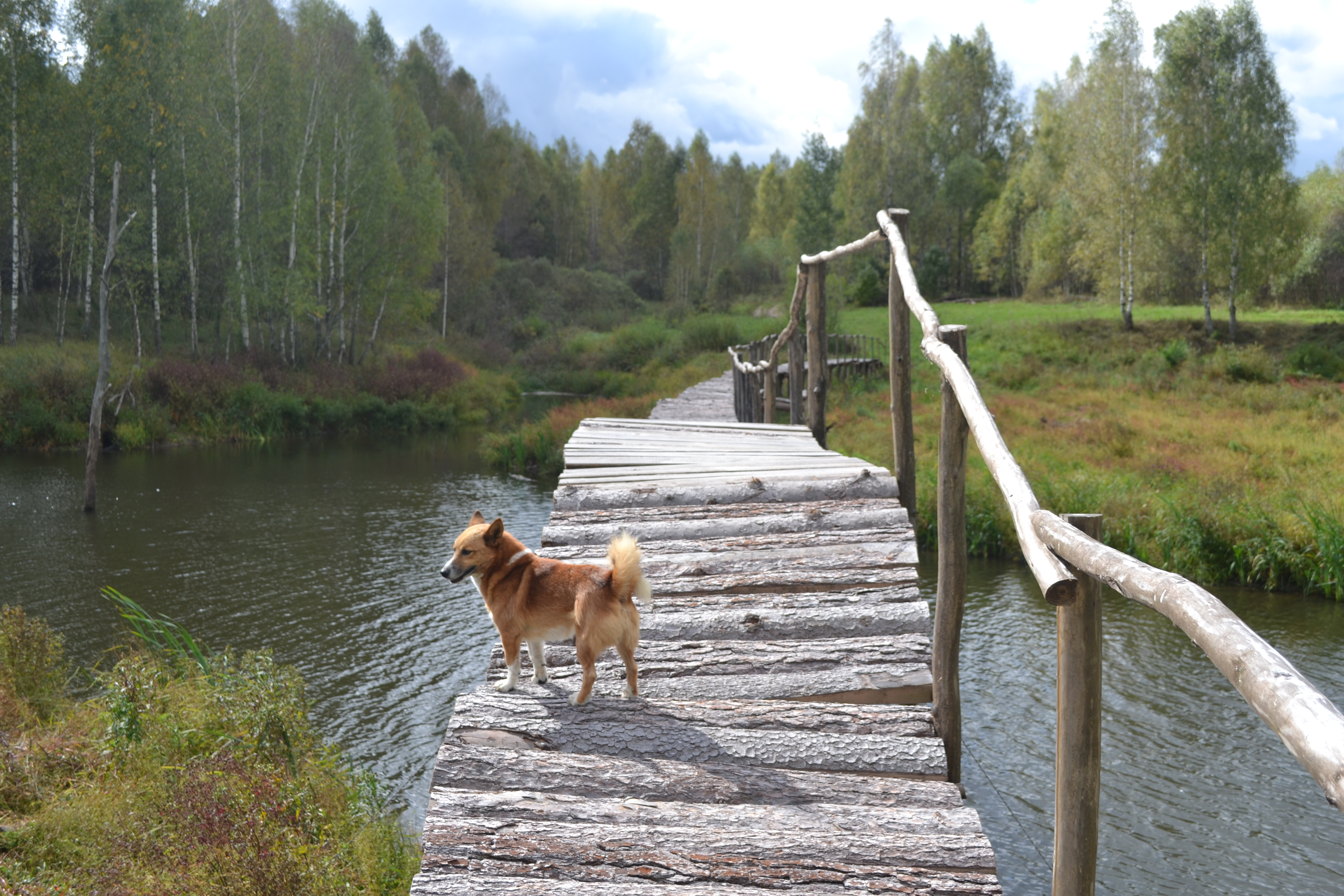
- Bridge over pond, Ulyanovsky District

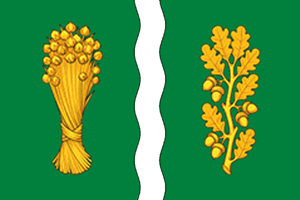
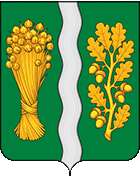
- Flag Coat of arms
- Location of Ulyanovsky District in Kaluga Oblast
- Coordinates: 53°43′08″N 35°32′08″E
- Country: Russia
- Federal subject: Kaluga Oblast
- Established: 1 October 1929
- Administrative center: Ulyanovo

Area
  - Total: 1,655.9 km^{2} (639.3 sq mi)

Population (2010 Census)
  - Total: 7,636
  - Density: 4.611/km^{2} (11.94/sq mi)
  - Urban: 0%
  - Rural: 100%

Administrative structure
  - Inhabited localities: 112 rural localities

Municipal structure
  - Municipally incorporated as: Ulyanovsky Municipal District
  - Municipal divisions: 0 urban settlements, 6 rural settlements
- Time zone: UTC+3 (MSK)
- OKTMO ID: 29642000
- Website: http://ulianovo.ru/

Ulyanovsky District (Russian: Улья́новский райо́н) is an administrative and municipal district (raion), one of the twenty-four in Kaluga Oblast, Russia. It is located in the south of the oblast. The area of the district is 1,655.9 square kilometers (639.3 sq mi). Its administrative center is the rural locality (a selo) of Ulyanovo. Population: 7,058 (2021 census); 7,636 (2010 census); 8,870 (2002 Census); 13,095 (1989 Soviet census). The population of Ulyanovo accounts for 43.6% of the district's total population.
