= Carpathian montane conifer forests =

Terrestrial ecoregion in eastern Europe

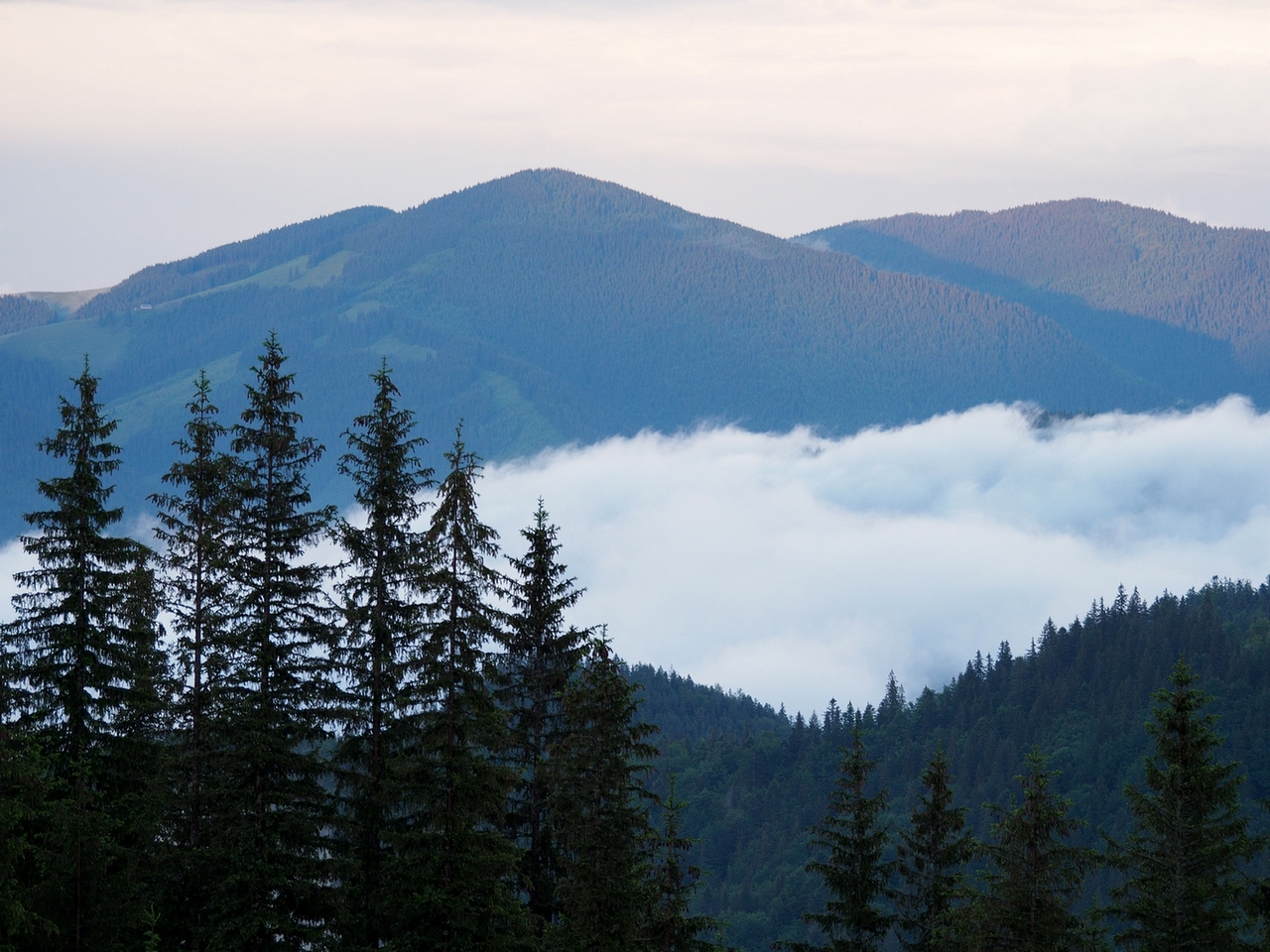
- Carpathian National Nature Park, Ukraine

- Location of the ecoregion (in purple)

Ecology
- Realm: Palearctic
- Biome: Temperate coniferous forests
- Borders: Balkan mixed forests; Central European mixed forests, Pannonian mixed forests

Geography
- Area: 125,337 km^{2} (48,393 mi^{2})
- Countries: List: Czech Republic; Poland; Romania; Slovakia; Ukraine

Conservation
- Conservation status: vulnerable
- Global 200: European-Mediterranean montane mixed forest
- Protected: 29,488 km^{2} (24%)

The Carpathian montane conifer forests, also known as Carpathian montane forests, is a temperate coniferous forests ecoregion in the Carpathian Mountains of the Czech Republic, Poland, Slovakia, Romania, and Ukraine.

== Geography ==
The ecoregion covers an area of 125,337 km^{2}. It is surrounded by temperate broadleaf and mixed forests ecoregions in the neighboring lowlands. The Central European mixed forests lie to the north, east, and southeast. The Pannonian mixed forests occupy the Pannonian Plain and Transylvania to the west and southwest. The Apuseni Mountains in Transylvania form an outlier. The Balkan mixed forests share a small border to the south, in western Wallachia.

== Flora ==
The plant communities in the Carpathians occur in elevational zones, with some variation from range to range, and from north to south.

Foothill forests below 600–650 meters elevation are mostly of broadleaf deciduous trees, principally English oak (Quercus robur), small-leafed lime (Tilia cordata), and European hornbeam (Carpinus betulus) in the northern portion of the range, and oaks – Quercus sessilis, Quercus cerris, Quercus pubescens, and Quercus frainetto – in the southern portion of the range.

Montane forests occur between 600 and 1100 meters elevation in the northern range, and between 650 and 1450 m in the south. European beech (Fagus sylvatica) and Silver fir (Abies alba) are the characteristic trees, along with Norway spruce (Picea abies), European larch (Larix decidua), Scots pine (Pinus sylvestris), Populus tremula, Betula pendula, Betula pubescens, and sycamore maple (Acer pseudoplatanus). Nearly pure stands of European beech occur in some ranges, including the White Carpathians and Little Carpathians in the western Carpathians, the Vihorlat, Bukovec, and Biesczady mountains in the Eastern Carpathians, and areas of the southern Carpathians. In other areas the conifers silver fir and Norway spruce are predominant, including the Tatra Mountains, Moravian-Silesian Beskids, and Orava Magura in the western Carpathians and the Gorgany and Bistrița Mountains in the eastern Carpathians.

The subalpine zone, between 1100 and 1400 meters elevation in the north and 1400 and 1900 meters in the south, is dominated by Norway spruce, with lesser numbers of rowan (Sorbus aucuparia). At the timberline (1400 meters elevation in the north and 1900 meters in the south) arolla pine (Pinus cembra) predominates. In the Tatras the timberline forests are a mix of arolla pines and European larch (Larix decidua). Krummholtz grows above the timberline, with mountain pine (Pinus mugo), dwarf juniper (Juniperus communis subsp. alpina), and green alder (Alnus alnobetula subsp. fruticosa). Above the krummholtz are alpine meadows. In the Bieszczady Mountains there is no Norway spruce zone, and dwarfed beeches transition directly to alpine meadows above 1200 meters elevation. The highest peaks are rocky, with some sparse alpine plants and lichens.

== Fauna ==
The Carpathian montane forests are one of the most sizable refuges in Central Europe for large predators and raptors, including brown bear (Ursus arctos), wolf (Canis lupus), Eurasian lynx (Lynx lynx), European wildcat (Felis silvestris), and golden eagle (Aquila chrysaetos). The Tatra chamois (Rupicapra rupicapra tatrica) is a subspecies of goat-antelope endemic to the Tatra Mountains. Small populations of European bison (Bison bonasus) range free in the Carpathians. Other large herbivores include red deer (Cervus elaphus hippelaphus) and roe deer (Capreolus capreolus).

== Protected areas ==
A 2017 assessment found that 29,488 km^{2}, or 24%, of the ecoregion is in protected areas.

Protected areas include:

- The Ancient and Primeval Beech Forests of the Carpathians and Other Regions of Europe, a UNESCO-designated World Heritage Site that includes several old-growth beech forests in the Carpathians, along with beech forests in other parts of Europe. This area has 93 components, spread across 18 European countries, although only the "Carpathian cluster" is located within the ecoregion.
- The East Carpathian Biosphere Reserve, a transnational protected area in Poland, Slovakia and Ukraine, combining several national protected areas. (2,132.11 km²)

Name	Country	Year	km²	IUCN	Notes
Apuseni Natural Park	Romania	2000	757.84	V	Designated 1990.
Bieszczady National Park	Poland	1973	292.02	II	UNESCO since 2007. Extensions in 2011, 2017, 2021.
Boikivshchyna National Nature Park	Ukraine	2019	122.4	II	
Călimani National Park	Romania	2000	240.41	II	
Carpathian National Nature Park	Ukraine	1980	515.7	II	
Carpathian Biosphere Reserve	Ukraine	1968	6641.74		
Cheremosh National Nature Park	Ukraine	2009	71	II	
Gorgany Nature Reserve	Ukraine	1996	53		
Grădiștea Muncelului-Cioclovina Natural Park	Romania	2000	381.84	V	Designated 1979.
Halych National Nature Park	Ukraine	2004	147	II	transition zone between Central European mixed forests and Carpathian montane conifer forests
Hutsulshchyna National Nature Park	Ukraine	1978	322	II	
Low Tatras National Park	Slovakia	1978	728	II	
Maramureș Mountains Natural Park	Romania	2005	148.85	V	
Muránska planina National Park	Slovakia	1997	213.18	II	
Piatra Craiului National Park	Romania	1938	148	II	Extensions in 1999, 2000, 2003, 2005.
Poloniny National Park	Slovakia	1997	298.05		
Rodna Mountains National Park	Romania	2000	465.99	II	Designated 1990.
Roztochia Biosphere Reserve	Ukraine	2011	208.45		
Skole Beskids National Nature Park	Ukraine	1999	357	II	
Synevyr National Nature Park	Ukraine	2004	404		Some sections UNESCO since 2017.
Syniohora National Nature Park	Ukraine	2009	108.66	II	
Uzh National Nature Park	Ukraine	1999	391.6	II	Part of East Carpathian Biosphere Reserve. Part of Primeval Beech Forests reserve.
Veľká Fatra National Park	Slovakia	2002	403.71		
Verkhovyna National Nature Park	Ukraine	2010	120	II	
Vyzhnytsia National Nature Park	Ukraine	1995	112.38	II	
Zacharovanyi Krai National Nature Park	Ukraine	2009	61.01	II	Includes Zacharovana Dolyna State Park (1978) and Chorne Bahno Swamps (1969).
