= Ilnytsia =

Village in Zakarpattia Oblast, Ukraine

Ilnytsia Ільниця
- Village
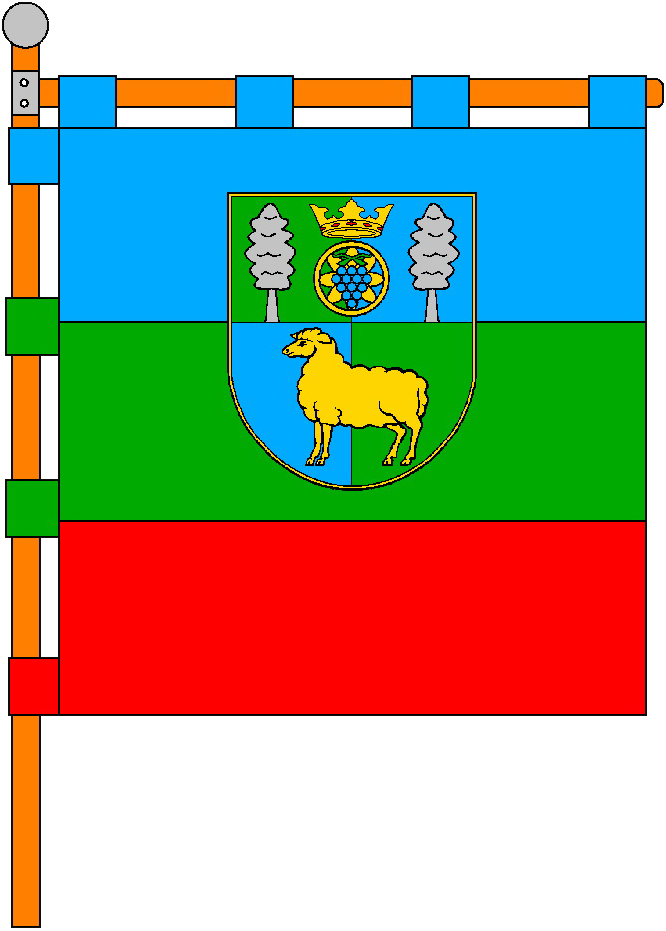
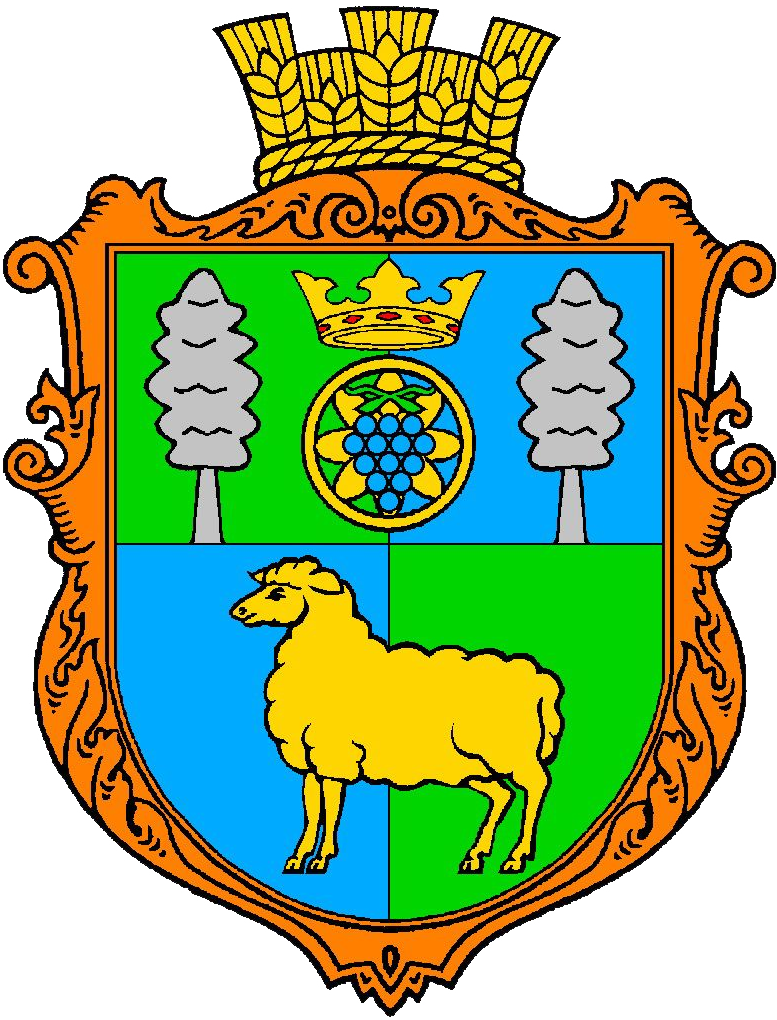
- Flag Seal

- Location within Ukraine Location within Zakarpattia Oblast
- Coordinates: 48°21′10″N 23°4′25″E
- Country: Ukraine
- Oblast: Zakarpattia Oblast
- Raion: Khust Raion
- Hromada: Irshava urban hromada
- First mention: 1450
- Area: 614 km^{2} (237 sq mi)
- Population (2001): 8,902
- Time zone: UTC+2 (EET)
  - Summer (DST): UTC+3 (EEST)

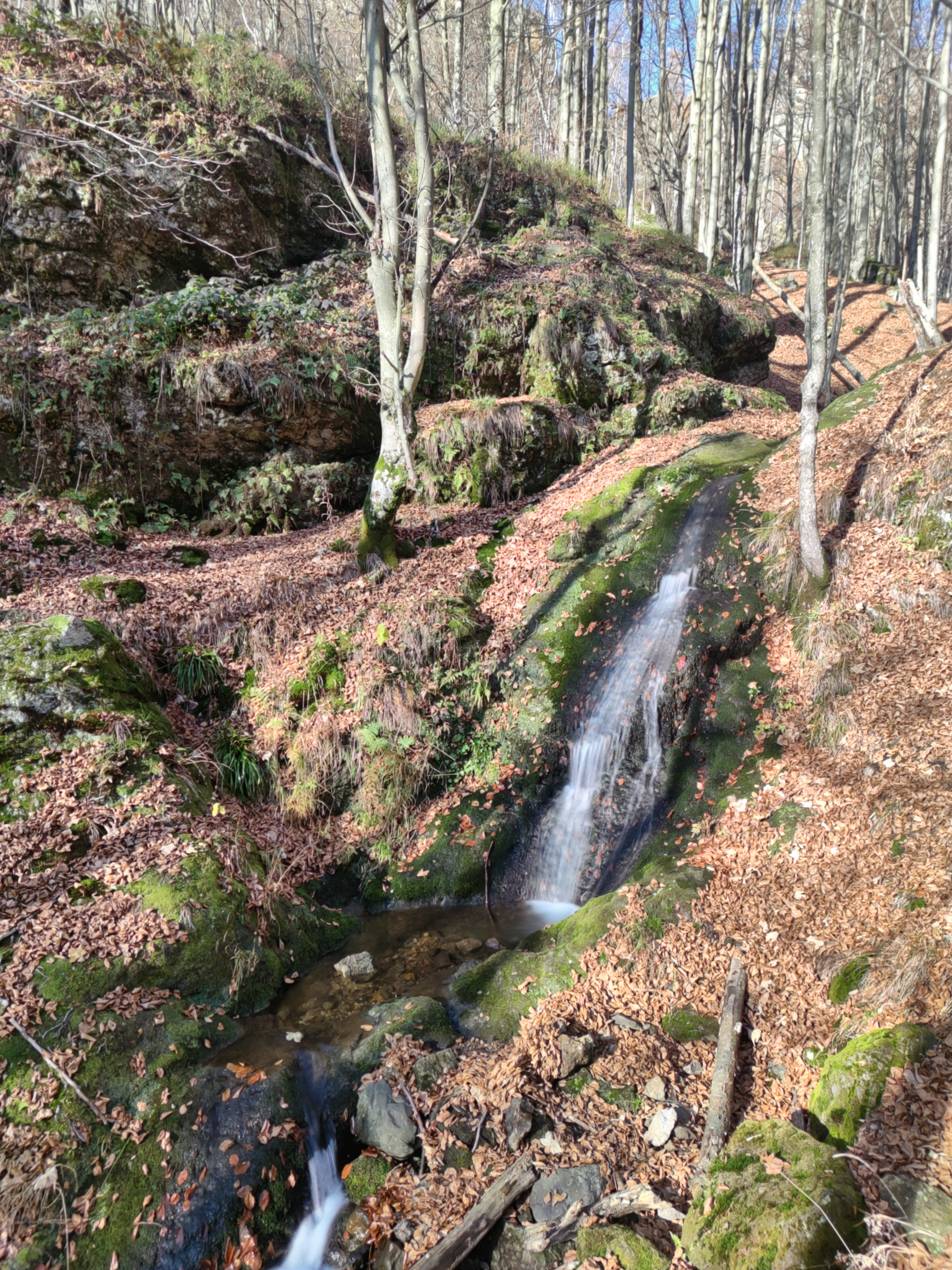
Shumylo waterfall near Ilnytsia

Ilnytsia (Ukrainian: Ільниця; Rusyn: Илниця) is a village in Irshava urban hromada, Khust Raion, Zakarpattia Oblast in Ukraine. With a population of around 9,000 inhabitants, it is one of the biggest villages in Ukraine.

== Geography ==
Ilnytsia is located in the valley of Syniavka river, a tributary of Irshava, at the foothills of mountain Buzhora, 4 kilometers from the city of Irshava.

== History ==
Ilnytsia was first mentioned in 1450. Its inhabitants took part in the Rákóczi Uprising. The main occupation of locals was sheep herding, which is demonstrated by the village's historical coat of arms.

During the early 19th century attempts to produce iron ore were made in Ilnytsia. In 1865 reserves of brown coal were discovered in the area. In April 1919 the village was occupied by Romanian troops. According to the Treaty of Saint-Germain signed in August of the same year, it became part of Czechoslovakia.

Several mines were opened under the Czechoslovak rule in 1933. Between March 1939 and October 1944 the village was occupied by Hungary. In 1945 Ilnytsia was incorporated into the Ukrainian SSR. In 1949 a coal power plant was established in the village. Between 1971 and 1996 it had the status of urban-type settlement.

== Economy ==
Major industrial production of lignite started in the village after 1945. In 1956 460,000 tons of coal were produced by six mines located in the area. After the 1960s only one mine remained in operation. Coal production ceased during the 1990s, but as its consequence the village suffers from soil subsidence and emergence of numerous sinkholes. The village day is still celebrated on Miner's Day, 31 August.

Main activities of the population in modern days are agriculture and animal husbandry. The village also houses factories producing metal welding and lubrication equipment, skin clothes, furniture and concrete blocks. Local farms engage in production of beans, grain, fruit and vegetables.

== Religious, social and cultural sphere ==
Three schools, one boarding house, a lyceum and four kindergartens operate in the village along with a leisure centre, a club, a children's arts school, an ambulance hospital and a summer camp.

Religious communities of UOC-MP, Ukrainian Greek Catholic Church, Baptists and Seventh-day Adventists are active in the village. Several objects of natural heritage, including a national park are located in the surrounding areas.

== Points of interst ==
- Intercession Church, Ilnytsia
- Zacharovana Dolyna State Park
- Zacharovanyi Krai National Nature Park

== Notable people ==
- Ivan Hetsko (born 1968), Ukrainian footballer,
- Viktoria Kovach, Ukrainian combat medic
- Viktor Mykyta (born 1979), Head of Zakarpattia Regional Administration (2021-2024)
- Viktor Pasulko (born 1961), Ukrainian footballer
- Ivan Petrovtsii (1945–2016), Rusyn and Ukrainian poet
