= Irshava Raion =

Former subdivision of Zakarpattia Oblast, Ukraine

Irshava Raion Іршавський район
- Raion
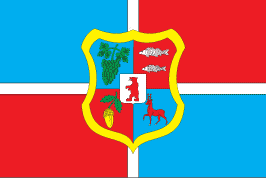
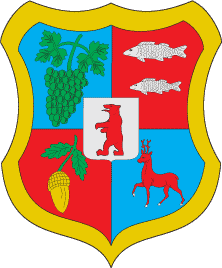
- Flag Coat of arms

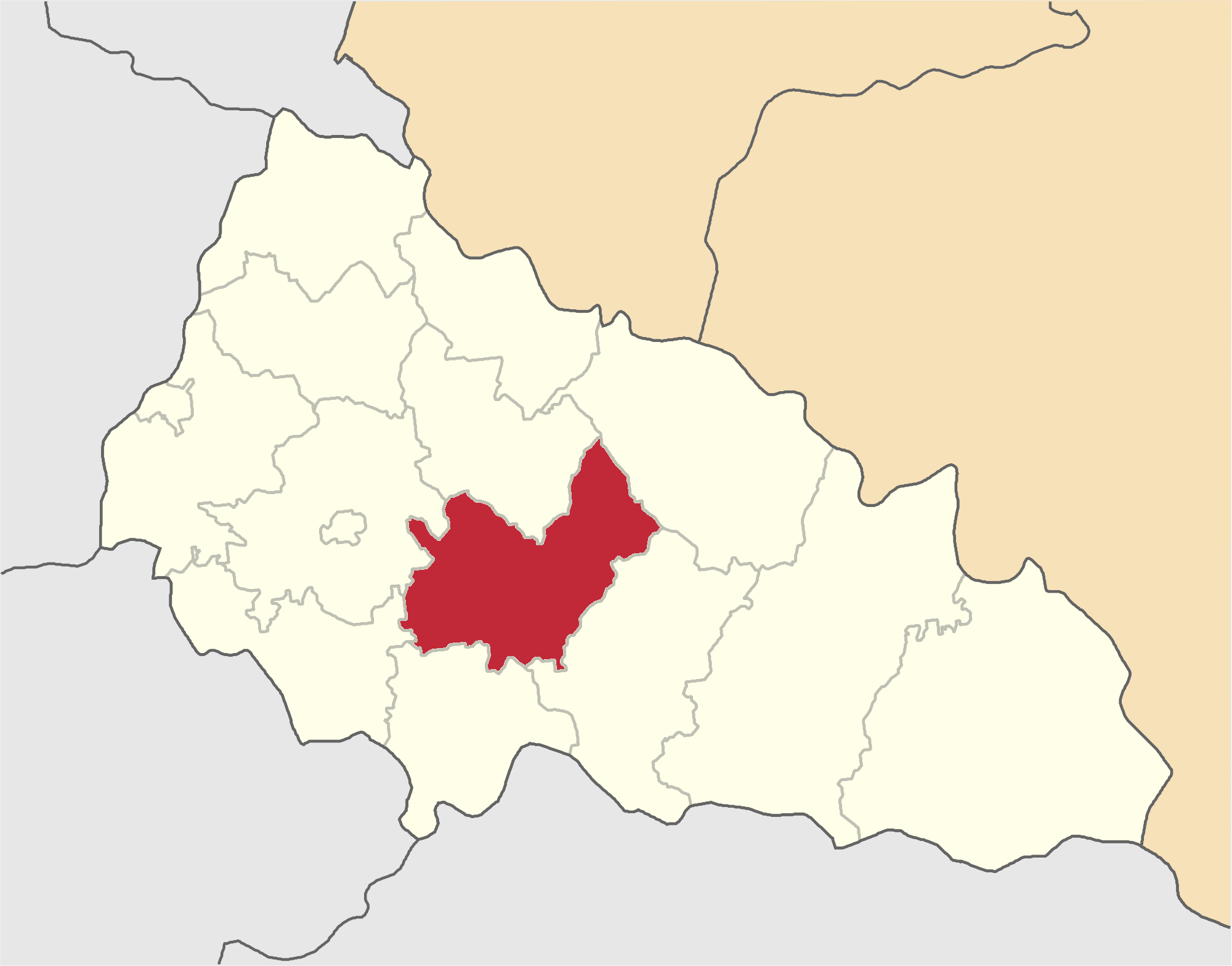
- Coordinates: 48°19′12.61″N 23°1′54.16″E
- Country: Ukraine
- Oblast: Zakarpattia Oblast
- Established: 22 January 1946
- Disestablished: 18 July 2020
- Admin. center: Irshava
- Subdivisions: List: — city councils; — settlement councils; — rural councils; Number of localities: — cities; — urban-type settlements; 46 — villages; — rural settlements

Government
  - Governor: Maksim Mikhaylovich Khokhlov

Area
  - Total: 944.47 km^{2} (364.66 sq mi)

Population (2020)
  - Total: 100,294
  - Density: 106.19/km^{2} (275.03/sq mi)
- Time zone: UTC+02:00 (EET)
  - Summer (DST): UTC+03:00 (EEST)
- Postal index: 90100 - 90156
- Area code: 3144
- Website: carpathia.gov.ua

Irshava Raion (Ukrainian: Іршавський район) was a raion (district) of Zakarpattia Oblast in the westernmost corner of Ukraine. The only city and the administrative center was Irshava. Irshava Raion was situated on the foothills on the Carpathian Mountains. The raion was abolished and its territory was merged into Khust Raion on 18 July 2020 as part of the administrative reform of Ukraine, which reduced the number of raions of Zakarpattia Oblast to six. Also some parts of it went to Berehove and Mukachevo districts. The last estimate of the raion population was 100,294 (2020 est.).

== Notable residents ==
- Viktor Pasulko (b. 1961), retired Ukrainian footballer and football manager, Soviet Top League winner in 1987 and 1989, UEFA Euro 1988 runner-up

== See also ==
- Zacharovana Dolina State Park
