= Viktoria Kovach =

Viktoria Olehivna Kovach
- Вікторія Олегівна Ковач
- Born: Ilnytsia, Zakarpattia Oblast, Ukraine
- Military career
- Allegiance: Ukraine
- Branch: Ukrainian Ground Forces
- Service years: 2014–present
- Nickname: Avicenna
- Unit: Azov Regiment (2014–2015) 3rd Separate Assault Brigade (2022–2025) 3rd Army Corps (2025–present)
- Commands: Chief of Medical Service, 4th Medical Battalion, 3rd Army Corps (2025–present) Chief of Medical Service, 3rd Separate Assault Brigade (2022–2025)
- Conflicts: Russo-Ukrainian War: War in Donbas (2014–2022): Battle of Mariupol (September 2014) (2014–2015); Russian invasion of Ukraine: Kyiv offensive (2022) (2022); Siege of Mariupol (attempted relief) (2022); Southern Ukraine campaign (2022); Battle of Bakhmut (2023); Northern Kharkiv front of the Russo-Ukrainian war (2024–present)
- Awards: UP-100 List of Ukrainian Leaders (Society category)

Viktoria Olehivna Kovach (Ukrainian: Вікторія Олегівна Ковач), call sign Avicenna, is a Ukrainian servicewoman, combat medic, and Chief of Medical Service of the 3rd Army Corps. She previously served as Chief of Medical Service of the 3rd Assault Brigade of the Armed Forces of Ukraine. Kovach is a member of the “Veteranka” movement. She is known for reforming the brigade's medical service, implementing the “chain of survival” system, and training combat medics. Her experience is studied by other units of the Armed Forces of Ukraine. In 2024, she was included in the Ukrainska Pravda list of Ukrainian Leaders in the “Society” category.

== Biography ==
Kovach was born in Ilnytsia, Zakarpattia Oblast.

She studied at the Vinnytsia National Medical University (specializing in obstetrics-gynecology).

From 2014 to 2015, she served as a combat medic in the Azov Regiment on the Mariupol front.

After demobilization, she completed her medical education. From 2018 to 2020, she worked at the Ministry of Healthcare of Ukraine (focusing on medical education), and from 2020, at the private clinic “Dobrobut” (organizing postgraduate training for medical interns).

With the start of the full-scale Russian invasion of Ukraine in February 2022, Kovach joined the medical service of the Special Operations Forces (Ukraine) unit based on the Azov Regiment. She participated in battles in Kyiv Oblast (as a combat medic), the attempted relief of Mariupol, and operations on the southern front.

In August–September 2022, during the formation of the 3rd Assault Brigade, Kovach became the Chief of Medical Service. She formed subunits, developed strategies for evacuating the wounded, medical supply, and training. Under her leadership, the brigade's medical service became one of the most effective in the Armed Forces of Ukraine, emphasizing the “chain of survival” (from the battlefield to return to duty).

== Awards and recognition ==
- Included in the Ukrainska Pravda list of Ukrainian Leaders in 2024 in the “Society” category.
- Nominee for the national award “Woman of Ukraine – 2025” in the “Military Medicine” category.
