= Boikivshchyna National Nature Park =

National nature park in Ukraine

- Ukrainian: Національний природний парк «Бойківщина»
- IUCN category II (national park)
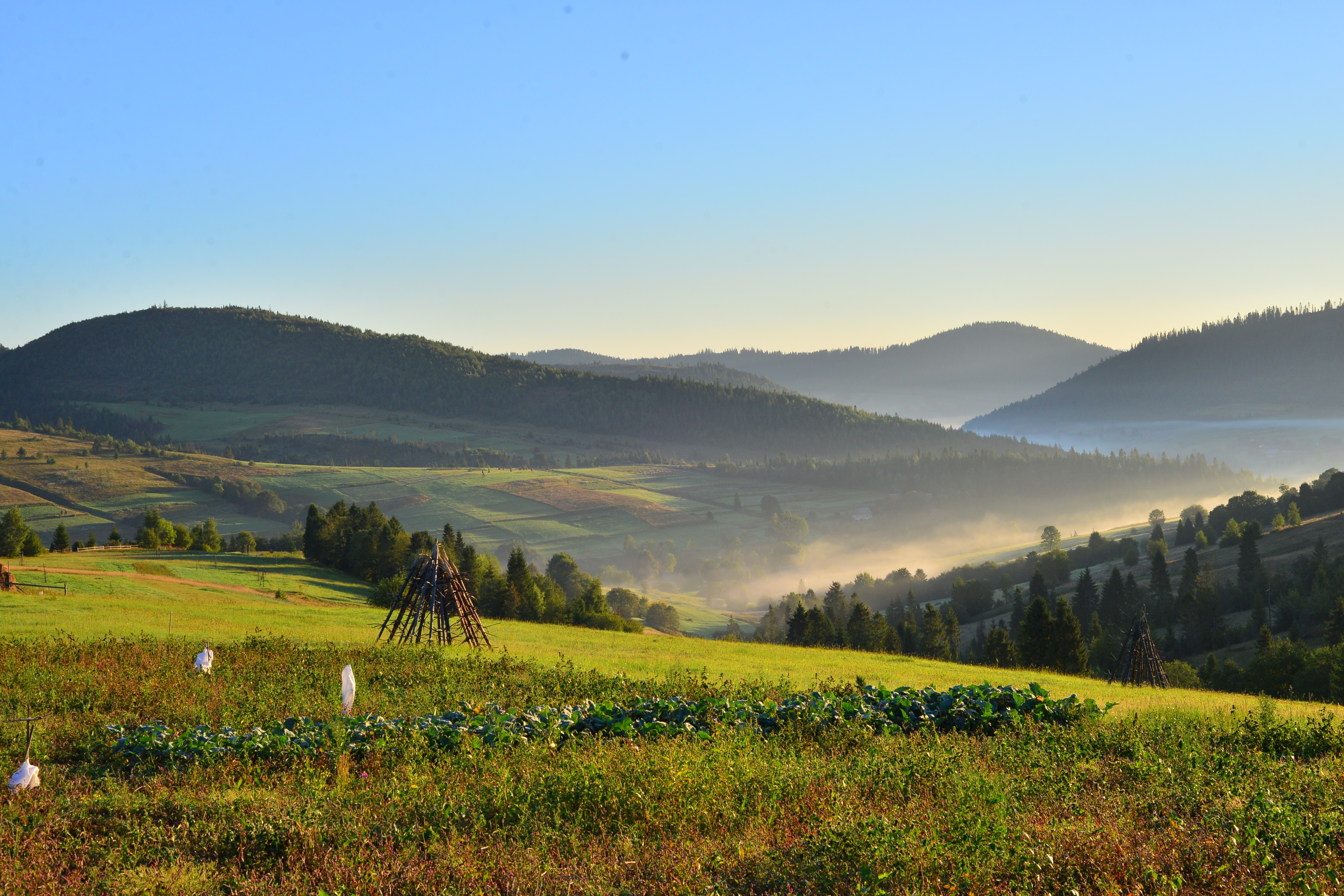

- Location within Lviv Oblast Location within Ukraine
- Location: Lviv Oblast, Western Ukraine
- Nearest city: Turka, Sambir Raion
- Coordinates: 49°04′38″N 22°57′17″E
- Area: 122.4 km^{2} (12,240 ha)
- Established: 2019
- Governing body: Ministry of Ecology and Natural Resources

Boikivshchyna National Nature Park (Ukrainian: Національний природний парк «Бойківщина») is a national park in the Carpathian Mountains, in Lviv Oblast of Ukraine. It was created to protect the alpine landscapes of the Beskids as well as forests in the valleys of the Vododilnyi Range, including the upper Dniester valley.

The park was officially created on 11 April 2019 when Petro Poroshenko, then the president of Ukraine, signed the corresponding decree. It was originally located in Turka Raion, however, after the administrative reform in 2020 the raion was abolished and merged into Sambir Raion.

== Features ==
Boikivshchyna is located in the Carpathian montane conifer forests ecoregion, a region characterized by temperate coniferous forests and mountain ranges in eastern Europe, centered on Romania. The national park is in the Eastern Beskids region of the Carpathian Mountains. The area is heavily wooded, featuring swathes of fir and spruce.

The highest mountain in Lviv Oblast, Pikui is within the bounds of the park. The source for the Stryi, which feeds into the Dniester can be found in the park off a maintained walking trail.

== See also ==
- National parks of Ukraine
