= Viktor Mykyta =

Ukrainian politician

- Віктор Микита
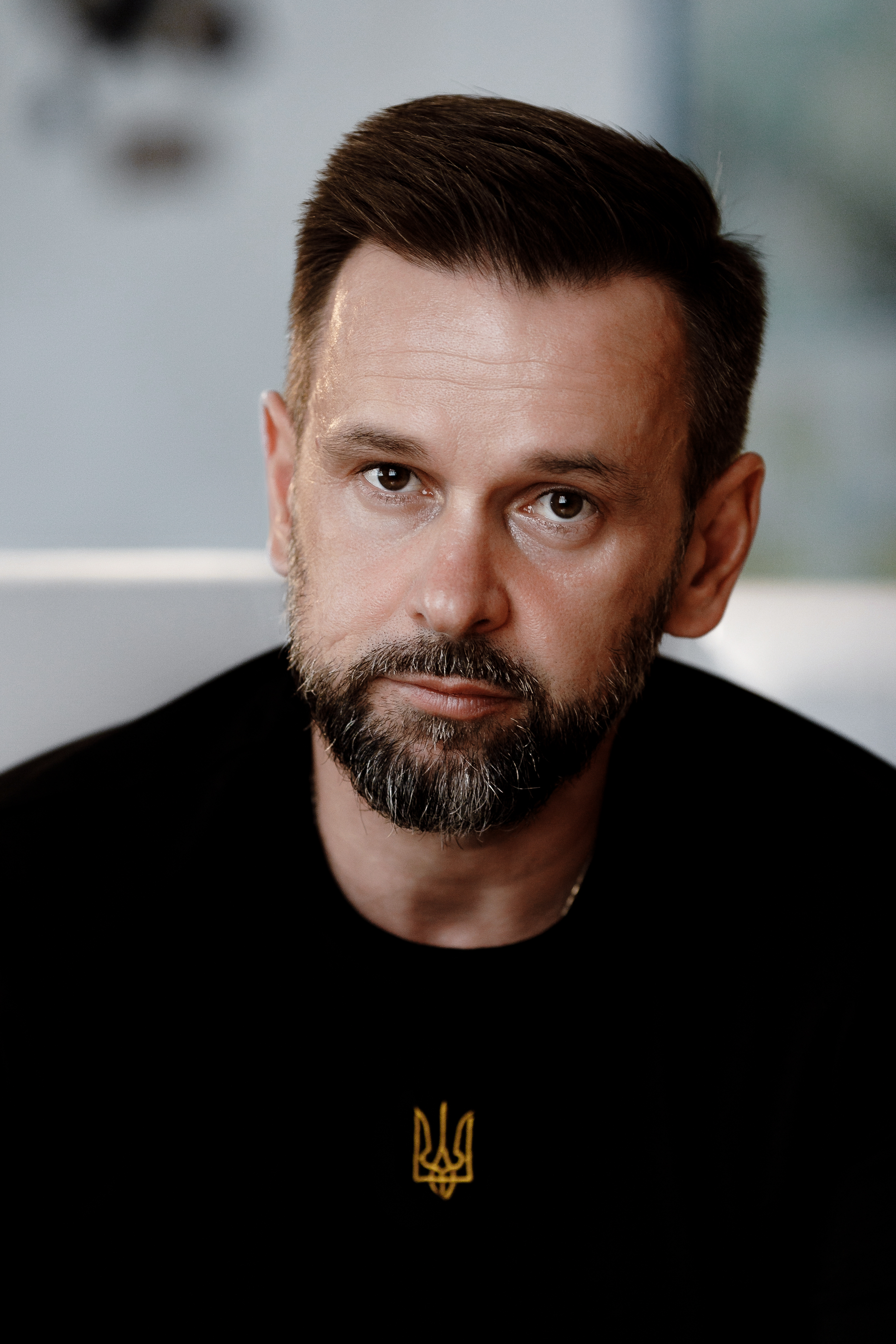
- Mykyta in 2023

Governor of Zakarpattia Oblast
- In office 10 December 2021 – 8 September 2024
- President: Volodymyr Zelenskyy
- Prime Minister: Denys Shmyhal
- Preceded by: Petro Dobromilskyi
- Succeeded by: Myroslav Biletskyi

Personal details
- Born: Viktor Fedorovych Mykyta; 4 February 1979 (age 47) Ilnytsia, Zakarpattia Oblast, Ukrainian SSR, Soviet Union
- Party: Servant of the People

Viktor Fedorovych Mykyta (Ukrainian: Віктор Федорович Микита; born 4 February 1979) is a Ukrainian public figure, politician who served as Zakarpattia Oblast State Administration from 10 December 2021 to 8 September 2024. He also serves as the Chairman of the Chamber of Regions of the Congress of Local and Regional Authorities under the President of Ukraine, and the head of the Zakarpattia Oblast organization of the political party "Servant of the People".

== Biography ==
Viktor Fedorovych Mykyta was born on 4 February 1979, in the village of Ilnytsia, Khustskyi District, Zakarpattia Oblast.

In 1998, he graduated from the Zakarpattia Forestry Technical College with a degree in "Technology, Economics, and Planning of Woodworking."

From 1999 to 2002, he worked in various enterprises, including the postal service, utilizing his expertise in the field. He also worked as a lawyer in a private company.

In 2002, Mykyta completed his studies in "Jurisprudence" at the National Academy of Internal Affairs of Ukraine.

=== Activity in the field of national security ===
Since 2003, Mykyta has been employed in law enforcement agencies. He served as the Deputy Chief of the Security Service of Ukraine in the Zaporizhia Oblast and held a responsible position in the central apparatus of the Security Service of Ukraine.

From 2013 to 2014, he served in Donetsk.

From 2015 to 2018, Mykyta was the head of the special unit of the Security Service of Ukraine in Zakarpattia Oblast, specializing in combating organized crime.

From 2018 to 2021, he held the position of head of the special unit of the Security Service of Ukraine in Zaporizhia Oblast, also focusing on combating organized crime.

In 2021, he became the First Deputy Chief of the Security Service of Ukraine Main Directorate.

=== Activity as the head of the Zakarpattia Oblast State Administration ===
On 10 December 2021, Mykyta was appointed as the head of the Zakarpattia Oblast State Administration.

On 24 February 2023, he became the head of the Zakarpattia Oblast Military Administration, according to the President's Decree, regarding the establishment of military administrations.

Since 2022 full-scale Russian invasion of Ukraine, Mykyta has been actively involved in supporting and providing material and technical resources to military units.

He is the only head of a military administration in Ukraine who visited the soldiers during the Battle of Bakhmut.

On 6 September 2023 the Shmyhal Government decided on the dismissal of Mykyta as head of the Zakarpattia Oblast State Administration. In Ukraine the heads of local state administrations are appointed and dismissed by the President of Ukraine on the submission of the Cabinet of Ministers of Ukraine for the term of office of the head of the state. On 8 September 2024 he was appointed deputy head of Office of the President of Ukraine subjugated to Andriy Yermak.

== Projects and Initiatives ==
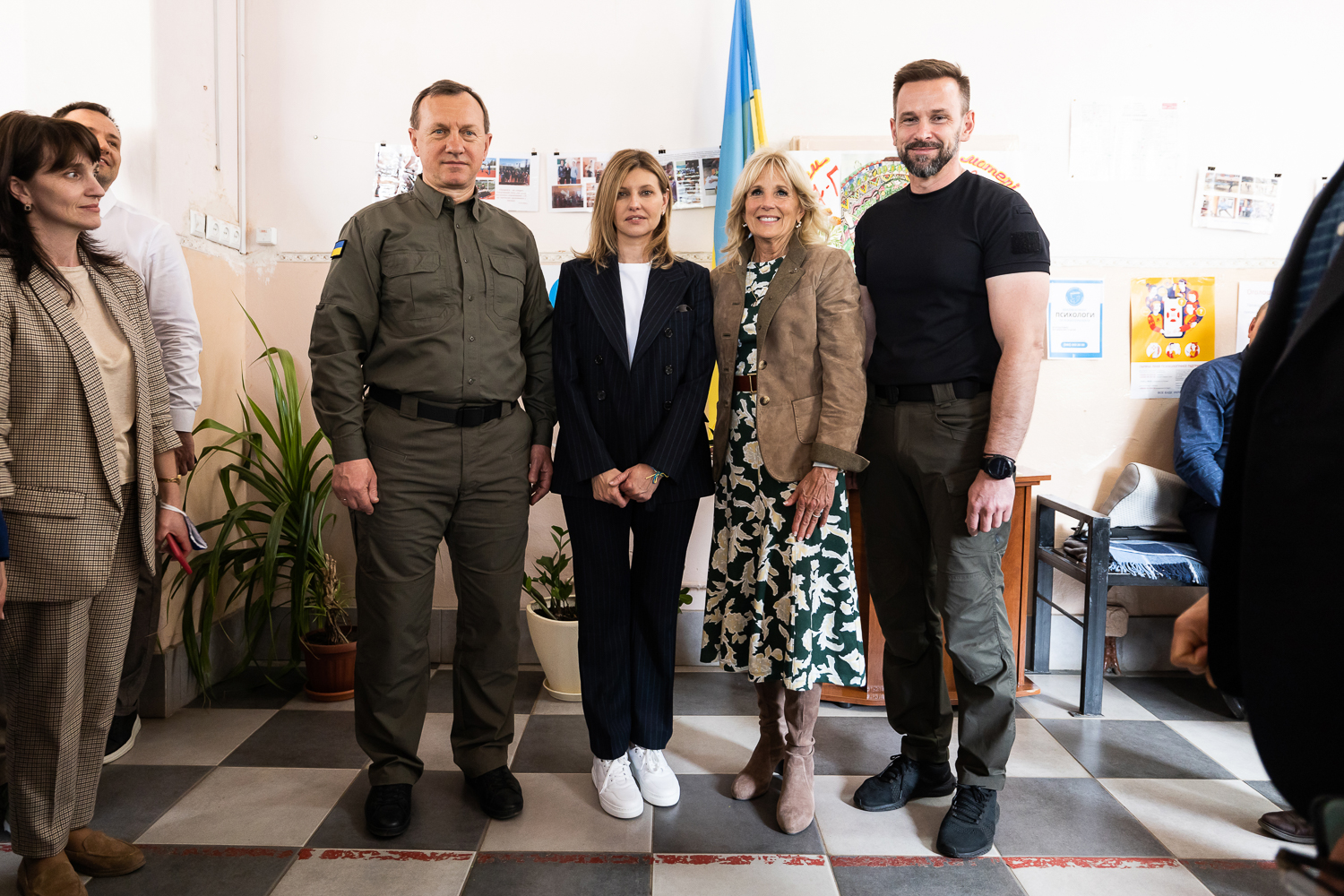
Mykyta (far-right) with First Lady of Ukraine Olena Zelenska and First Lady of the United States Jill Biden

Initiated the establishment of the first Center for Population Training for National Resistance in Zakarpattia, which is the first of its kind in Ukraine.

Contributed to the development of the regional program for compensating interest rates (3%) on housing loans for servicemen of the Armed Forces of Ukraine (under contract) from 2023 to 2027, within the framework of the "YeOselya" affordable mortgage project, successfully implemented in the region.

He implemented the development and integration of a program for moral-psychological support and leisure organization for servicemen stationed in permanent locations in the region. Various activities were carried out as part of the program to rejuvenate and support the defenders and their families.

Initiated the development and integration of the first support program for sheep breeding in Ukraine, as well as the establishment of the Association of Shepherds. The program aims to increase the sheep population, restore sheep breeding, create new job opportunities, and more.

Initiated the creation of the first IT cluster in the region. This initiative has generated ideas and projects for the region's development in various areas, including education, smart programs for optimizing governance and security components.

Initiated the establishment of the regional information and reference portal "Dopomoha Zakarpattya" (Assistance to Zakarpattia). The portal provides comprehensive information on vacancies, humanitarian aid, housing, business support, assistance to the Armed Forces of Ukraine, social protection, and support for veterans and their families.

Was the initiator of the creation of the first "land bank" in Ukraine for business relocation and housing construction for veterans. The project involves construction companies building residential buildings on state-owned land and providing a certain number of apartments to the state free of charge to meet the needs of veterans.

Launched a project in collaboration with the United Nations to provide financial support to internally displaced persons. This project provided additional financial assistance of 2200 hryvnias to the relevant category of people.

Implemented the relocation of over 400 enterprises from areas of active combat.

Initiated and facilitated the relocation of more than 100 IT companies and 30,000 employees in this industry to Zakarpattia.

== Political career ==
Since September 2022, he has been elected as the head of the Zakarpattia Regional Organization of the political party "Servant of the People."

On 3 March 2023, he was elected as the head of the Chamber of Regions of the Congress of Local and Regional Authorities under the President of Ukraine.

== Personal life ==
Victor Mykyta is married and has four children.

== Military rank ==
Mykyta is a colonel of the Security Service of Ukraine.

== International activities ==
2022 – During the full-scale war, he signed an agreement on cooperation with the head of the government of Burgenland, Republic of Austria, Hans Peter Doskozil. This agreement was the first of its kind in Ukraine during a state of war and ensured the supply of special transport, humanitarian aid, and recuperation for thousands of children from regions affected by active combat from a neutral country.

2023 – Under the initiative and chairmanship of Viktor Mykita, Zakarpattia submitted an application for membership status in the Assembly of European Regions. In April 2023, the executive committee of the Assembly of European Regions unanimously decided to grant Zakarpattia full membership status in the Assembly.

2023 – Heading the delegation of the Chamber of Regions of the Congress of Local and Regional Authorities under the President of Ukraine, he presented the current investment passport of Zakarpattia and the investment climate of other regions of Ukraine for the first time at the meeting of the European Union Committee of the Regions in Brussels.
