= Ivan Petrovtsii =

Rusyn poet (1945–2016)

- Іван Петровцій
- Born: 22 May 1945; Osii, Czechoslovakia
- Died: 1 January 2016 (aged 70); Ilnytsia, Ukraine
- Citizenship: Ukrainian
- Education: Uzhhorod State University
- Occupations: Poet, editor, translator

Ivan Yuriyovych Petrovtsii (22 May 1945 – 1 January 2016) was a Rusyn poet, editor and translator. Born in Transcarpathia, he worked as a soldier and laborer before studying the French language at Uzhhorod State University, where he graduated in 1973. After several years as an elementary school teacher, he became a journalist, but also began writing Ukrainian-language poetry. During the collapse of the Soviet Union, he became active in the Rusyn cultural movement and began writing in Rusyn. One of his collections, Nashi spivanky ('Our Songs'), sparked outrage after its publication in 1996 due to its obscene language and condemnation of the newly independent Ukrainian government; the book was condemned by the national press, as well as by president Leonid Kuchma. Petrovtsii continued to publish Rusyn poetry collections over the following years.

== Biography ==
Ivan Yuriyovych Petrovtsii was born on 22 May 1945 in Osii, a village in Transcarpathia, which was ceded from Czechoslovakia to the Ukrainian Soviet Socialist Republic the following month. He attended local school in Osii before finishing tenth grade in Ilnytsia, Khust Raion. After this, he worked various jobs, including as a handyman and laborer. He joined the Soviet Army, and was stationed for three years in Dresden, East Germany. He studied at the Uzhhorod State University, receiving a degree in French language and literature in 1973. He taught elementary school in Osii from 1973 to 1975, before becoming a journalist for various regional newspapers. He began writing poetry in Ukrainian, publishing a series of poetry collections, as well as a detective novel, Manumissio.

=== Rusyn poetry ===
In the final years of the Soviet Union, Petrovtsii became active in the Rusyn national revival movement, speaking at the Rusyn World Congresses and beginning to write poetry in the Rusyn language. His first published Rusyn work was a poetic dictionary and defense of the Rusyn language entitled Dialektariii, abo zh myla knyzhochka rusyn-s´koï bysidŷ u virshakh ('Dialektaria, or a Sweet Little Book of the Rusyn Language in Verse'); this book did not attract much commercial attention, and he republished many of its entries in his later compilations of poetry.

==== Nashi spivanky ====
Petrovtsii published another compilation of his Rusyn poetry in 1996, entitled Nashi spivanky ('Our Songs'). The poems were written in coarse, obscene language, which he described as betiarskii, 'soldiers slang', including a great deal of sexual innuedo and scatological humour; Petrovtsii stated that his use of language was intended as a means to reach the "average mid-level official who swears incessantly for no reason". Many of the poems in the volume took aim at Ukrainian nationalism and the independent Ukrainian government. One poem, Prizident na pivstavky ('Part-Time President'), mocks the Ukrainian government as corrupt and neglectful and calls for the dissolution of the "Ukrainian empire", calling for the independence of Crimea, Subcarpathia, and Galicia.

The release of the book sparked literary scandal. Its obscene language caused such public interest that official print runs were unable to meet public demand, and the book circulated via photocopies. Ukrainian president Leonid Kuchma lambasted the government of Zakarpattia Oblast for failing to curtail the publication of the book, while deputy Viacheslav Chornovil declared the book "anti-Ukrainian, anti-president, anti-parliament, anti-government". The Ukrainian national press condemned Petrovtsii, with support generally limited to other Rusyns.

==== Later works ====
Petrovtsii translated a large volume of foreign-language poetry into Rusyn, publishing some in a compilation entitled Nashi y nynashi spivankŷ ('Our Songs and Others') in 1999. These was included alongside his 2004 poetry book Poslïdnï spüvankŷ ('Last Songs') and his 2003 collection of Rusyn erotic poetry Bytangüs´ki spüvankŷ ('Scoundrel Songs') into a single volume in 2006. His Rusyn verse, styled off the vernacular of his home village of Osii, incorporates elements of traditional folk poetry.

In 1997, Petrovtsii became the founding editor of a Rusyn-language newspaper, Rusyns'ka bysida. He was awarded the Aleksander Dukhnovych Prize for Rusyn Literature in 1998. He died in Ilnytsya on 1 January 2016.
