= Verkhovyna National Nature Park =

National park in Ukraine

- Ukrainian: Верховинський національний природний парк
- IUCN category II (national park)
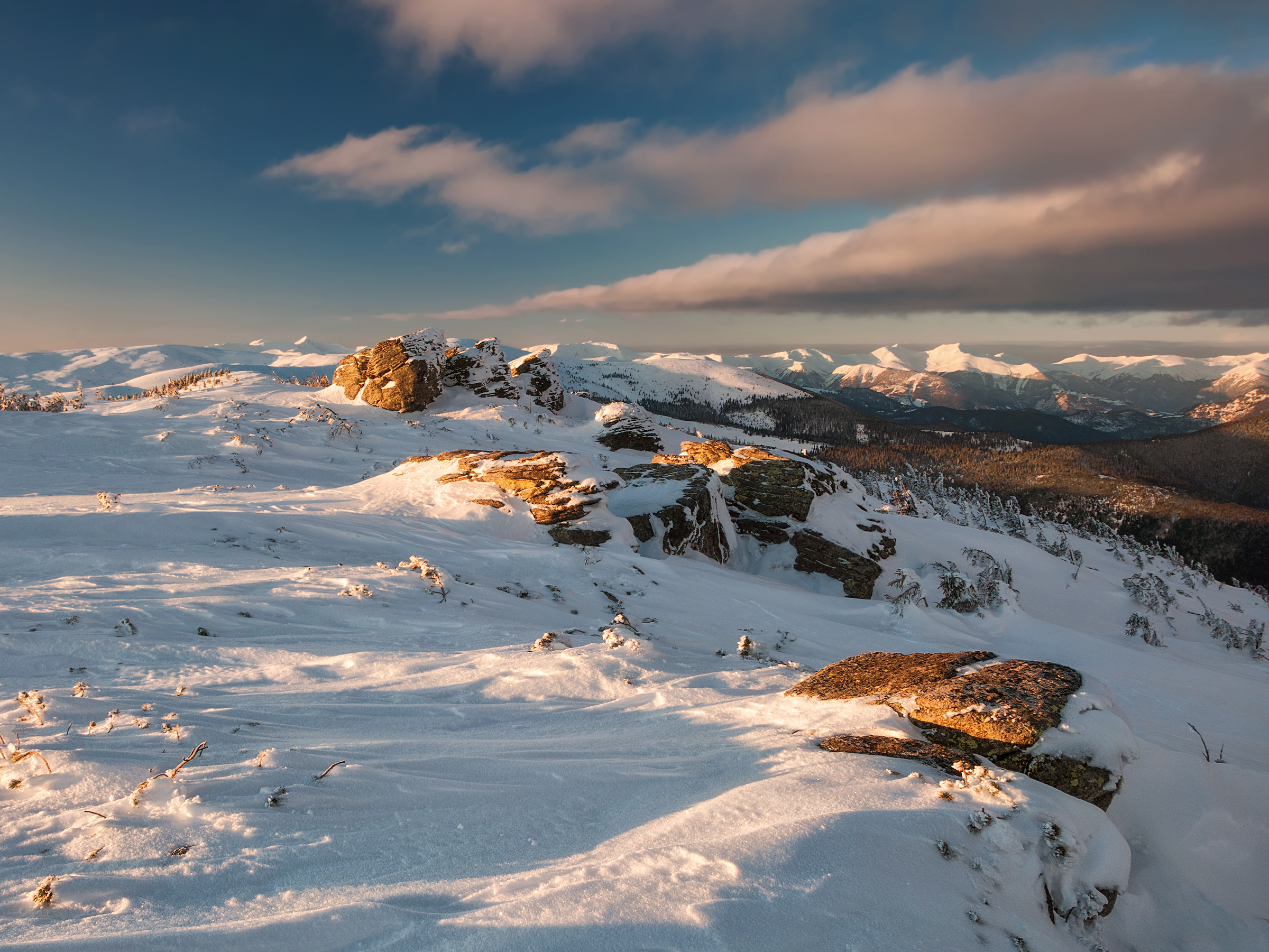
- Verkhovyna National Nature Park

- Location within Ukraine
- Location: Ivano-Frankivsk Oblast, Verkhovyna Raion
- Nearest city: Chernivtsi
- Coordinates: 48.16138889°N 24.94527778°E
- Area: 12,023 hectares (29,709 acres; 120 km^{2}; 46 sq mi)
- Established: 2010
- Governing body: Ministry of Ecology and Natural Resources (Ukraine)
- Website: https://verkhovynskyi-park.in.ua/

The Verkhovyna National Nature Park (Ukrainian: Верховинський національний природний парк) is a national park of Ukraine that covers the highest reaches of the Cheremosh River, in the Carpathian Mountains. The park is in the administrative district of Verkhovyna in Ivano-Frankivsk Oblast; the nearest city is Chernivtsi.

== Topography ==
Located in one of the most mountainous, inaccessible parts of the Ukrainian Carpathians, the park is situated in the Chivchino-Grinyava mountain range, at the headwaters of the two main tributaries of the Cheremosh River, which flows north into the Prut River, which in turns flows east and south to the Danube River. Geologically, the park is on the northwest portion of the Marmaros crystalline massif (limestone). The Cheremosh National Nature Park is to the east.

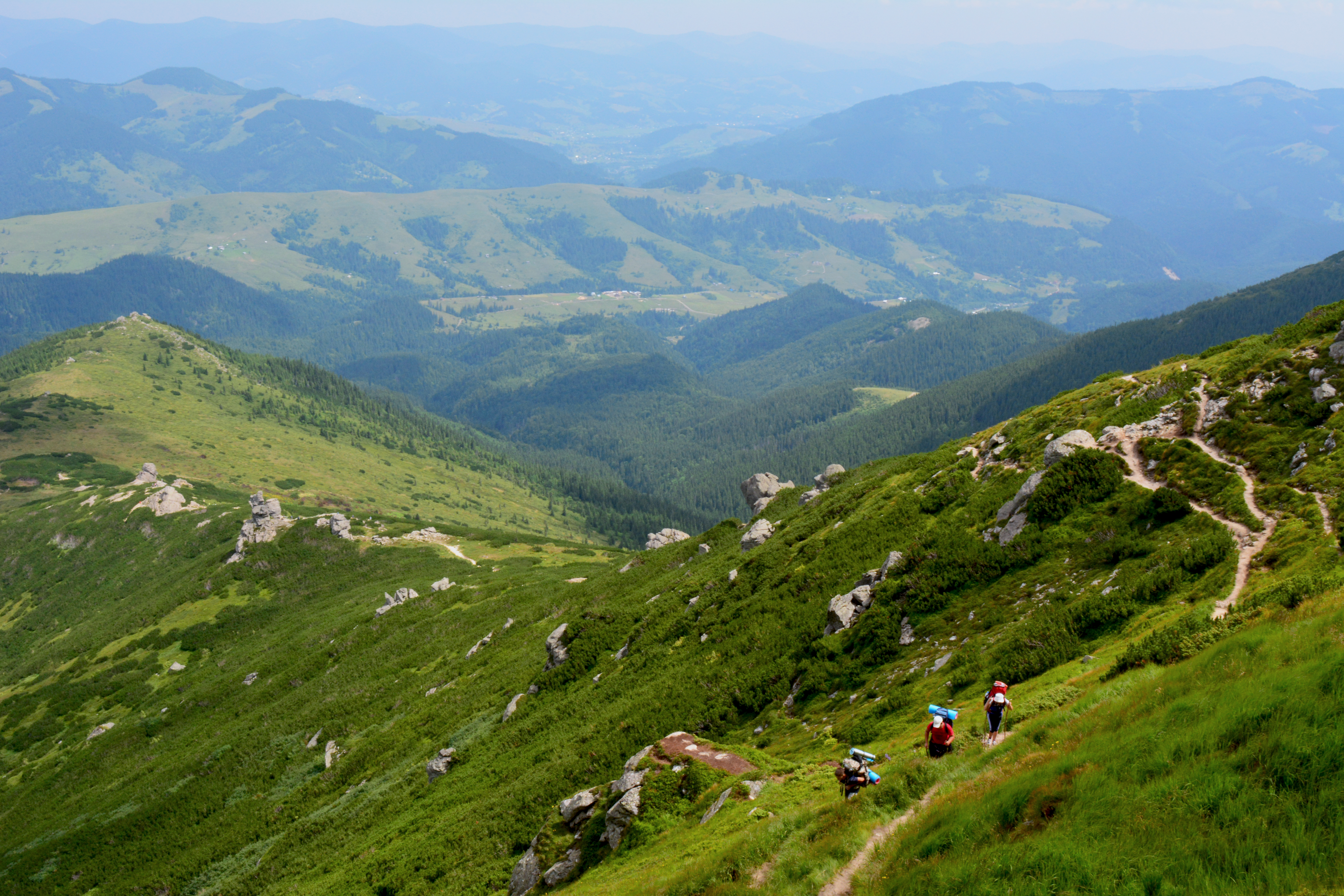
Hiking trails in the park

== Climate and ecoregion ==
The climate of Verkhovyna is Humid continental climate, warm summer (Köppen climate classification (Dfb)). This climate is characterized by large seasonal temperature differentials and a warm summer (at least four months averaging over 10 °C (50 °F), but no month averaging over 22 °C (72 °F). Average precipitation is 1,002 millimetres (39.4 in) per year; winds are predominantly to the northeast.

== Flora and fauna ==
The park has forest, meadow and swamp floristic communities. Forest types are affected by altitude zoning. Above 1,600 meters is mostly mountain pine and green alder. From 1,200 meters to 1,600 meters, the forest is predominantly spruce. Below 1,200 meters the forests are mixed.

== Public use ==
As a relatively new park, and one which emphasizes nature protection, recreational facilities are still under development. There are hiking paths and the staff provides educational programs for local schoolchildren.

== See also ==
- National Parks of Ukraine
