= Intercession Church, Ilnytsia =

Church building in Ilnitsya, Ukraine

Intercession Church
- Свято-Покровська церква

Religion
- Affiliation: Eastern Orthodox
- Rite: Mukachevo Orthodox Eparchy of the Ukrainian Orthodox Church (Moscow Patriarchate)
- Ecclesiastical or organisational status: Church
- Status: Active

Location
- Location: Ilnytsia, Khust Raion, Zakarpattia Oblast, Ukraine
- State: Ukraine
- Interactive map of Intercession Church
- Coordinates: 48°20′36″N 23°4′47″E

Architecture
- Type: Church
- Groundbreaking: 1992
- Completed: 2000
- Direction of façade: West

The Intercession Church (Ukrainian: Свято-Покровська церква) is an Orthodox church in the central part of the village of Ilnytsia, Khust Raion, Zakarpattia Oblast, Ukraine.

== History ==
In 1907 at the secret meeting of the Orthodox movement in Ilnytsia, it was decided to send Oleksandr Kabalyuk (later canonized as Saint Reverend Aleksiy Karpatorusky) to Mount Athos to get the Orthodox objects of worship.

In 1923 the majority of the population of Ilnytsia made a decision to revert to the canonical Orthodox Church and leave the Greek Orthodox Church, which had been propagated in all villages of the region for almost three centuries. Having escaped the Greek Orthodox Church, the Orthodox people automatically lost the church, all other church buildings, and property. During the first years of their Orthodox life, the Orthodox Christians of Ilnytsia did not have their own church. The divine liturgies were conducted in a large room of the house, which belonged to Pavlo Vasylovych Savko- the fighter for the Orthodox religion, who was prosecuted for being Orthodox.

In 1925 a kind of a temporary barrack was built of wood near the railway station on the plot of land owned by Vasyl Hrytsanko and his wife Anna to hold divine service there. On this spot in 1926–1928, a wood church devoted to the Intercession of the Theotokos was erected. The construction was maintained by the donations of local inhabitants. The Czechoslovak authorities allocated 2 thousand Czech korunas to finish the erection. In 1937 with the help of the Mukachevo eparchy the grant-in-aid (1 thousand CZK) was given to introduce the iconostasis. In October 1958 the porch was added and in two years sexton's room was finished as well. There were approximately 1,830 Orthodox believers at that time.

In 1992 the construction of a new, bigger church commenced. The architecture of the future church was designed by the enterprise MIP "Ekostroy" based in Saint Petersburg. The erection was planned in such a way as to preserve the old church and pray therein as long as possible, thus the divine service was never canceled during the construction process. Every Sunday God's words were heard from the ambon of the church. Due to reasons the architectural plan was not fully followed. The upper part of the temple was remodeled by the local architects. In 2000 the erection of the church was completed.
