= Viktor Pasulko =

Ukrainian footballer (born 1961)

Personal information
- Full name: Viktor Vasyl'ovych Pasulko
- Date of birth: 1 January 1961 (age 65)
- Place of birth: Ilnytsia, Zakarpattia Oblast, Ukrainian SSR, Soviet Union
- Height: 1.77 m (5 ft 10 in)
- Position: Midfielder

Senior career*
| Years | Team | Apps | (Gls) |
| 1978–1979 | Hoverla Uzhhorod | | (1) |
| 1980 | Spartak Ivano-Frankivsk | | |
| 1980 | LVVPU | | |
| 1981 | SKA Lviv | | |
| 1981 | Hoverla Uzhhorod | 31 | (2) |
| 1982 | Bukovyna Chernivtsi | 17 | (1) |
| 1982–1986 | Chornomorets Odesa | 105 | (20) |
| 1987–1989 | Spartak Moscow | 75 | (16) |
| 1990–1993 | Fortuna Köln | 105 | (14) |
| 1993–1996 | Eintracht Braunschweig | 94 | (17) |
| 1996–1997 | ASV Durlach | | |
| 1997–1998 | Bonner SC | | |
| 1999–2000 | FC Junkersdorf | | |

International career
| 1988 | Soviet Union | 8 | (1) |

Managerial career
- 2002–2005: Moldova
- 2005–2006: Khazar Lankaran
- 2008–2009: Sho'rtanneftgaz G'uzor
- 2010: Atyrau
- 2011–2013: Ordabasy
- 2014: Orlandina
- 2015–2016: Rodange 91
- 2017: Okzhetpes
- * Club domestic league appearances and goals

Viktor Vasylovych Pasulko (Ukrainian: Віктор Васильович Пасулько; born 1 January 1961) is a Ukrainian football manager and former player.

== Club career ==
Pasulko was born in Ilnitsa, Ukrainian SSR. He played most of his career as a midfielder in various teams in the former USSR. The last ten years of his career he spent in Germany playing for lower division teams.

== International career ==
Pasulko made his debut for Soviet Union on 20 February 1988 in a friendly against Italy. He played at the UEFA Euro 1988, including the final game against Netherlands and scoring a goal in a group match against England.

== Managerial career ==
Pasulko was plucked from amateur football to succeed Alexandru Spiridon as Moldova national team manager in January 2002.

In July 2014 he was surprisingly named new head coach of Italian Serie D amateurs Orlandina. His experience in Sicily was however short-lived as he was sacked on 22 September 2014 after just collecting three draws in the first three league games.

Pasulko left Luxembourgish club Rodange 91 in April 2016 after it became apparent that the club would be unable to fulfil his contract.

== Honours ==
- Soviet Top League winner: 1987, 1989
- UEFA Euro 1988 runner-up
