= Zacharovanyi Krai National Nature Park =

National park in Ukraine

National Nature Park 'Zacharovanyi Krai'
- Національний парк «Зачарований край»
- IUCN category II (national park)
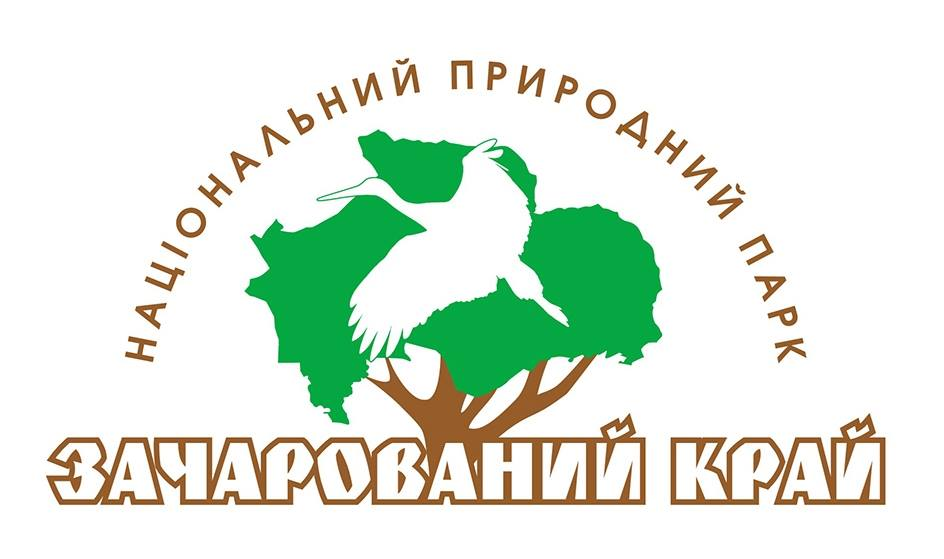

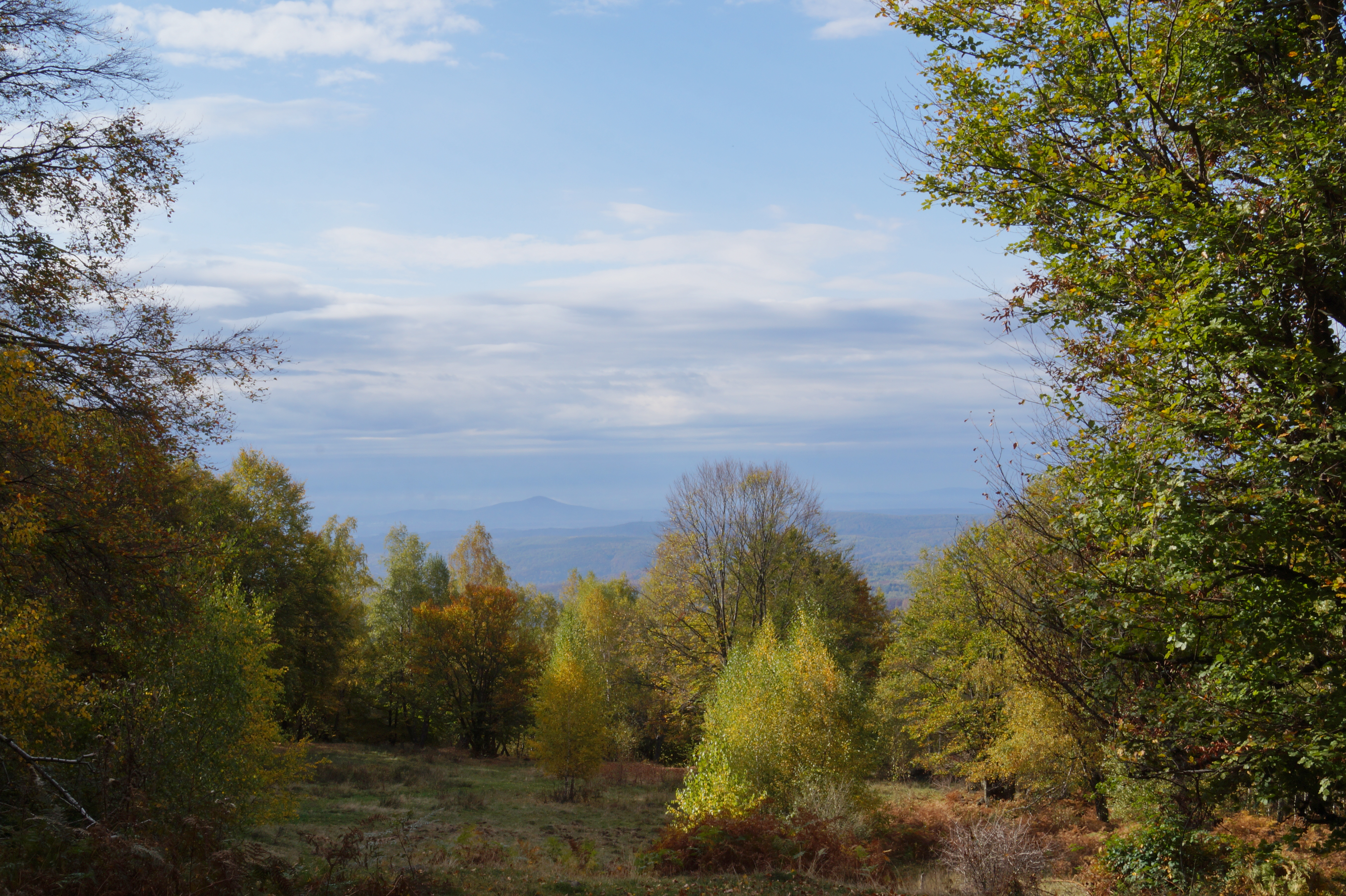
- View in Zacharovanyi Krai NNP

- Location within Ukraine
- Interactive map of National Nature Park 'Zacharovanyi Krai'
- Location: Zakarpattia Oblast, Ukraine
- Nearest city: Irshava
- Coordinates: 48°21′10″N 23°4′25″E
- Area: 6,101 ha (61.01 km^{2})
- Established: 2009
- Website: http://nppzk.info/golovna.html

Zacharovanyi Krai National Nature Park (Ukrainian: Національний природний парк «Зачарований край», romanized: Natsionalnyi pryrodnyi park "Zacharovanyi krai", lit. 'Enchanted Land') is one of the national parks, located in Zakarpattia Oblast in the country's southwest. It was established in 2009 and covers an area of 6,101 ha (61.01 km^{2}). The park has its headquarters in the town of Irshava, Khust Raion.

The national park contains a varied flora and fauna, including Carpathian red deer, chamois, brown bear, wild boar, European badger, Eurasian lynx, European wildcat, Eurasian beaver, trout and grayling. The park was created to preserve, reproduce and efficient use of the typical and unique natural complexes of Eastern Carpathians.

Zacharovana Dolyna State Park and Chorne Bahno Swamps are parts of the Zacharovanyi Krai.
