= Cheremosh National Nature Park =

National park in Ukraine

- Ukrainian: Черемоський національний природний парк
- IUCN category II (national park)
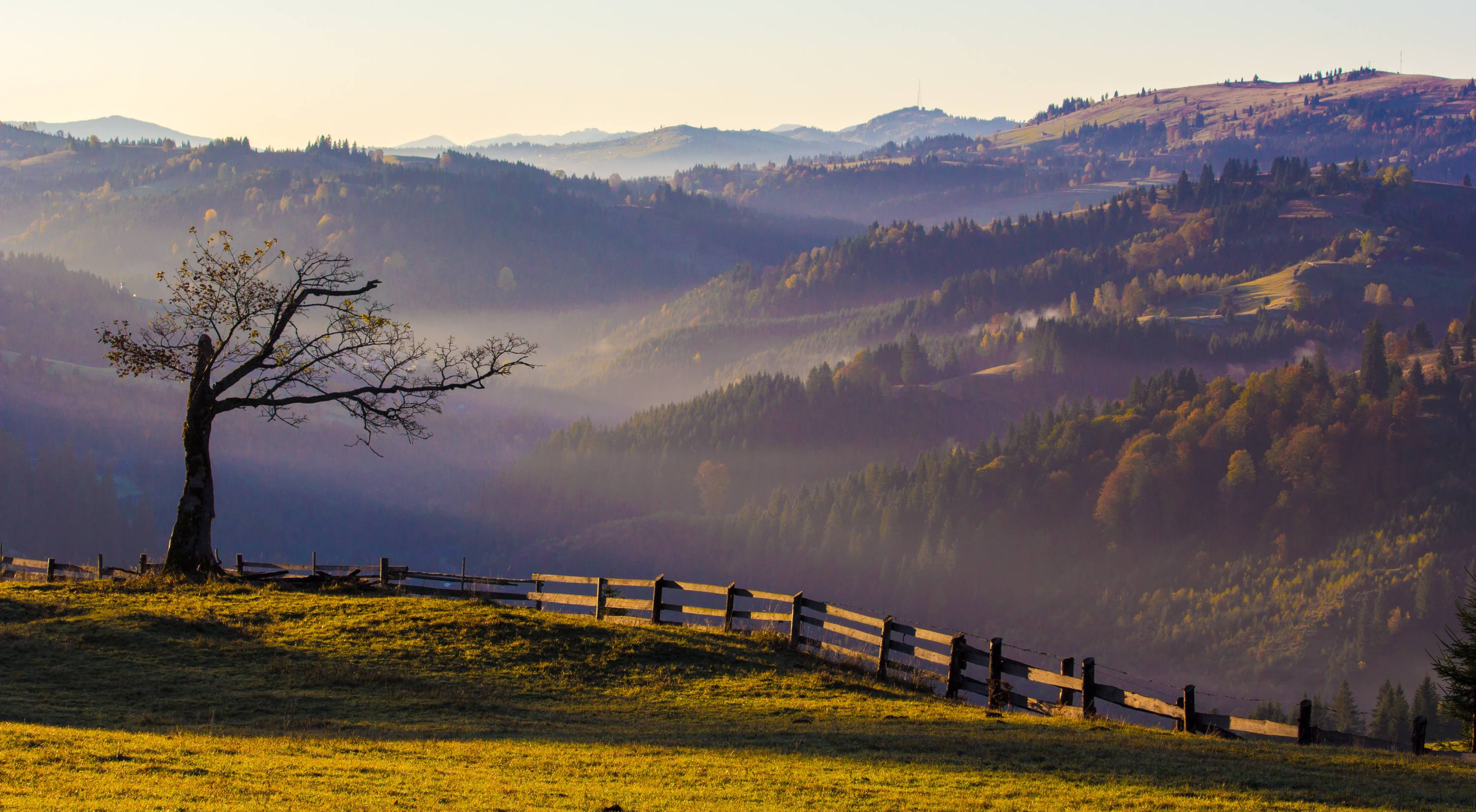
- Mountain forests, fields, and meadows, Cheremosh Mountain National Park

- Location within Ukraine
- Location: Chernivtsi Oblast, Ukraine
- Nearest city: Putyla
- Coordinates: 47°59′43″N 25°05′45″E
- Area: 7,117.5 hectares (17,588 acres; 71 km^{2}; 27 sq mi)
- Established: 2009
- Governing body: Ministry of Ecology and Natural Resources (Ukraine)
- Website: https://cheremoskyi.org.ua/

The Cheremosh National Nature Park (Ukrainian: Черемоський національний природний парк, romanized: Cheremoskyi National Nature Park), was created by Ukraine in 2009 from a collection of three existing nature reserves in the northeastern section of the Carpathian Mountains, located in southwestern Ukraine. The national park highlights the highly varied geology of the northeastern Carpathians, as well as the deep spruce forests of the region. The park is located in Vyzhnytsia Raion of Chernivtsi Oblast.

== Topography ==
The park stands in the historical region of Bukovina, a roughly 60 km diameter sector of the Eastern Carpathians that straddled the border of present-day Ukraine and Romania. Cheremosh National Nature Park was originally assembled in 2009 from three existing nature reserves:

- Black Dil Nature Reserve, which was originally established in 1972 as a geological reserve, with a close placement of different types of metamorphic shale, grano-diorites, Triassic-Jurassic carbonates, and sedimentary rock.
- State Enterprise Putil Forest, covering the upper reaches of the White Cheremosh River, and protecting important geological sites and landforms,
- Marmaros Crystalline Massif, a limestone mountain with caves and a mine.

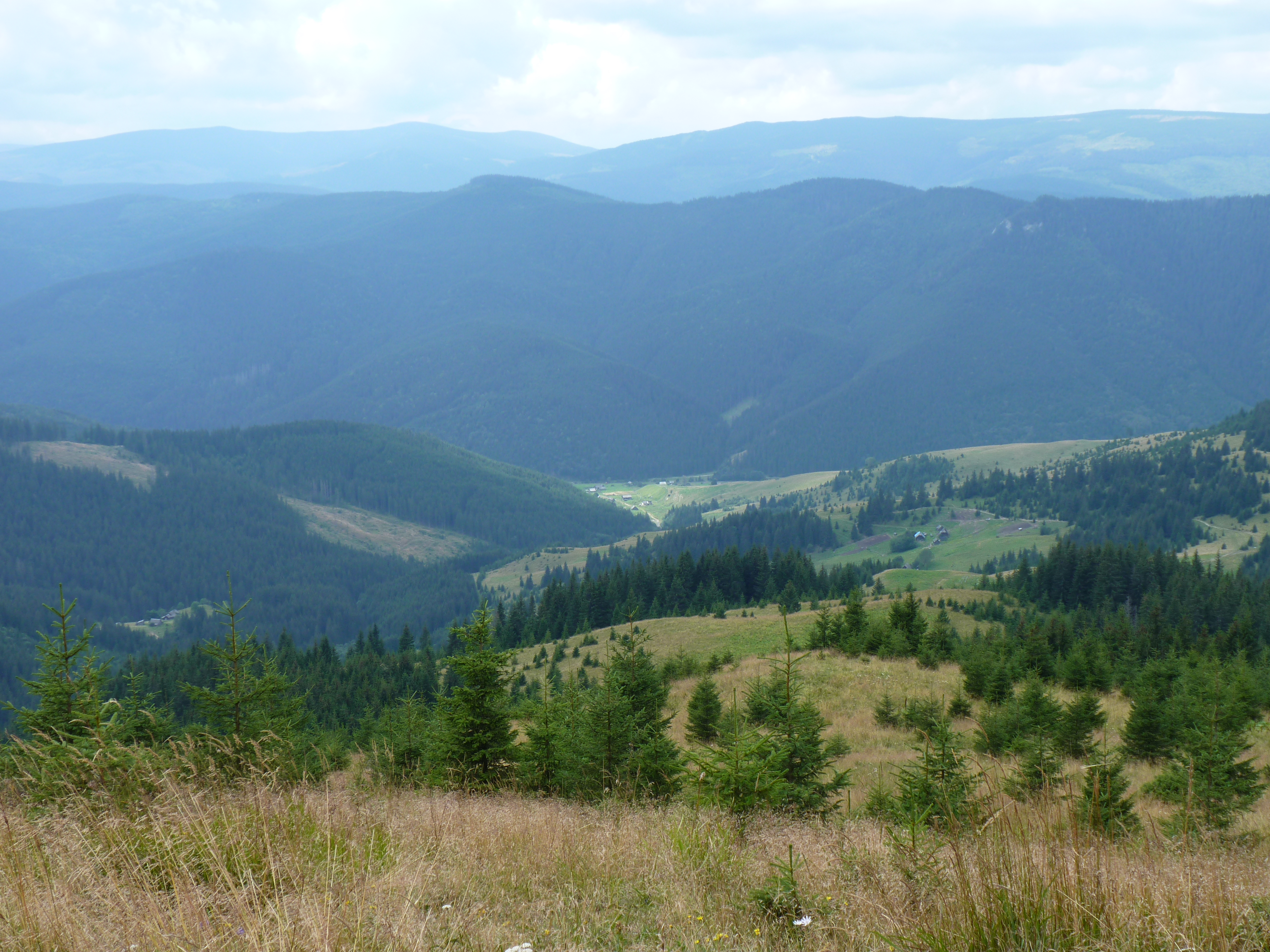
Black Dil Spit, Cheremosh Mountain National Park

The elements of the park occupy elevations from 947 meters to 1574 meters

== Climate and ecoregion ==
The Cheremosh area has a Humid continental climate - warm summer sub-type (Köppen climate classification Dfb), with large seasonal temperature differentials and a warm summer (at least four or more months averaging over 10 °C (50 °F), but no month averaging over 22 °C (72 °F)). Precipitation in the general region averages 850 mm/yr, of which about 300 mm/yr falls in the park as snow. The average temperature in January is −9.1 °C (15.6 °F), and the average temperature in August is 21.5 °C (70.7 °F). Because the park is at higher elevations, its climate is cooler than the surrounding lowlands.

The park is in the Carpathian montane conifer forests ecoregion. This region covers the Carpathians across their entire length, from Poland to the south of Romania, with the Cheremosh National Nature Park approximately in the center.

== Flora and fauna ==
The dominant vegetation is spruce forest, which covers 80% of the park. Interspersed are mountain meadows, lakes and rivers, with the occasional stand of old-growth forest containing fir, pine and deciduous trees at lower altitudes. The park is especially known for it wide variety of mountain wildflowers. On the territory of the Cheremosky Park, 44 species of rare plants, more than 120 species of vertebrates and 5,000 invertebrates will be under state protection.

== Public use ==
The park features hiking trails and mountain biking trails. Park rangers provide ecological education and tours to local school children and to interested visitors.

== See also ==
- National Parks of Ukraine
