= Syniohora National Nature Park =

National park and former presidential residence in Ukraine

Coordinates: 48°37′15″N 24°13′15″E

- Національний природний парк «Синьогора»
- IUCN category II (national park)
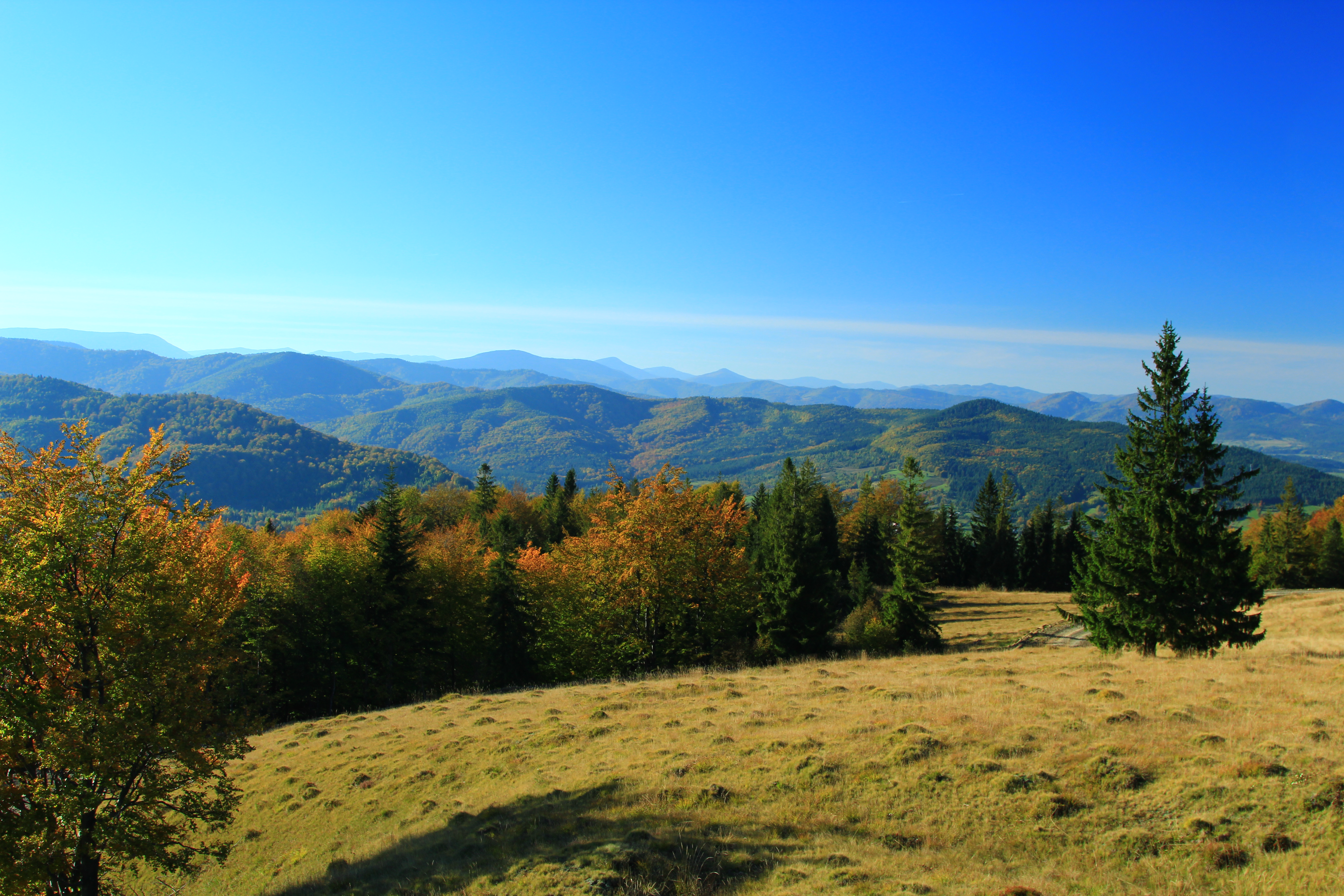
- Interactive map of Syniohora National Nature Park
- Location: Ivano-Frankivsk Oblast, Ukraine
- Nearest city: Huta
- Area: 10,866 ha (108.66 km^{2})
- Established: 2009
- Governing body: State Management of Affairs

The Syniohora National Nature Park (Ukrainian: Національний природний парк «Синьогора», romanized: Natsionalnyi pryrodnyi park «Synohora», lit. ''Blue Mountain'') is a national park of Ukraine that was created in 2009 out of the Presidential official residence located near the Huta rural hromada, Ivano-Frankivsk Raion (formerly in Bohorodchany Raion). The residence also known as the winter residence is administered by the State Management of Affairs and funded by the state budget.

== Public use ==
Built in 2001, as a sanatorium of the "Ivano-Frankivskghaz", the residence was transferred to state ownership in December 2002 by the Yanukovych government and turned into a national park in 2009.

It was agreed in accordance with the established procedure to include 10866 hectares of state-owned land in the territory of the Syniohora National Nature Park, which are withdrawn from the state organization Residence Syniohora and provided to the national nature park for permanent use.
