= Vyzhnytsia National Nature Park =

National park in Ukraine

Coordinates: 48°09′25″N 25°18′20″E

- IUCN category II (national park)
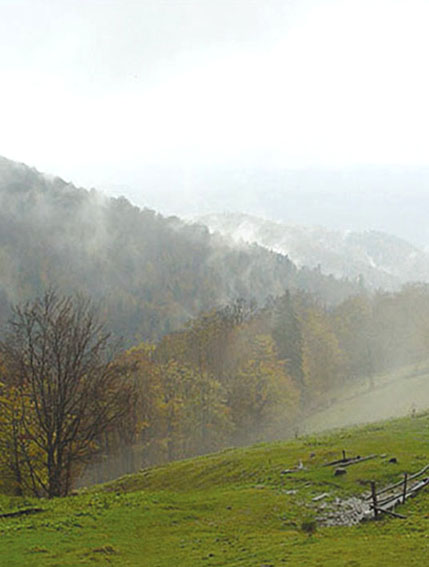

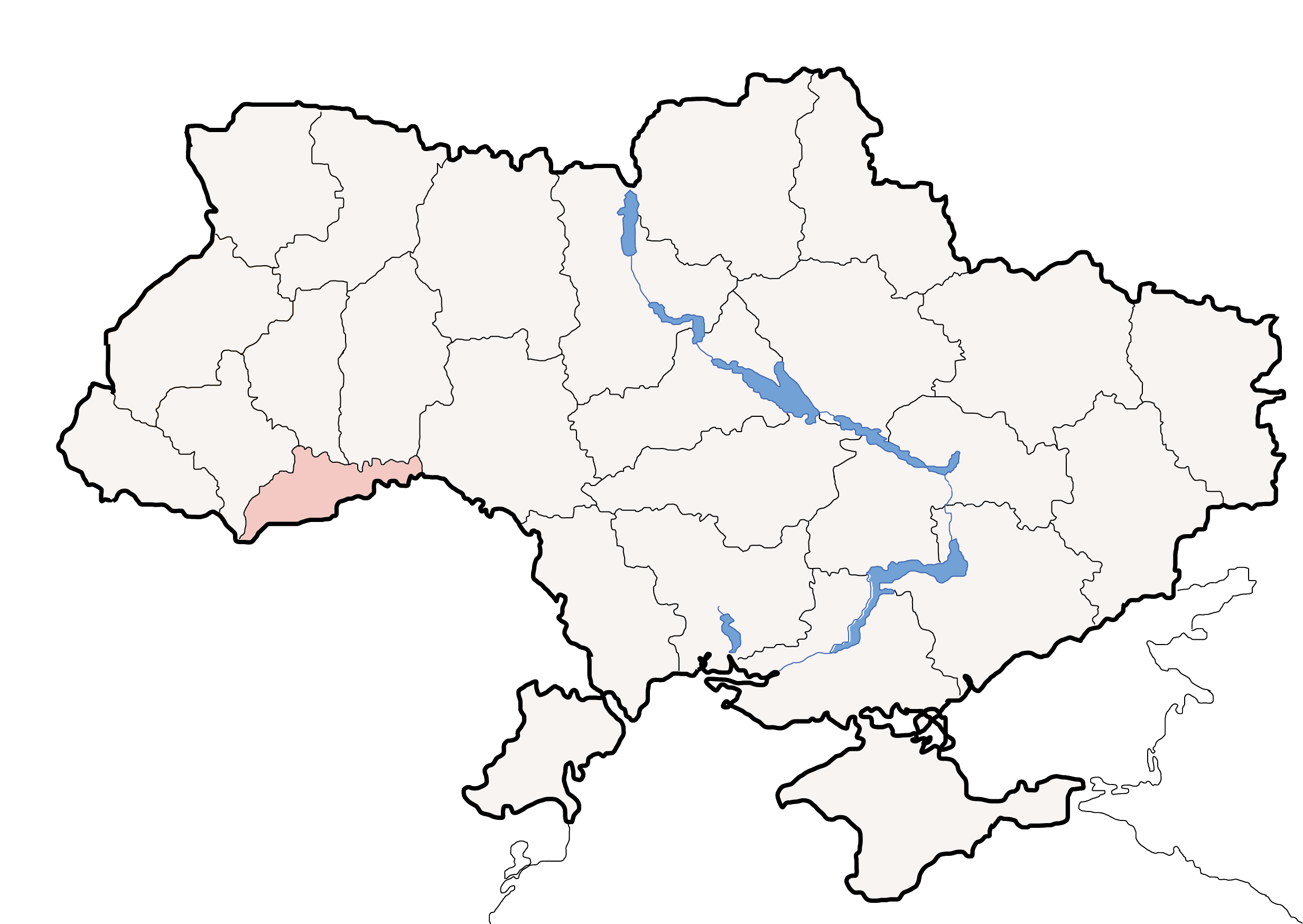
- Location of Chernivtsi Oblast in Ukraine
- Location: Vyzhnytsia Raion, western portion of Chernivtsi Oblast, Ukraine
- Area: 112.38 km^{2} (43.39 sq mi)
- Established: August 30, 1995
- Named for: Named after the region, where NNP is located
- Governing body: Ministry of Natural Environment Protection of Ukraine
- Website: http://www.npp.cv.ua/

The Vyzhnytsia National Nature Park (Ukrainian: Національний природний парк «Вижницький», romanized: Vyžnyc'kyj) is a protected area in south-western Ukraine which administration is located in the town Berehomet. The national park has 87 employees with 6 of them working in the scientific section and 29 in the security service. The park was created for the conservation, restoration and sustainable use of natural landscapes of Bukovinian Carpathian with its unique historical and cultural complexes.

== Nature conditions ==
It is one of the smallest National Parks in the Ukrainian Carpathians. Vyzhnytsia park represents a lowland part of the Carpathians with a fairly mild climate. Thermophilic species – beech and fir dominate in the woods. The park is situated on the edge of the Outer Carpathians and the Precarpathian region. In the area of lowland Pokuttya-Bukovinian Carpathian terrain the mountain ranges are low, have smoothed peak crests, and only Smydovatyi ridge in the southern part of the park can be attributed to middle elevations of 1000 m or more above sea level. Overall the relief of the national park characterizes with soft contours, due to low resistance against denudation of flysch sediments, that compose it. Sharp terrain forms and slopes over 45 - 50° occur only in the western part of Cheremosh river in places of sandstones and erosional downcutting of riverbeds. Sometimes there are landslides and small sized screes. The landscape diversity of the park is determined by the affiliation to the basins of Cheremosh river and Siret river. Eastern part, where the Siret flows has more smoothed contours of mountain ridges, broad valleys of tributaries, fewer geological delaminations. The western part, where Cheremosh River flows is much more intensively dissected. It is the reason why steep slopes with outcrops of geological rocks, scenic cliffs, numerous waterfalls, gorges-gate are common here.

The climate in the National Park is temperate continental, with ample and abundant moisture, not hot summers, mild winters and warm autumns. There are significant microclimatic differences between the two parts of the park, Siretska and Cheremoshska (generally, Cheremoska part is noticeably warmer) and within these areas - between the slopes of the southern and northern exposures. Usually in winter on the northern slopes is held a steady thick snow cover, while on its southern part there is no snow.

The soil cover varies greatly because of its geomorphological and climatic differences within its territory

== Biota ==
=== Flora ===
A variety of vegetation and flora of the national park is caused by its location on the border of two geobotanical districts: Sheshorsko-Krasnoyilske with its mountain spruce-fir-beech and beech-spruce-fir forests and Bolehivsko-Berehomet with the piedmont fir-beech forests. Through the park boundary of two floristic regions Chyvchyno-Hryniava and Carpathian passes.

Rich forests are the main wealth of the park. Forests occupy more than 95% of its territory. The largest area of the park is occupied by fir-beech forests, rarely pure beech forests. Overall, beech and fir forests occupy 60% of wooded park area. At some parts of the park forests exist where trees of beech and fir reach a height of 40 m and 70–90 cm in diameter. Grasslands (meadows) take a relatively small area on the slopes and crests of ridges.

Total number of vascular plants at the national park equals 960 species (including 40 species listed in the Red Book of Ukraine). There are 236 species of bryophytes. Among the endangered and rare species here is a significant group of orchids species, listed in the Red Book of Ukraine. Nadborodnyk bezlystyi has the greatest value because it is one of the rarest orchid in Ukraine. Today only two places in Carpathians are known where rare orchids grow, and both of them are in the Vyzhnytsia NNP.

=== Fauna ===
Most vertebrates of the park are the typical representatives of the broadleaf and mixed forests in Europe (white stork, lesser spotted eagle, edible, forest and hazel dormice, wildcat). The proportion of species of Mediterranean origin is insignificant, common representatives are: fire salamander, European tree frog, Aesculapian snake, etc. There is also a small amount of typical mountain species (yellow-bellied toad, rock pipit, grey wagtail, etc.) and boreal species (western capercaillie, boreal owl, Ural owl, lynx, brown bear, etc.).

Overall, the vertebrate fauna of the national park is represented of one species of cyclostomata, 20 species of fishes, 12 species of amphibians, 7 species of reptiles, 141 species of birds, 52 species of mammals. Of these 62 species listed in the Red Book of Ukraine, and 11 species - the European Red List.

== Cultural and historical significance ==
National Nature Park "Vyzhnytsia" is located within the original and attractive historical and ethnographic region - Bukovina, extremely rich in historical and cultural attractions. Within the limits of a park, most of them are concentrated in a town of Vyzhnytsia. This town was first mentioned in Moldova chronicles in 1501, it was famous for its old fairground tradition. The names of prominent figures of Ukrainian culture: Yuriy Fedkovych, Lesya Ukrayinka, Ivan Franko Marko Vovchok, Olga Kobylianska Mykhaylo Kotsyubinskyi and others are closely connected with Vyzhnytsia.

Among the many cultural, historical and architectural monuments of national park stand Dmytrivska and Mykolayivska Church, Roman Catholic Church, a former synagogue - one of Hasidic shrines in Ukraine, home of Vyzhnytsia College of Applied Arts (formerly carving school) in Vyzhnytsia, Mykolayivska and Mykhaylivska churches, Yuryivska church and belfry in the town of Berehomet, Mykolayivska and Ivanivska churches with belfries in the village of Vyzhenka.

== Recreational value ==
The area where the NNP is located has long been traditionally the center of North Bukovinian tourism. It had popular tourist routes. Today the active hiking trail routes have been restored, together with newly laid environmental educational trails, starting green tourism and fully working environmental and educational center in Berehomet and Nature Museum in the village of Zeleniv. Among tourists the most popular routes are "Stone Ring Park", "On Thick strands", "God knows".

The territories neighbouring to the National Nature Park and some of itself are rich in mineral water. The tradition of using them reaches deep into millenniums. Water from a unique source "Lawns" (there are only three of such a kind in Europe) treated diseases of the digestive system and hemophilia. This water has more than 20 therapeutically active ions of various trace elements. In recent years two more source of medical waters have been discovered and their industrial development has already begun.

Recreational resources of the park are rated 83 point out of 100. (in Ukrainian)
