= Irshava =

City in Zakarpattia Oblast, Ukraine

Irshava Іршава
- City
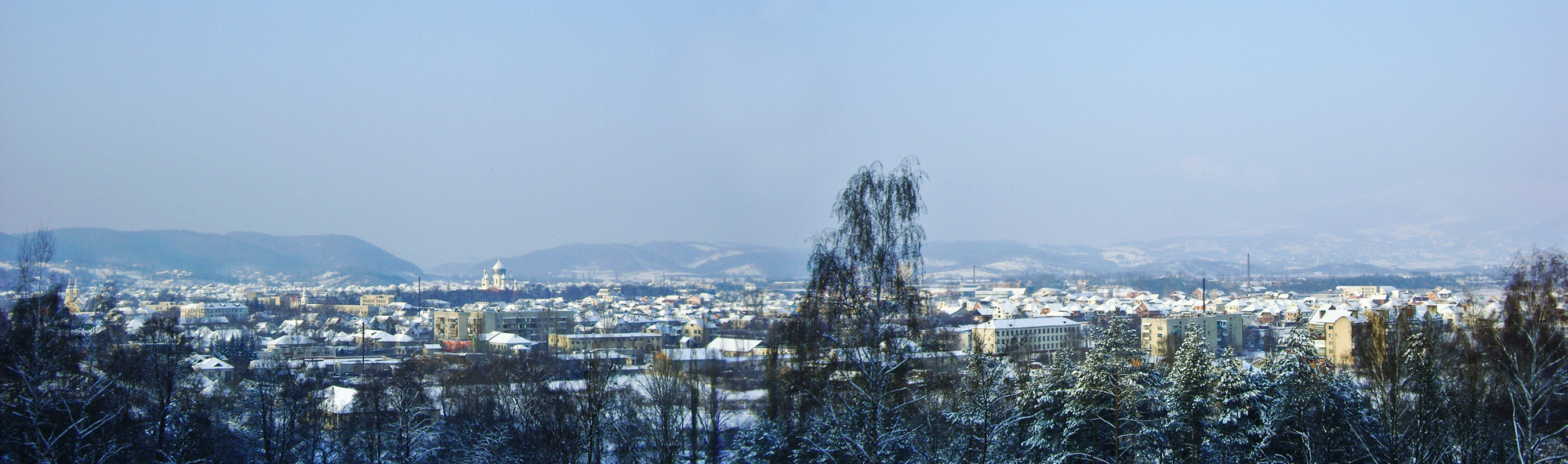
- Irshava skyline

- Flag Coat of arms

- Location of Irshava Irshava (Ukraine)
- Coordinates: 48°18′00″N 23°03′00″E
- Country: Ukraine
- Oblast: Zakarpattia Oblast
- Raion: Khust Raion
- Hromada: Irshava urban hromada
- Founded: 1341
- Incorporated: 1982

Government
  - Mayor: Stepan Bobyk
- Elevation: 134 m (440 ft)

Population (2022)
  - Total: 9,163
- Time zone: UTC+1 (CET)
  - Summer (DST): UTC+2 (CEST)
- Postal code: 90100
- Area code: +380-3144
- Climate: Cfb
- Website: http://irshava.com.ua/

Irshava (Ukrainian: Іршава, IPA: [irˈʃɑwɐ]) is a city located in Zakarpattia Oblast (province) in western Ukraine. It was the administrative center of Irshava Raion (district) until it was abolished in 2020 and was merged with Khust Raion. Today, the population is 9,163 (2022 estimate).

== Names ==
There are several alternative names used for this city: Rusyn: Иршава, Russian: Иршава, Hungarian: Ilosva, German: Irschawa, Slovak: Iršava, Romanian: Iloșva, Polish: Irszawa, and Yiddish: Orsheve.

== Geography ==
Irshava is located above the eponymous river at the foothills of Volcanic Carpathians.

== History ==
The Hasidic Rabbi Joel Teitelbaum (later of Satmar) lived in Irshava twice, between 1911 and 1914, and again between 1922 and 1925. He established a yeshiva there.

A local newspaper is published here since October 1946.

In 1956 the city had 3,600 inhabitants.

City since September 1982. In January 1989 the population was 9873 people.

== Demographics ==
In 2001, population was 10,515. It included:

- Ukrainians (98.6%)
- Russians (0.7%)
- Slovaks (0.3%)
- Hungarians (0.3%)

Native language in 2001:

- Ukrainian (97.9%)
- Russian (1.4%)
- Hungarian (0.4%)

== Economy ==
Irshava houses a textile factory, a wood procession plant, a sawmill and enterprises of food industry. Deposits of brown coal, marl and limestone are located in nearby areas.

== Notable people ==
- Ivanna Bagová (born 1993) – Slovak singer, winner of The Voice of Czecho-Slovakia
- Rabbi Gruenberger Yaacov – active in Prague's Jewish Town Alt-neu Schul synagogue; Studied in yeshiva in Trnava, Slovakia

== Gallery ==
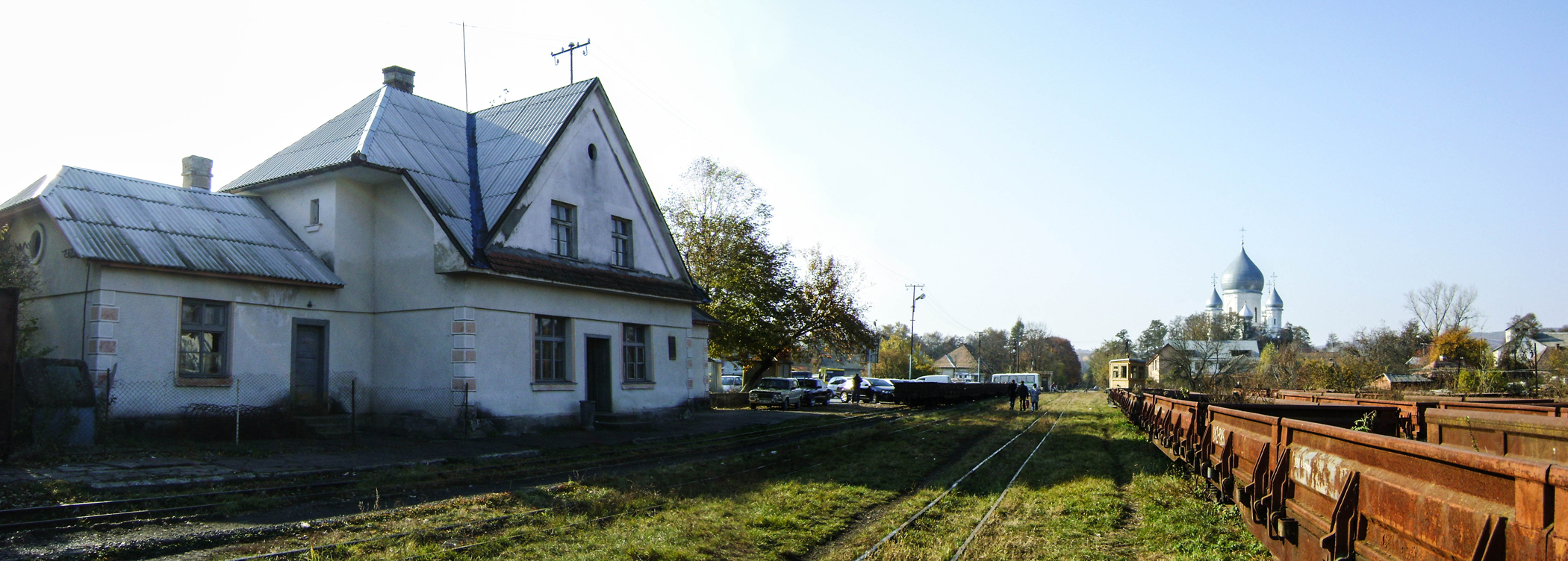
Irshava railway station

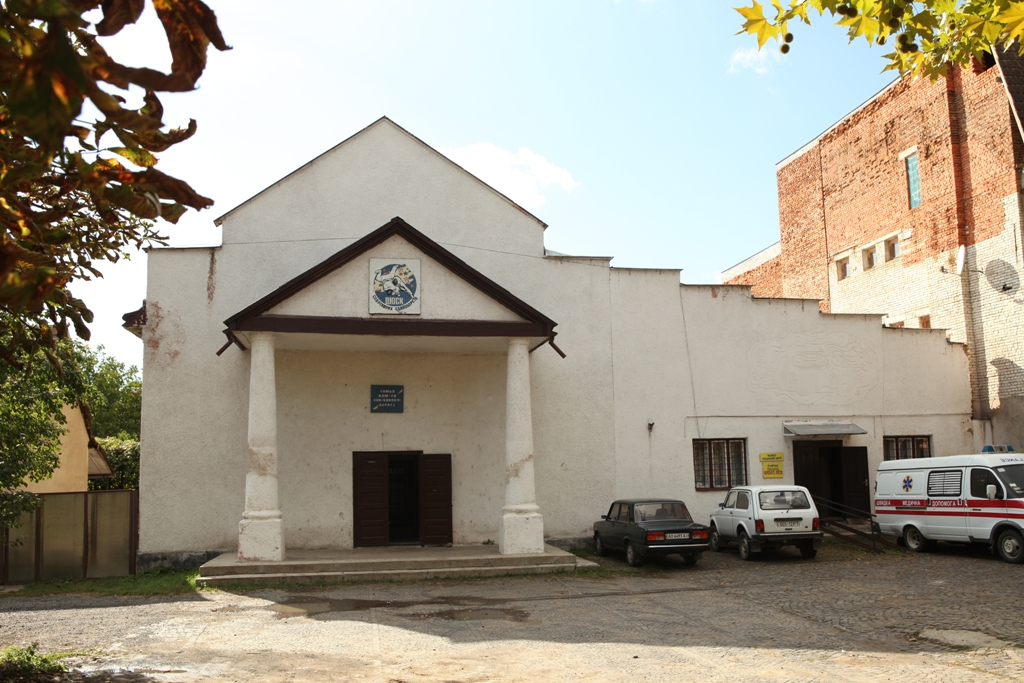
Former Great Synagogue, later the club

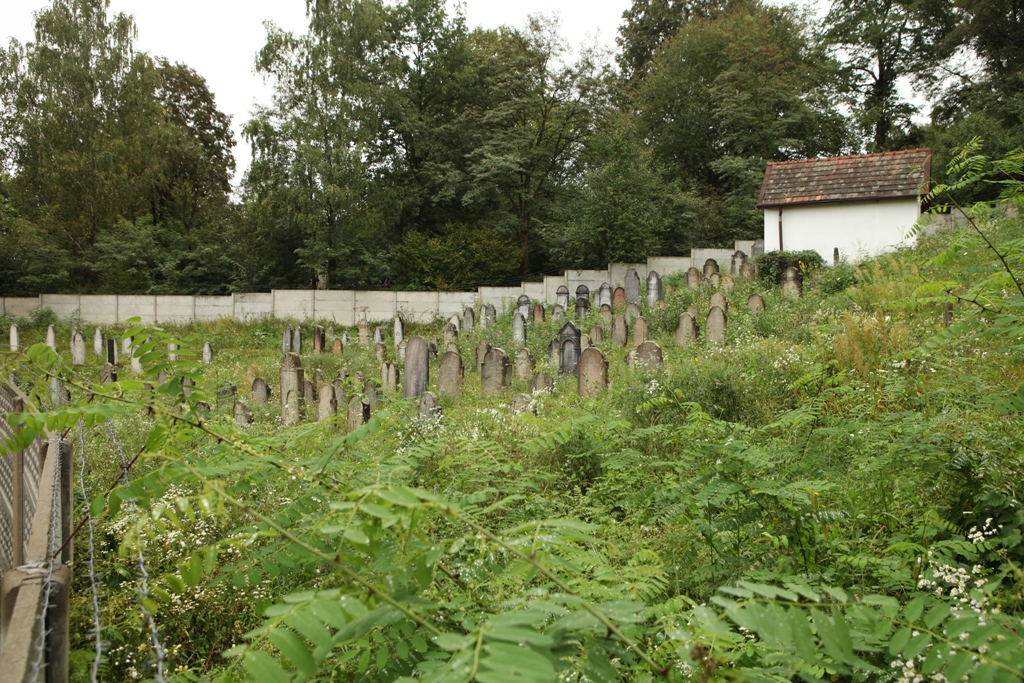
Jewish cemetery

== See also ==
- Zakarpattia Oblast
