= Zacharovana Dolyna State Park =

Coordinates: 48°21′22.9″N 23°6′16.46″E

Zacharovana Dolyna (Ukrainian: Заказник «Зачарована долина», lit. ''Enchanted Valley'') is a zakaznyk (state park) located in Khust Raion, Zakarpattia Oblast, Ukraine.

== Wildlife sanctuary ==
Located in Zakarpattia, covering an area of 150 hectares (370 acres) within the Zacharovanyi Krai National Nature Park. Zacharovana Dolyna was designed in 1978 to protect picturesque stony crests in the Smerekovyi potik upstream. Rocks from 20 to 100 metres (66 to 328 ft) high naturally formed by secondary quartzite have been impacted by weathering processes and transformed eventually to mystically shaped massive sculptures. On the right bank of the river is a cave.

=== Vegetation ===
The vegetation of the park is formed mainly by beech forests mixed with spruce trees.

The adjacent villages are Pidhirne and Ilnytsia.

Due to the development of a new Protected Area called Zacharovanyi Krai National Nature Park covering Zacharovana Dolyna, the latter protective area remains protected (zakaznyk) as part of the National Nature Park. As soon as the management plan (Park Design documents) are ready and approved, status of zakaznyk can be canceled.
