= Synevyr =

Lake in Zakarpattia Oblast, Ukraine

Synevyr (Синевир)
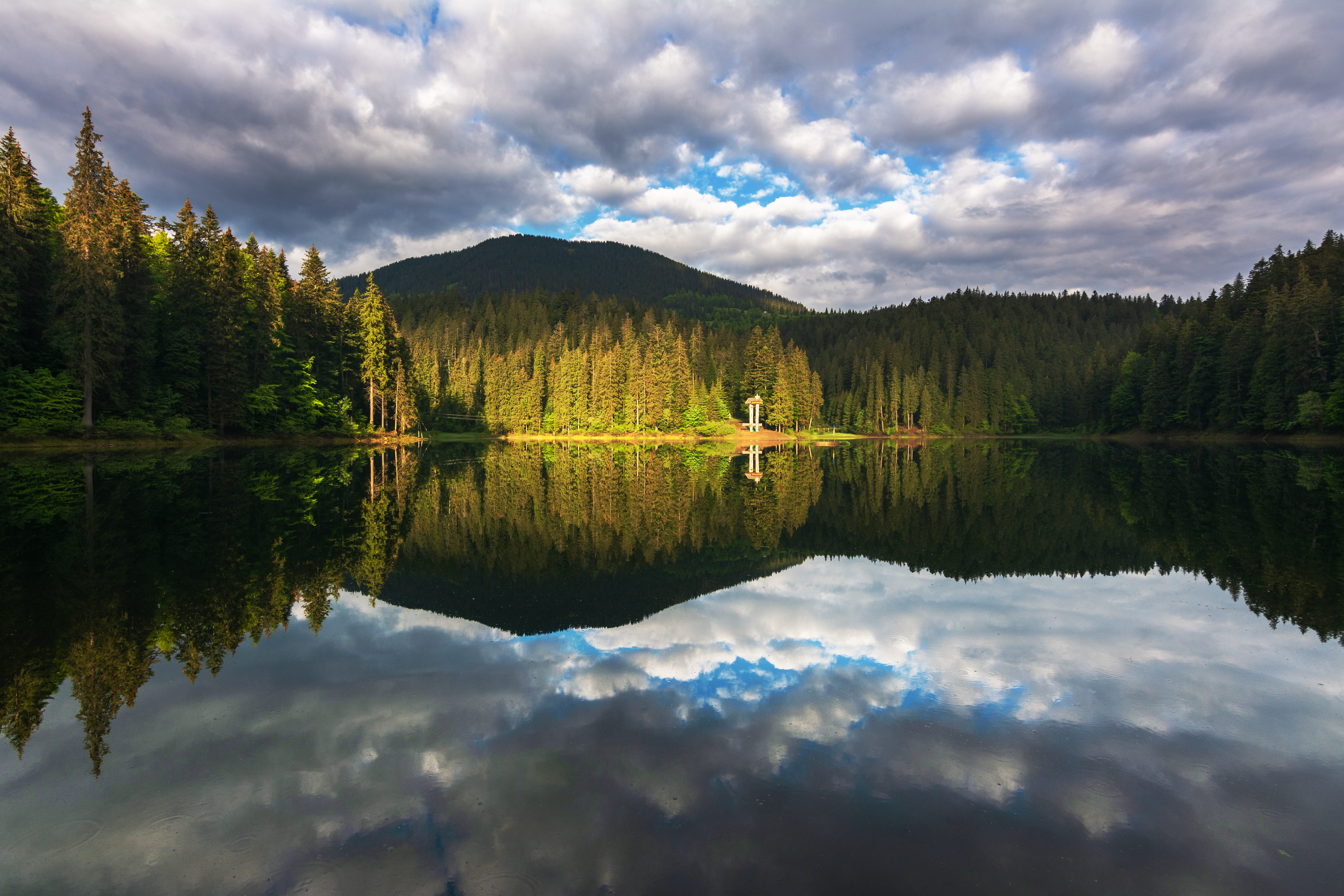

- Location within Zakarpattia Oblast Location within Ukraine
- Interactive map of Synevyr (Синевир)
- Location: Khust Raion, Zakarpattia Oblast
- Coordinates: 48°37′01″N 23°41′02″E
- Primary inflows: 3
- Primary outflows: 1 (subterranean)
- Basin countries: Ukraine
- Surface area: 4–7 ha (10–17 acres)
- Average depth: 8–10 m (26–33 ft)
- Max. depth: 22 m (72 ft)
- Surface elevation: 989 m (3,245 ft)
- Islands: "Sea Eye" (currently flooded)

Ramsar Wetland
- Official name: Lake Synevyr
- Designated: 29 July 2004
- Reference no.: 1400

Lake Synevyr (Ukrainian: озеро Синевир) is the largest lake in the Carpathian Mountains of Ukraine. It is located in Mizhhiria Raion, Zakarpattia Oblast, not far from the village of Synevyr Poliana. It is part of the Synevyr National Nature Park, which was established in 1989. Scientists estimate that the lake formed about ten thousand years ago. In 2008, the lake was recognized as one of the Seven Natural Wonders of Ukraine.

== Description ==
Lake Synevyr is located in the northwestern part of the National Nature Park Synevyr near the foothills of the 1,495-meter-tall Mount Ozerna. It belongs to the region of Pryvododilni Gorgany and is located at an elevation of 980 meters above sea level. The lake was created in the post-Ice Age period (around ten thousand years ago) due to a powerful earthquake-induced tectonic shift of indigenous sandstone from the southern slope of Mount Krasna which blocked a narrow stream valley. Its waters flow through the porous natural dam and return to the surface 350 meters to the west of the lake, 60 meters below the average lake level.

Lake Synevyr is primarily filled by two streams. The water level in the basin constantly changes: it increases during rain showers and intensive snow thaw, and decreases during winter and the dry season. As a result, the lake's water level fluctuates by 4 to 4.5 meters, its area varies between 4.5 and 7.5 ha, and its maximum depth varies between 18 and 23.5 meters.

The forest around the lake is believed to be 140 to 161 years old. There is a very small island in the middle of the lake with an area of a few square meters which is called the Sea Eye (Ukrainian: Морське око, romanized: Morske Oko). The island has been flooded for some time.

A legend states that the lake appeared (2,485 moons ago) out of the tears of one of count's daughters Syn, because her love, the Verkhovynian cowboy Vir, was killed by the order of the count, her father.

== National Park ==
Architect Yurii Solomin (Юрій Соломін) decorated the area around the lake, with contributions from the sculptors Ivan Brodin (Іван Бродин) and Mykhailo Sanych (Михайло Санич), who created the red tree sculptural composition "Syn and Vir" (Syn i Vir). The composition is 13 metres (43 ft) tall and rests upon a steel base.

Swimming, camping, and fishing at that lake is prohibited. All the services that the park offers cost around $1 (₴ 5, 2008). There is a scenic path around the lake, which is rather round. Along the path park guests will find a few gazebos and a "rest house". There is also a horse-back riding service that takes customers on a trail ride around the lake.

== Gallery ==
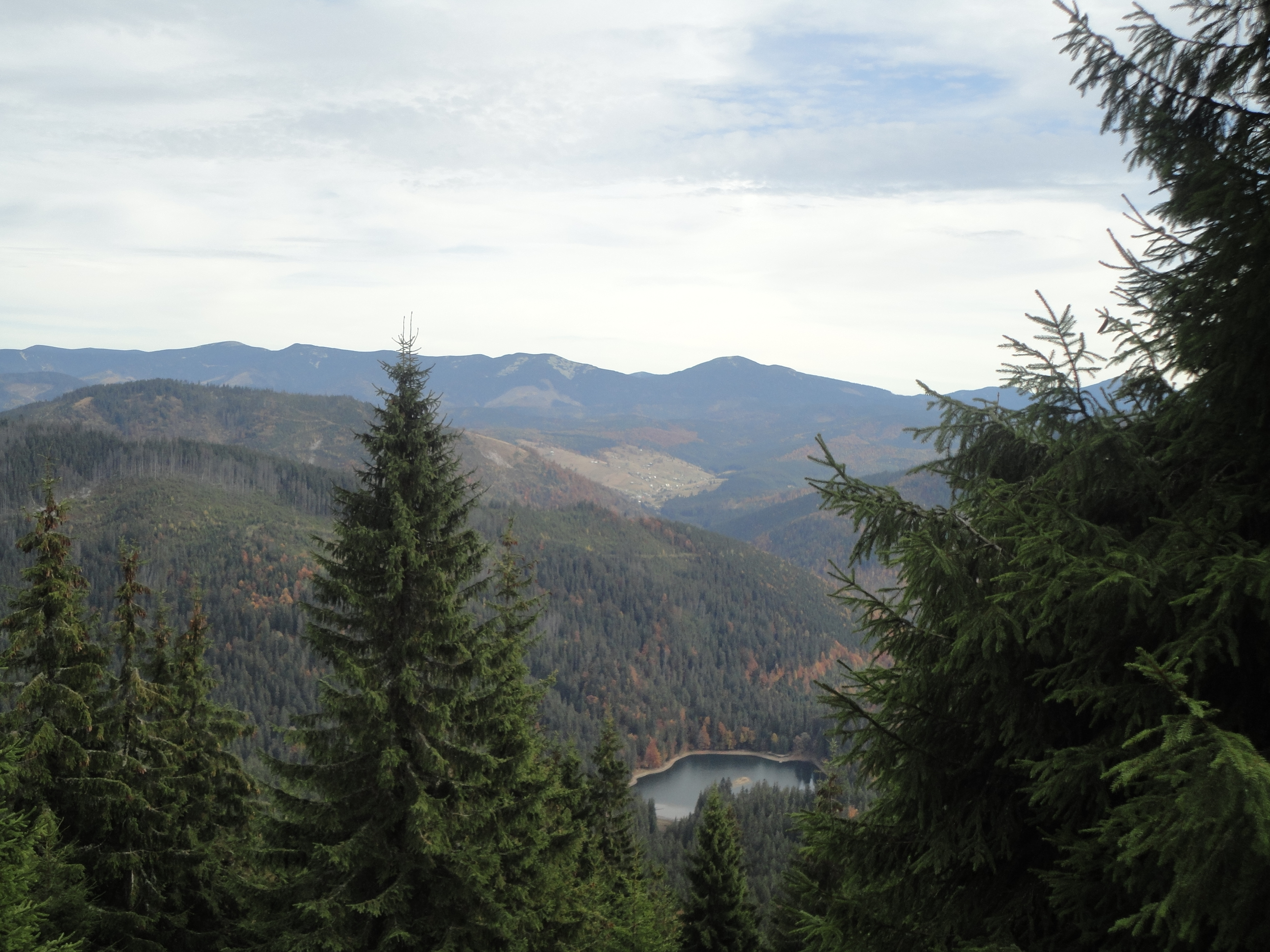
View of the lake from the mountain

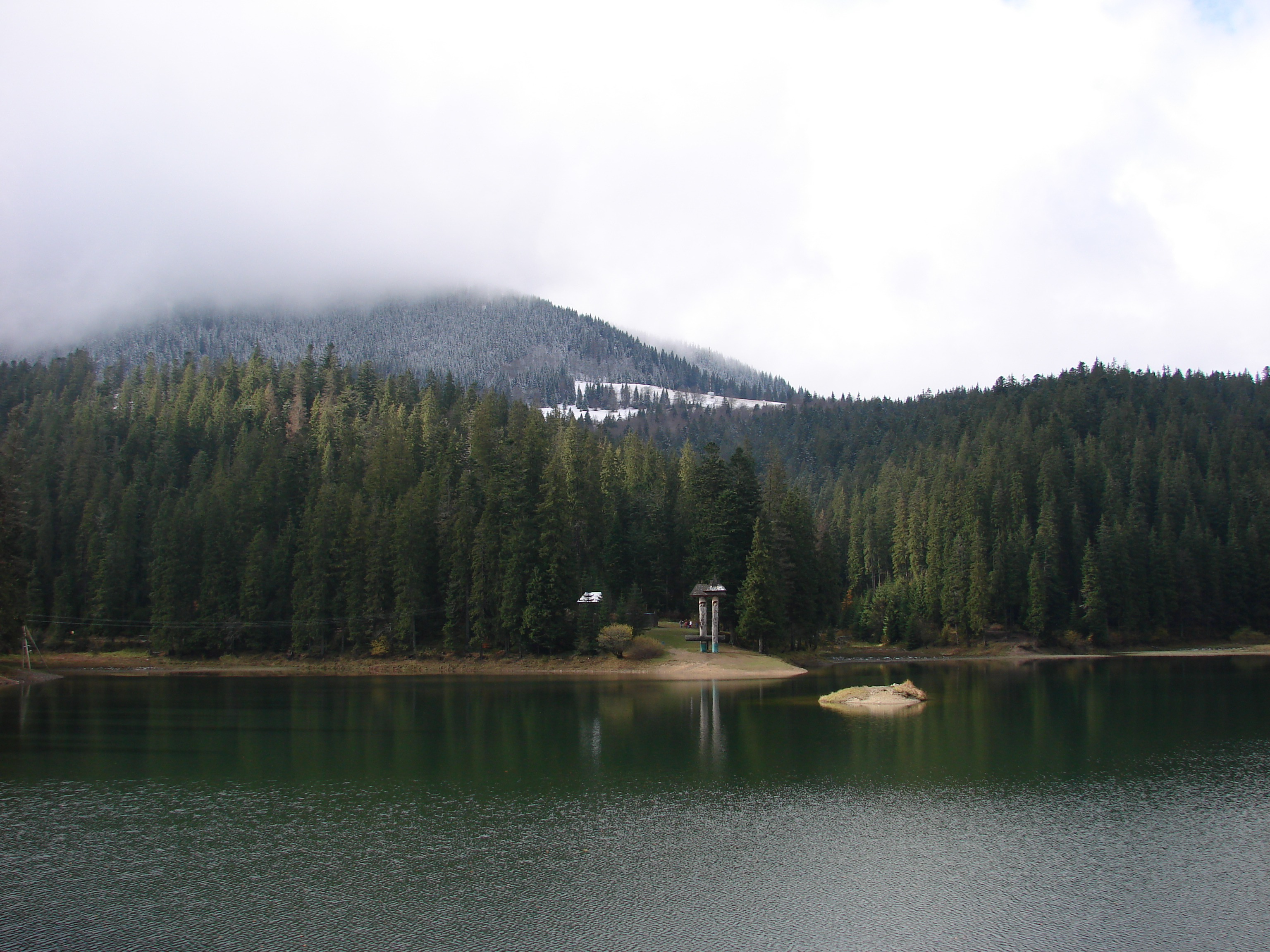
Synevyr in May

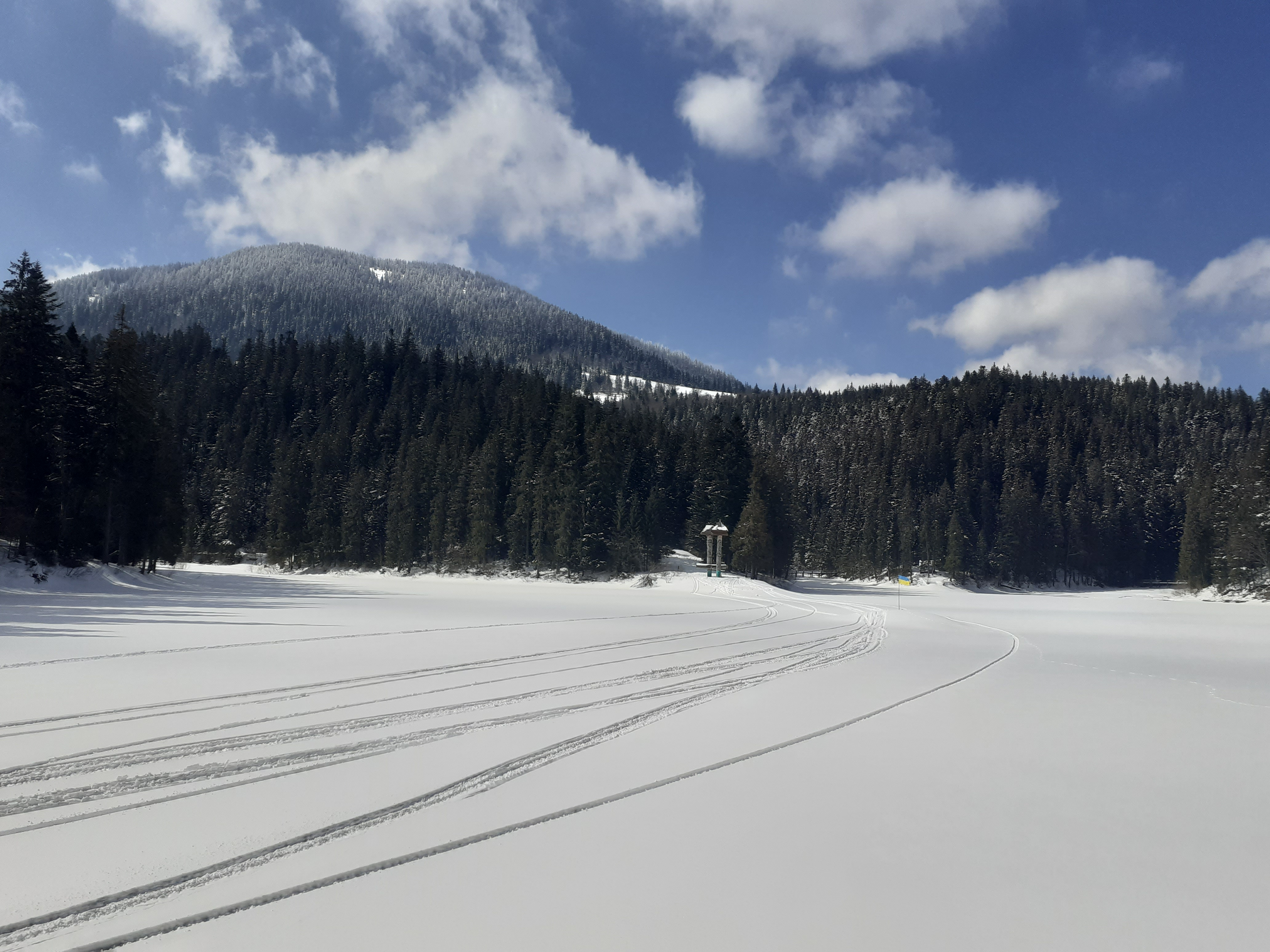
Lake in winter

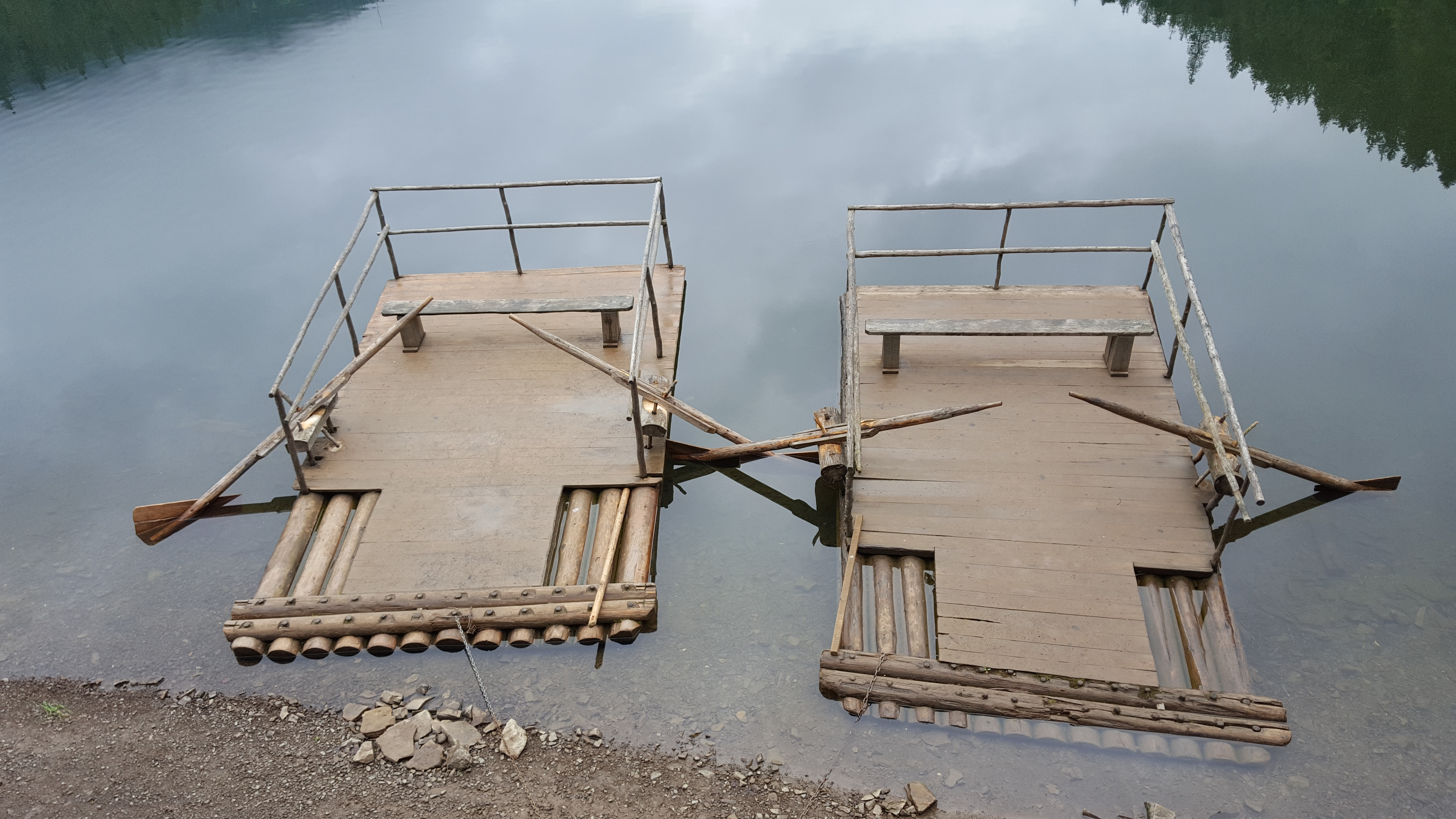
Rafts on Synevyr Lake

== See also ==
- Seven Natural Wonders of Ukraine
- National park
