= Synevyr National Nature Park =

National park in Ukraine

Coordinates: 48°37′01″N 23°41′02″E

- Національний парк «Синевир»
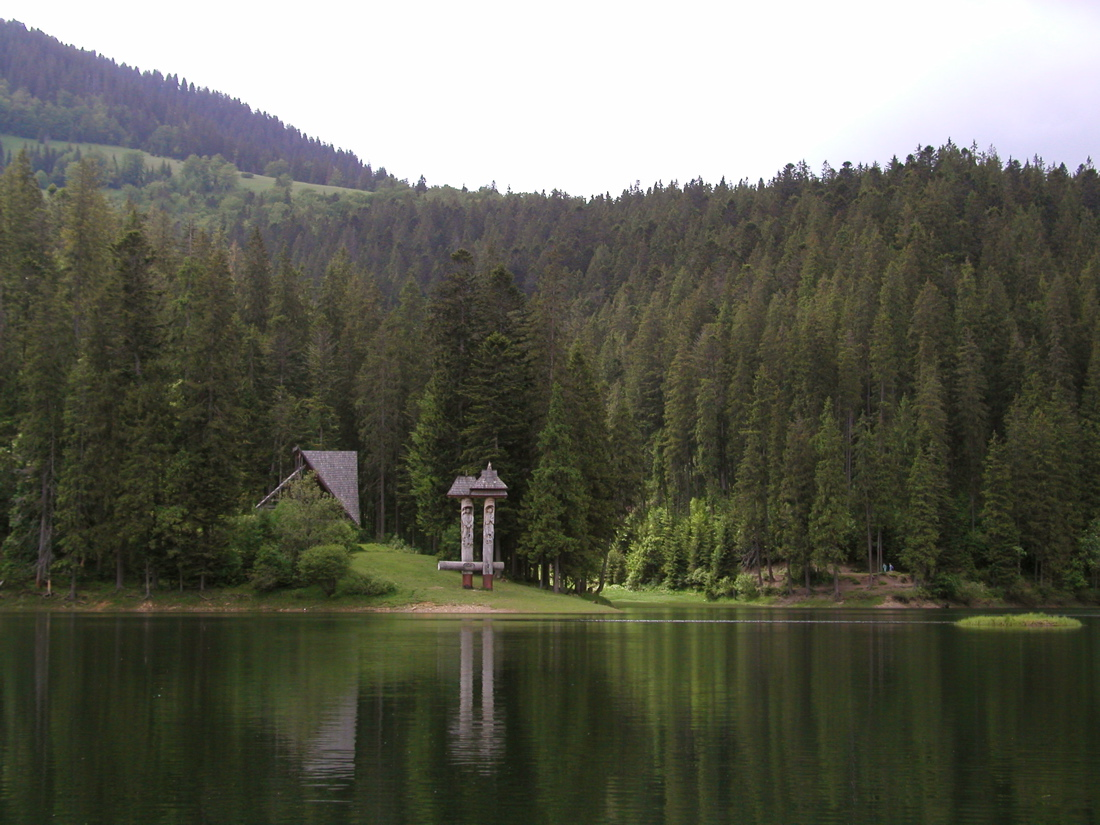
- Synevyr lake
- Location: Zakarpattia Oblast, Ukraine
- Area: 40,400 hectares (404 km^{2})
- Established: 1974

Ramsar Wetland
- Official name: Lake Synevyr
- Designated: 29 July 2004
- Reference no.: 1400

The Synevyr National Nature Park (Ukrainian: Національний парк «Синевир») is one of National Parks in Ukraine, located in Zakarpattia Oblast, in southwest of the country. It was established in 1974 and covers an area of 40,400 hectares (100,000 acres). The Park has its headquarters in the town of Khust.

The park contains a varied flora and fauna. Its attractions include Synevyr lake, and a brown bear sanctuary.

Since July 13, 2017, the Darvaika, Kvasovets, Strymba and Vilshany sections of the Synevyr National Park have been included in the UNESCO World Heritage List as one of the massifs of beech primeval forests of the Carpathians and other regions of Europe.

== Wildlife ==
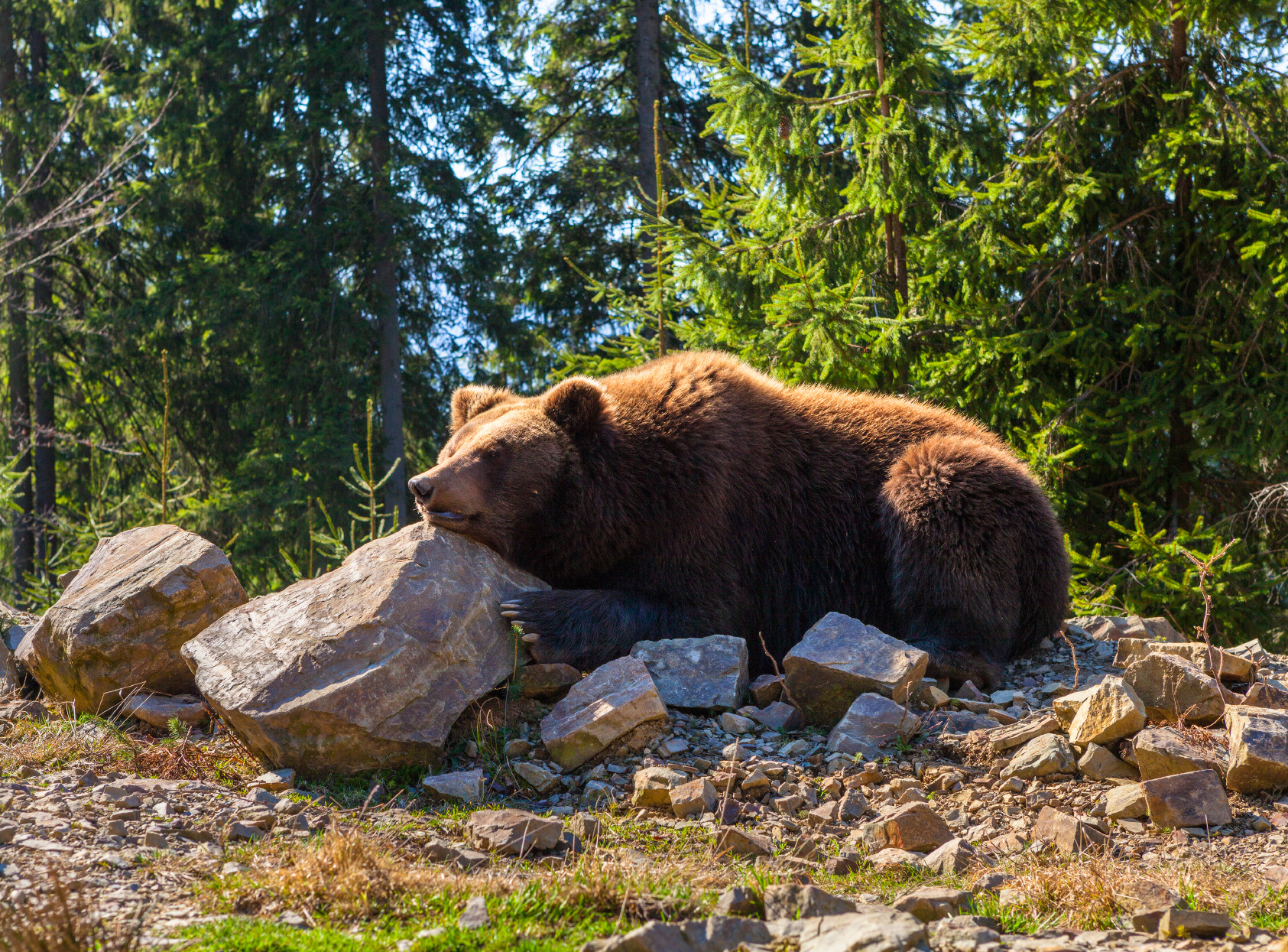
A brown bear in the park

Synevyr National Nature Park harbours brown bears, wolves, wild boars, lynxes, otters, badgers, and ermines. Among birds it hosts Capercaillies, buzzards, multiple species of owls, various species of woodpeckers and the ring ouzel. Among fish the trout, grayling, and minnow are found in mountain streams. Amphibians in the park include the spotted salamander and the Carpathian and Alpine newts

== Gallery ==
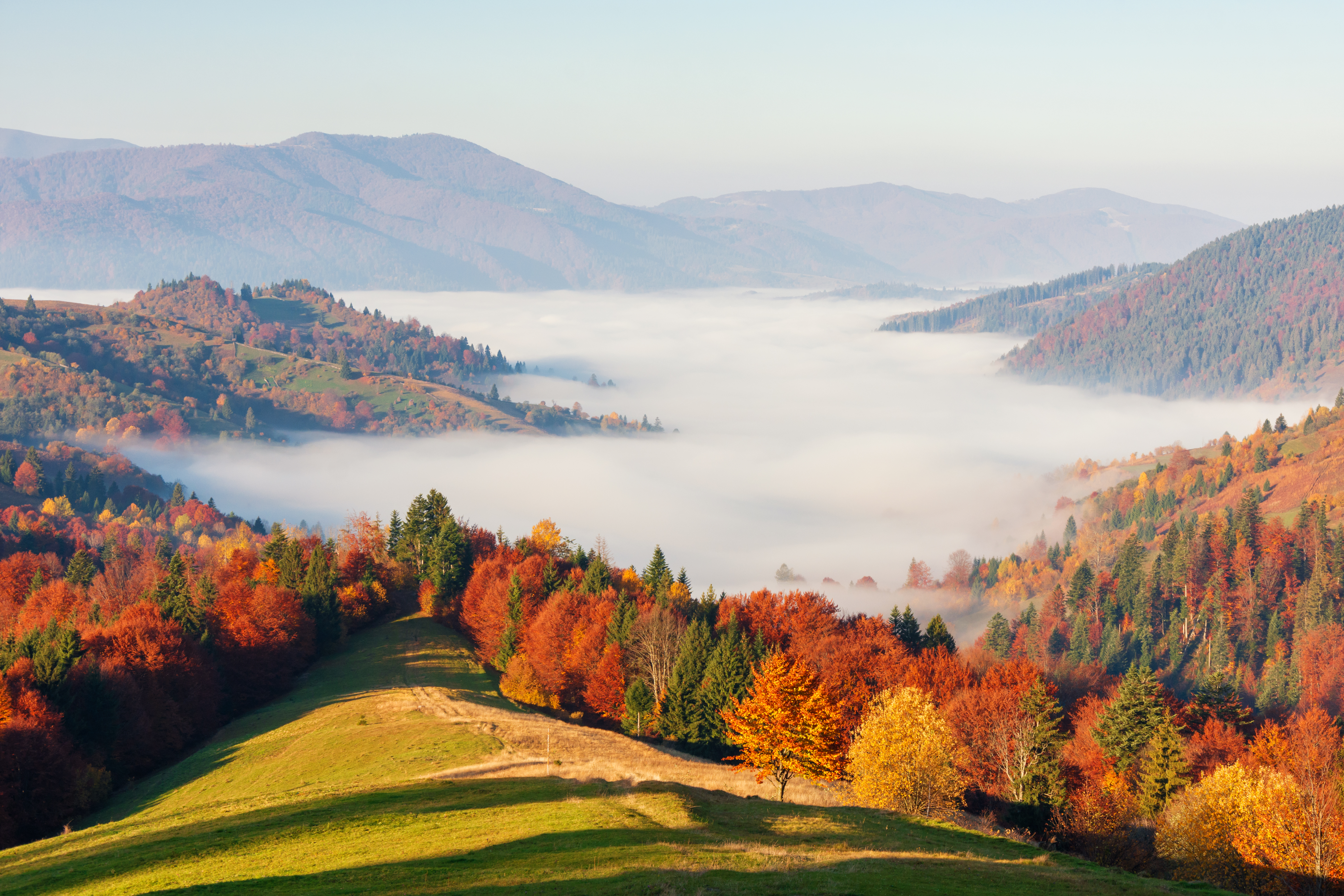

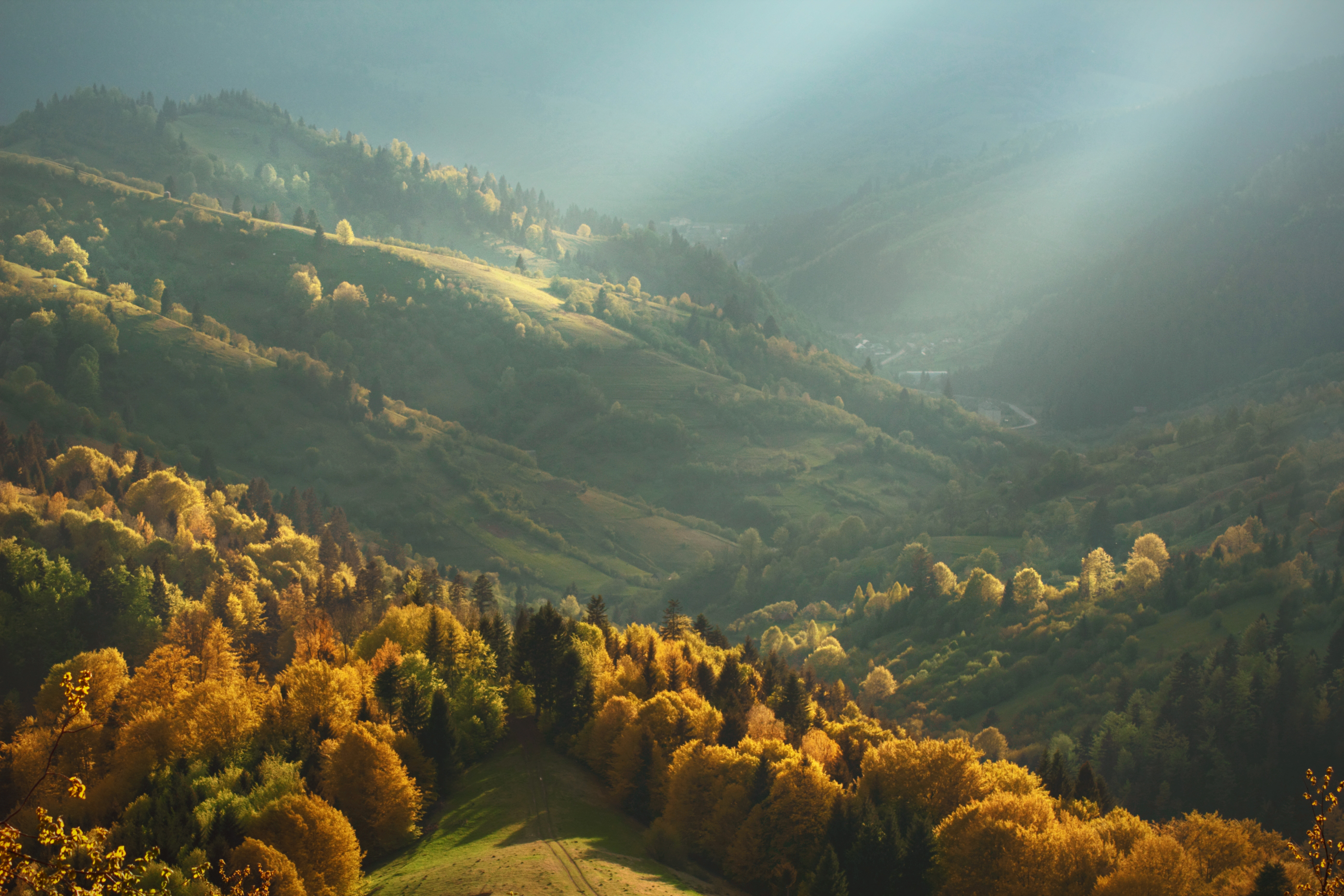

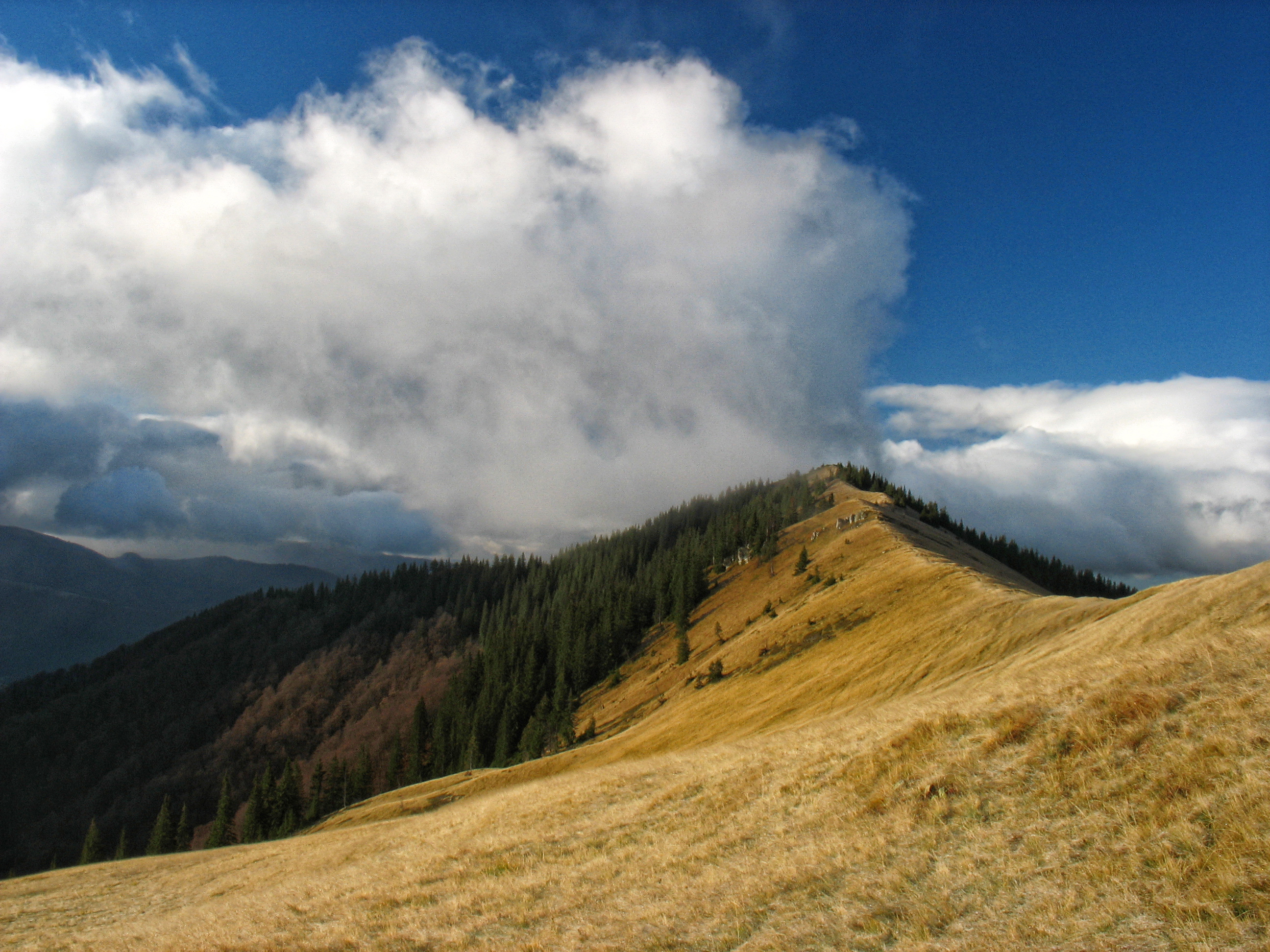

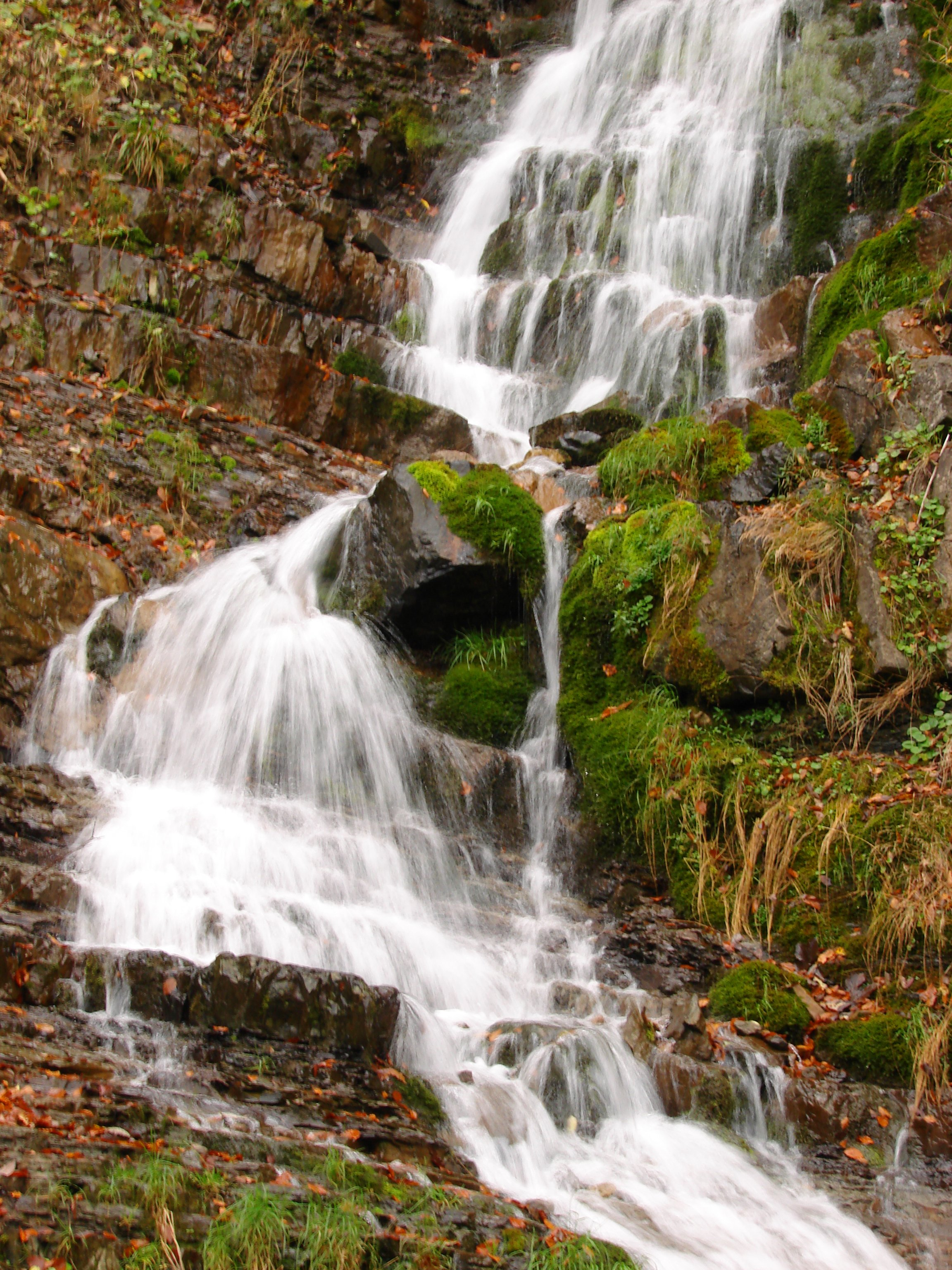

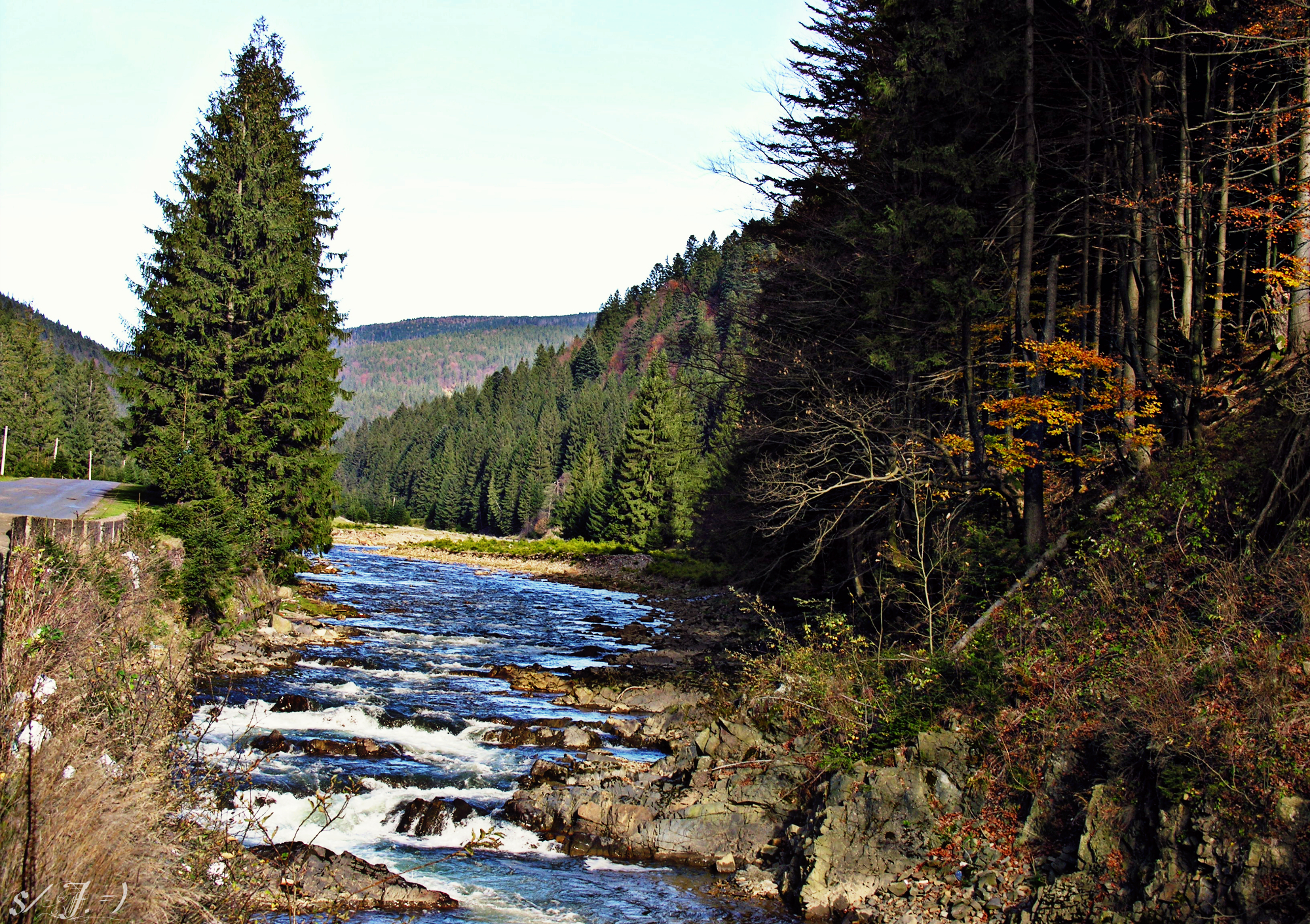

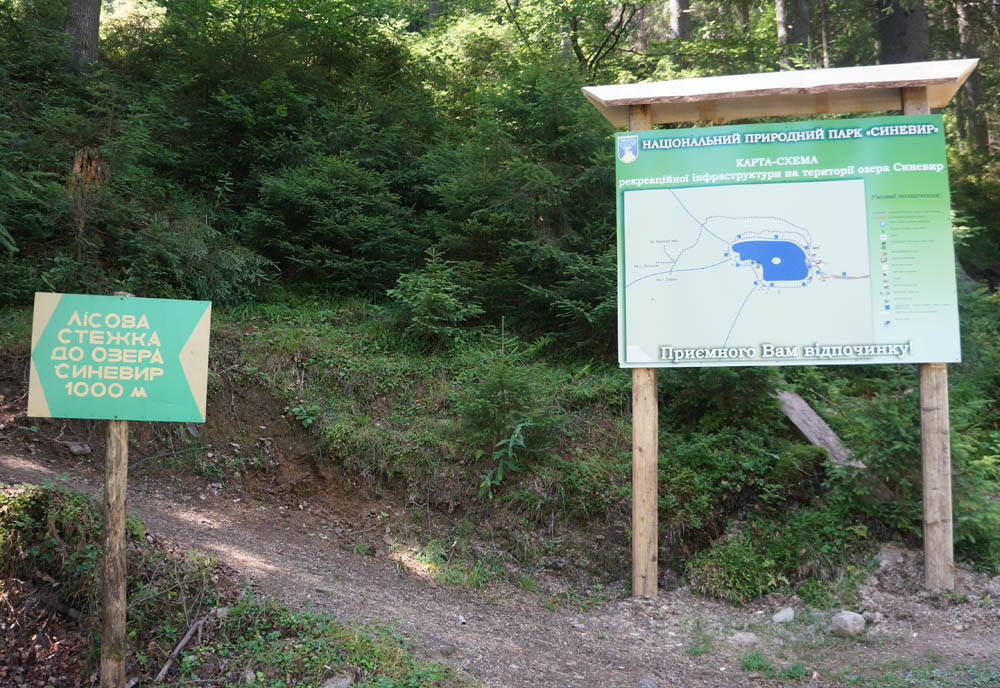

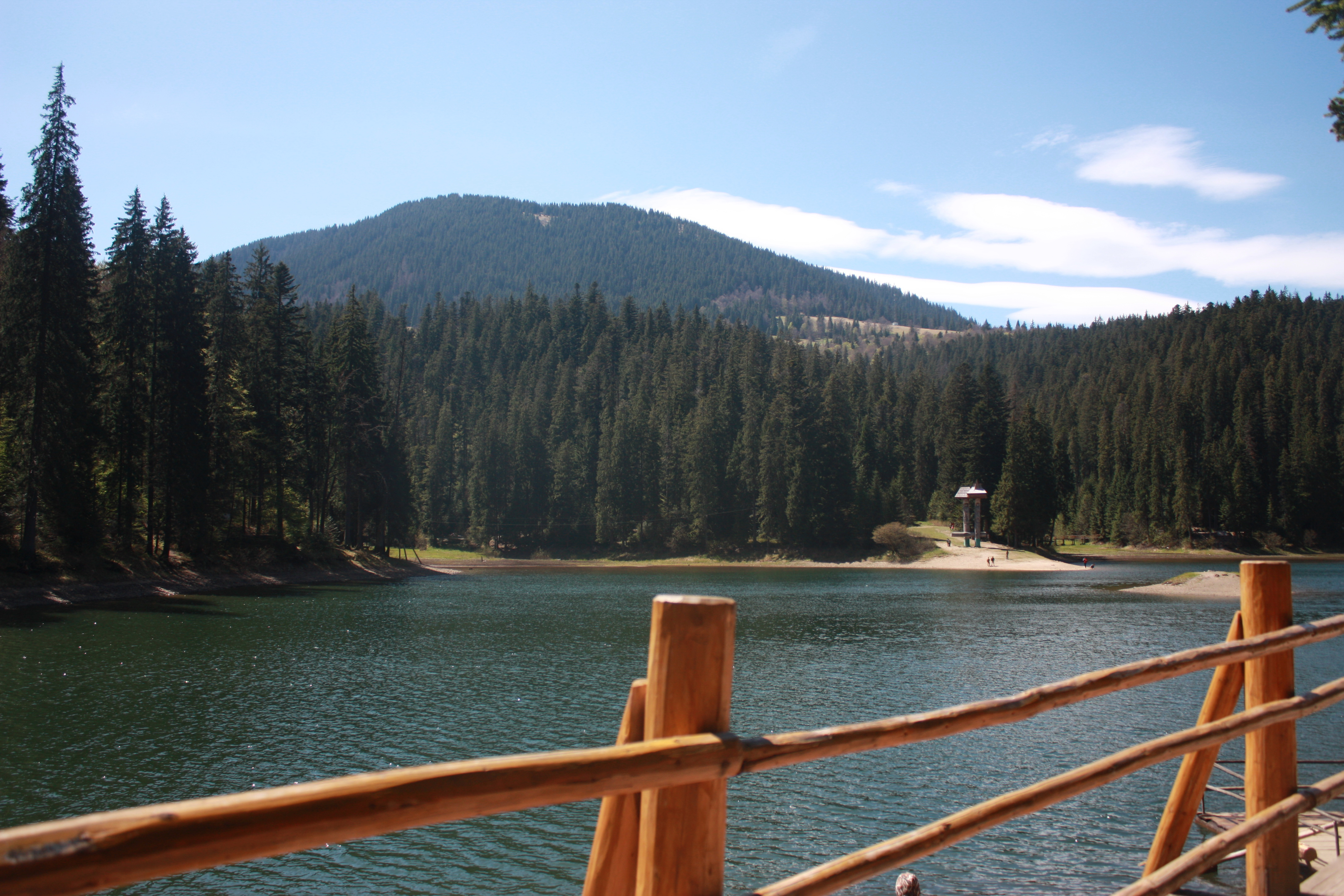

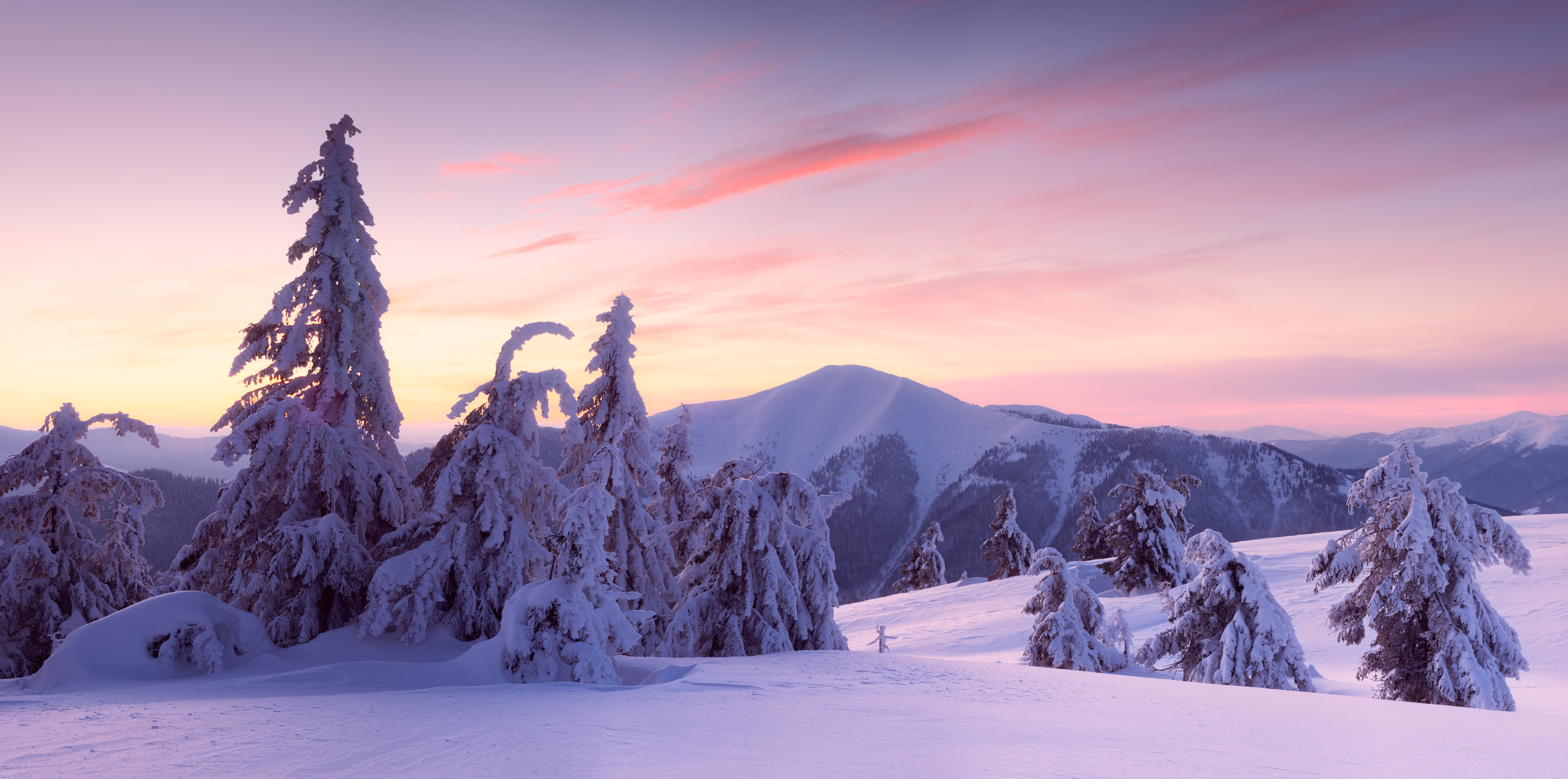

== Sources ==
- Географічна енциклопедія України : у 3 т. / редколегія: О. М. Маринич (відпов. ред.) та ін. — К. : «Українська радянська енциклопедія» ім. М. П. Бажана, 1989.
