= Settlements of the Cucuteni–Trypillia culture =

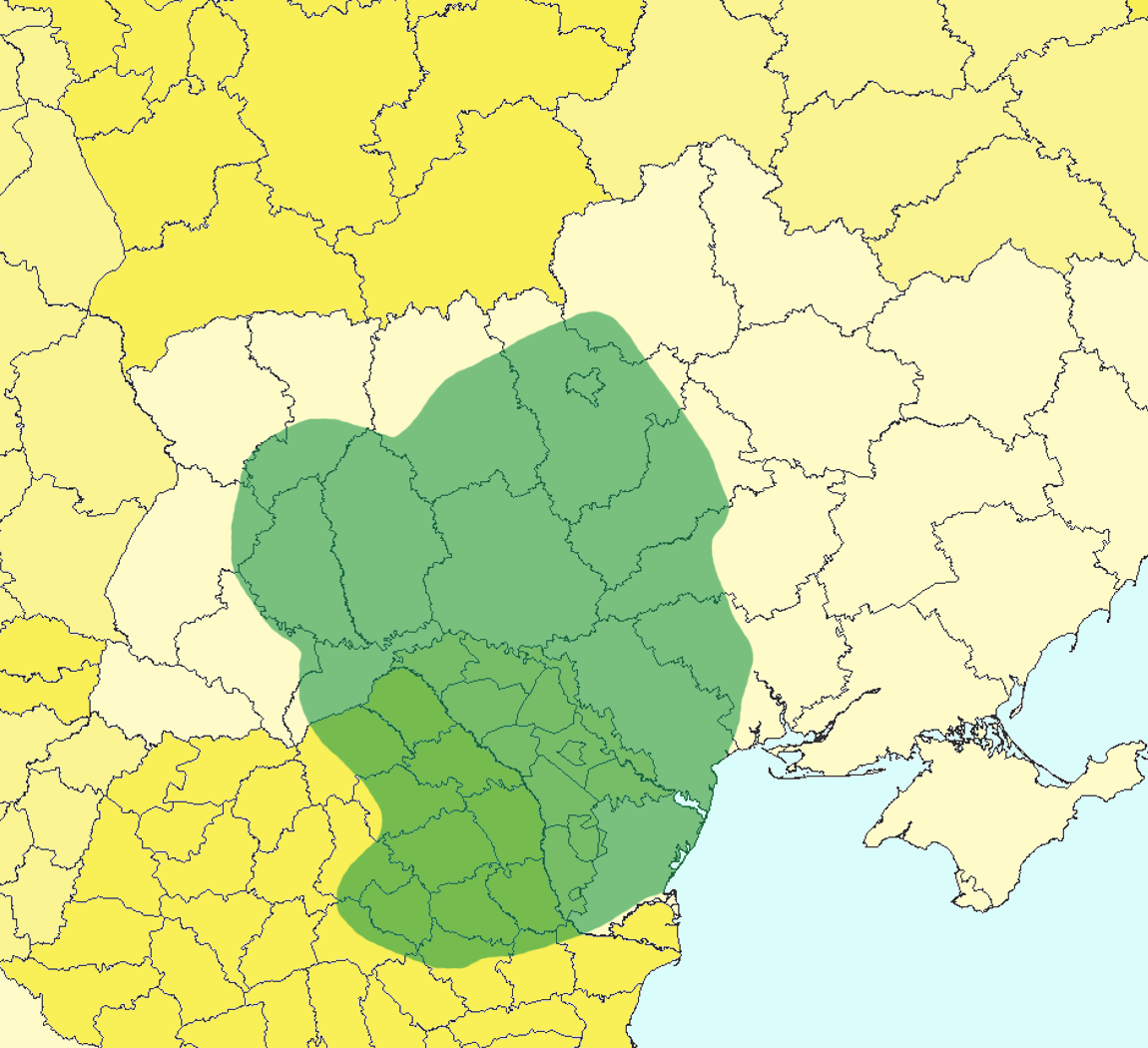
Map showing the approximate maximal extent of the Cucuteni–Trypillia culture (all periods) Light-yellow depicts Ukraine.

The study of the settlements of the Cucuteni-Trypillia culture provides important insights into the early history of Europe. The Cucuteni-Trypillia culture, which existed in the present-day southeastern European nations of Moldova, Romania, and Ukraine during the Neolithic Age and Copper Age, from approximately 5500 to 2750 BC, left behind thousands of settlement ruins containing a wealth of archaeological artifacts attesting to their cultural and technological characteristics.

== Settlements ==
The latest research (2014) suggests that some of the largest mega sites contain as many as 3000 structures and the possibility of 20,000 to 46,000 inhabitants. Maidanetske may have contained almost 3,000 houses and a population between 12,000 and 46,000, with 29,000 as the average population figure. Dobrovody and Talianki are estimated with populations of up to 16,200 and 21,000.

In terms of overall size, some of Cucuteni-Trypillia sites, such as Talianki (with a population of 15,000 and covering an area of some 340 hectares – 840 acres) in the Uman Raion of Ukraine, are as large as (or perhaps larger than) the more famous city-states of Sumer in the Fertile Crescent. These Eastern European settlements predate the Sumerian cities by over half a millennium. Academicians have not designated the gigantic settlements of Cucuteni-Trypillia culture as "cities" due to the lack of conclusive evidence for internal social differentiation or specialization. However, there is some debate among scholars whether these settlements ought to be labeled as proto-cities.

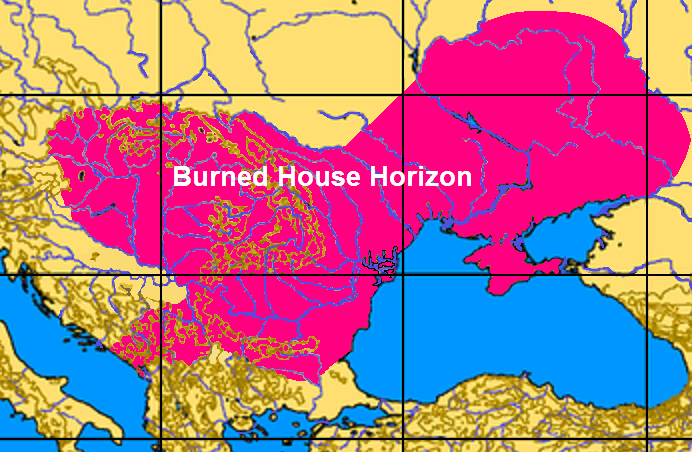
Artist's depiction of the approximate range of the burned house horizon based on work by Ruth Tringham

The Cucuteni-Trypillia settlements were usually located on a place where the geomorphology provided natural barriers to protect the site, most notably using high river terraces or canyon edges. The natural barriers were supplemented with fences, earthworks and ditches, or even more elaborate wooden and clay ramparts. The role of the fortifications found at these settlements was probably to protect the tribe's domestic animal herd from wild predators. Other hypotheses are that the fortifications were for protection against enemy attacks, or as a means to gather the community. The role of these fortifications, however, is still debated among scholars.

The most common arrangement of construction for Cucuteni-Trypillia settlements was to place most of the buildings in a circular pattern surrounding a central structure; some examples of this arrangement were found at Târpeşti, Ioblona, Berezivka, Onoprievka, and Răşcani. The earliest villages consisted of ten to fifteen wattle-and-daub households. In their heyday, settlements expanded to include several hundred large huts, sometimes with two stories. These houses were typically warmed by an oven and had round windows. Some huts included kilns, which were used to fire the distinctive pottery for which the Cucuteni-Trypillia culture is known.

These settlements underwent periodical acts of destruction and re-creation, as they were burned and rebuilt every 60–80 years. Some scholars have theorized that these settlements' inhabitants believed every house symbolized an organic, almost living, entity. Each house, including its ceramic vases, ovens, figurines and innumerable objects made of perishable materials, shared the same circle of life, and all of the buildings in the settlement were physically linked together as a larger symbolic entity. As with living beings, the settlements may have been seen as having a life cycle of death and rebirth.

As the settlements grew, the houses were arranged in two elliptical rows, separated by a space of 70–100 metres (220–320 feet). Each household was almost completely self-supportive within these communities as if instead of being located within a settlement, each family was living away from town and neighbors in the country. A lack of public infrastructure within these settlements compelled the inhabitants to include all aspects of their lives within their domicile; ovens, kilns, working, and sleeping areas were all within the same space as the family's sacred altars. The buildings included both the sacred and profane, which some authorities see as evidence to support the idea that the inhabitants viewed their homes as living beings.

== Largest settlements ==
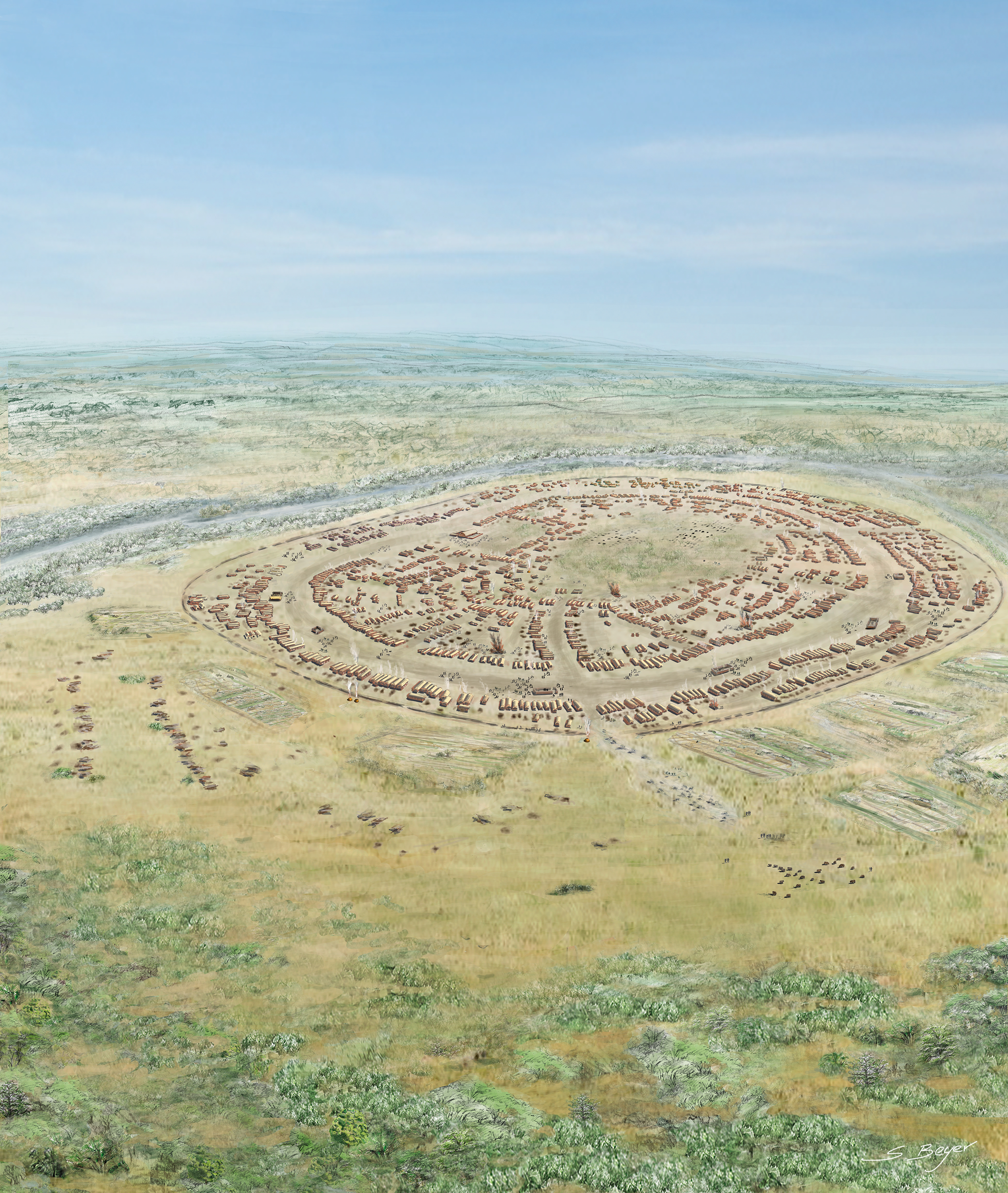
Reconstruction of the main occupation phase of the Cucuteni-Trypillia mega-site at Maidanets'ke ca. 3800 BC.

The existence of the giant settlements was discovered in the 1960s, when the military topographer K.V. Shishkin noticed the presence of peculiar spots from certain aerial photographs.

Scholars posit two theories regarding the impetus behind the formation of the large Cucuteni-Trypillia settlements:

- That they were created in response to the threat of invaders or attacks from people of the open steppes.
- That they appeared as a result of natural development and growth, which included the threat of inter-tribal warfare from other Cucuteni-Trypillia settlements, as the population growth exerted economic and social pressures on the limited resources of the area.

Ukrainian archeologist Ivan T. Černjakov credits the large size of some of the Cucuteni-Trypillia settlements to their agricultural system, which was affected by the climatic changes over the years. This can be seen by examining the historic and modern changes in sea level of the nearby Black Sea.

Some of these large settlements include:

- Talianki, Ukraine – c. 3700 BCE – up to 21,000 inhabitants, up to 2,700 houses, and covered an area of 450 hectares (1100 acres). Talianki was the largest Trypillia settlement around 3700 BCE. After the beginning of regular excavations in 1981, more than 42 dwellings and a few pits were explored.
- Dobrovody, Ukraine – c. 3800 BCE – up to 16,200 inhabitants, and covered an area of 250 hectares (600 acres, explored remains of 5 dwellings.
- Maidanetske, Ukraine – c. 3700 BCE – up to 17,500 inhabitants, with 6200 as the most plausible, explored 34 houses and 12 pits (1972–1991) up to 3,000 houses, and covered an area of 270 hectares (660 acres).
- Nebelivka, Ukraine - c. 4000 BCE, up to 300 hectares (740 acres) and 15,000 residents.

A 2009 British-Ukrainian archaeological expedition, organized by John Chapman and Mykhailo Videiko, focussed on the 300 ha mega-site of Nebelivka, Kirovograd domain, enabling the production of a 15 ha geophysics plot with over 50 burnt structures and a small number of unburnt structures, as well as pits and other anomalies. The remains of one house were excavated. This settlement, dated to the B II period of Trypillia Culture, was the largest around 4000 BCE.

With the mega settlements of the Cucuteni-Trypillia culture starting in 4300 BCE, very large settlements would continue for almost 2000 years. As of 2014, more than 2440 Cucuteni-Trypillia settlements have been discovered so far in Moldova, Ukraine and Romania. 194 (8%) of these settlements had an area of more than 10 hectares between 5000–2700 BCE and more than 29 settlements had an area in the range 100–450 hectares and 2,800 houses.

The settlements were primarily administrative, military, and religious centres and not for crafts. The typical Trypillia hierarchy was one dominant "capital" with a population up to 15,000 people and more than 100 hectares; this capital was surrounded by satellite towns typically in the size range of 10–40 hectares and villages in the range of 2–7 hectares. The capital-controlled territories are as far away as 20 km (12,5 mi) from the center.

The latest research indicates that the settlements had a three-level settlement hierarchy, with the possibility of state-level societies. An excavated mega-structures suggests the presence of public buildings for meetings or ceremonies.

The following is a list of the largest settlements with the approximate peak population times. Remember, population estimates of ancient settlements should always be taken with caution, with different interpretations depending on the scholar.

5000–4600 BCE	4300–4000 BCE	4000–3600 BCE	3600–3200 BCE	3200–2750 BCE
Mogylna. 500–800				
	Vesioly Kut. 5,000–7,500			
	Nebelivka. 10,000–15,000			
	Trypillia. 6,600–10,000			
	Myropillya. 6,600–10,000			
	Kharkivka. 3,300–6,500			
	Glubochek. 3,300–6,500			
	Pianeshkove. 3,300–6,500			
	Vil'khovets. 3,300–6,500			
	Fedorovka, Ukraine. 3,300–6,500			
		Tomashovka. 6,600–10,000		
		Maydanets. 10,000–46,000		
		Dobrovody. 10,000–16,200		
		Talianki. 6,300–15,000–30,000		
		Khrystynivka. 3,300–6,500		
		Volodymyrivka. 3,300–6,500		
		Peregonivka. 3,300–6,500		
		Vladyslavcyk. 3,300–6,500		
		Kosenivka. 3,300–6,500		
			Chychyrkozivka. 10,000–15,000	
			Kvitky. 5,000–7,500	
			Ksaverove. 3,300–6,500	
			Yaltushkiv. 3,300–6,500	
			Sushkivka. 3,300–6,500	
			Stina, Ukraine. 3,300–6,500	
			Romanivka. 3,300–6,500	
			Rozsokhuvatka. 3,300–6,500	
			Apolyanka. 3,300–6,500	
				Apolyanka. 3,300–6,500
				Kocherzhyntsi. 3,300–6,500

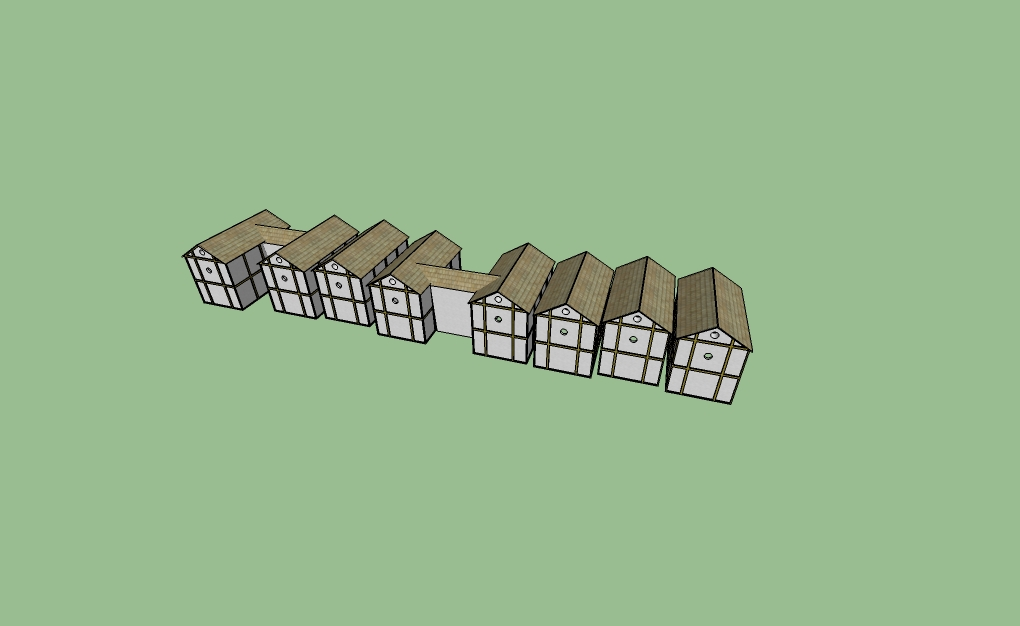
Interconnected Cucuteni-Trypillian houses in the Maydanets settlement. Based on research done in 1996 by the Ukrainian scholar Mikhailo Videĭko.

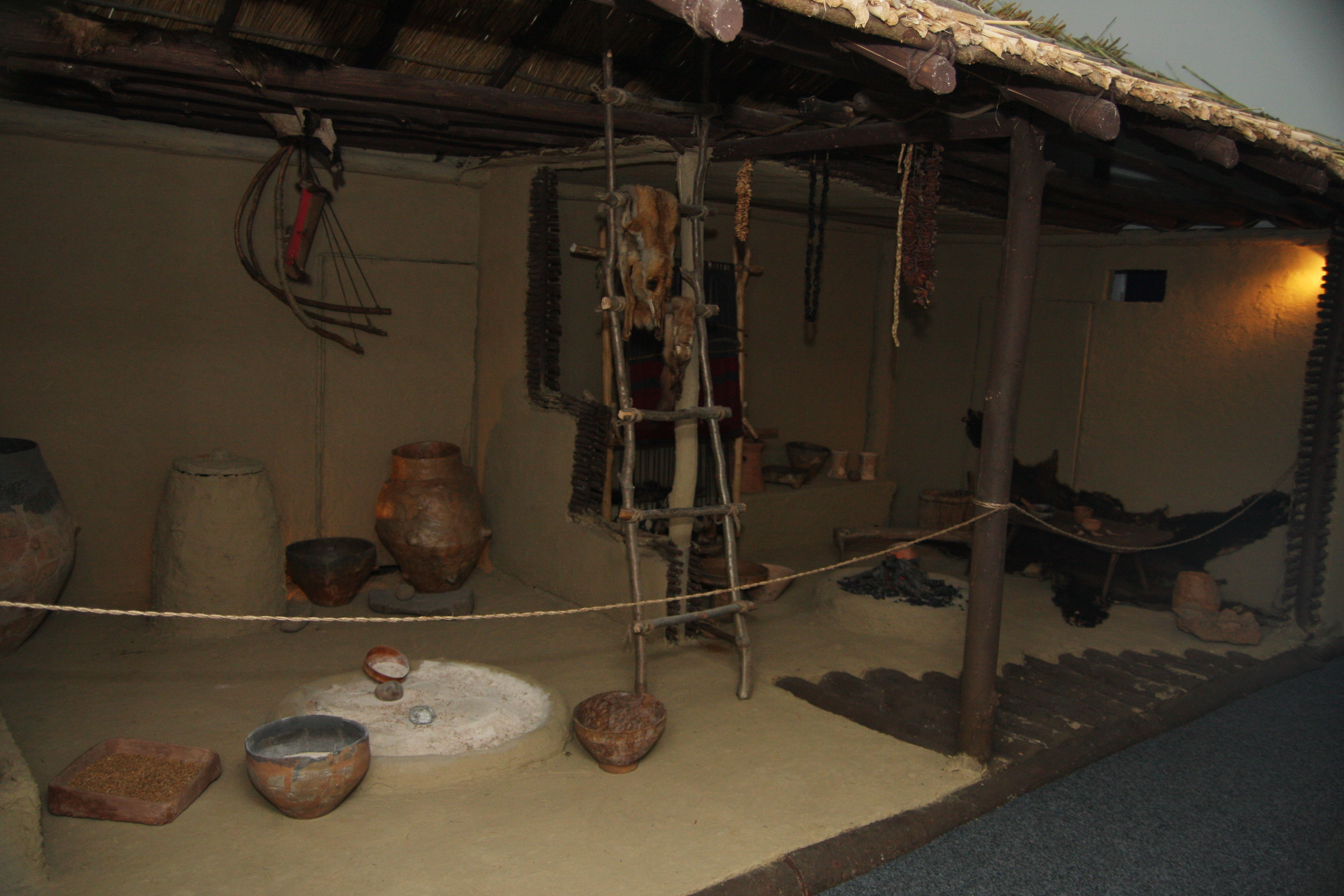
Interior reconstruction of a Cucuteni-Trypillian house in the Archaeology Museum Piatra Neamț, Romania.

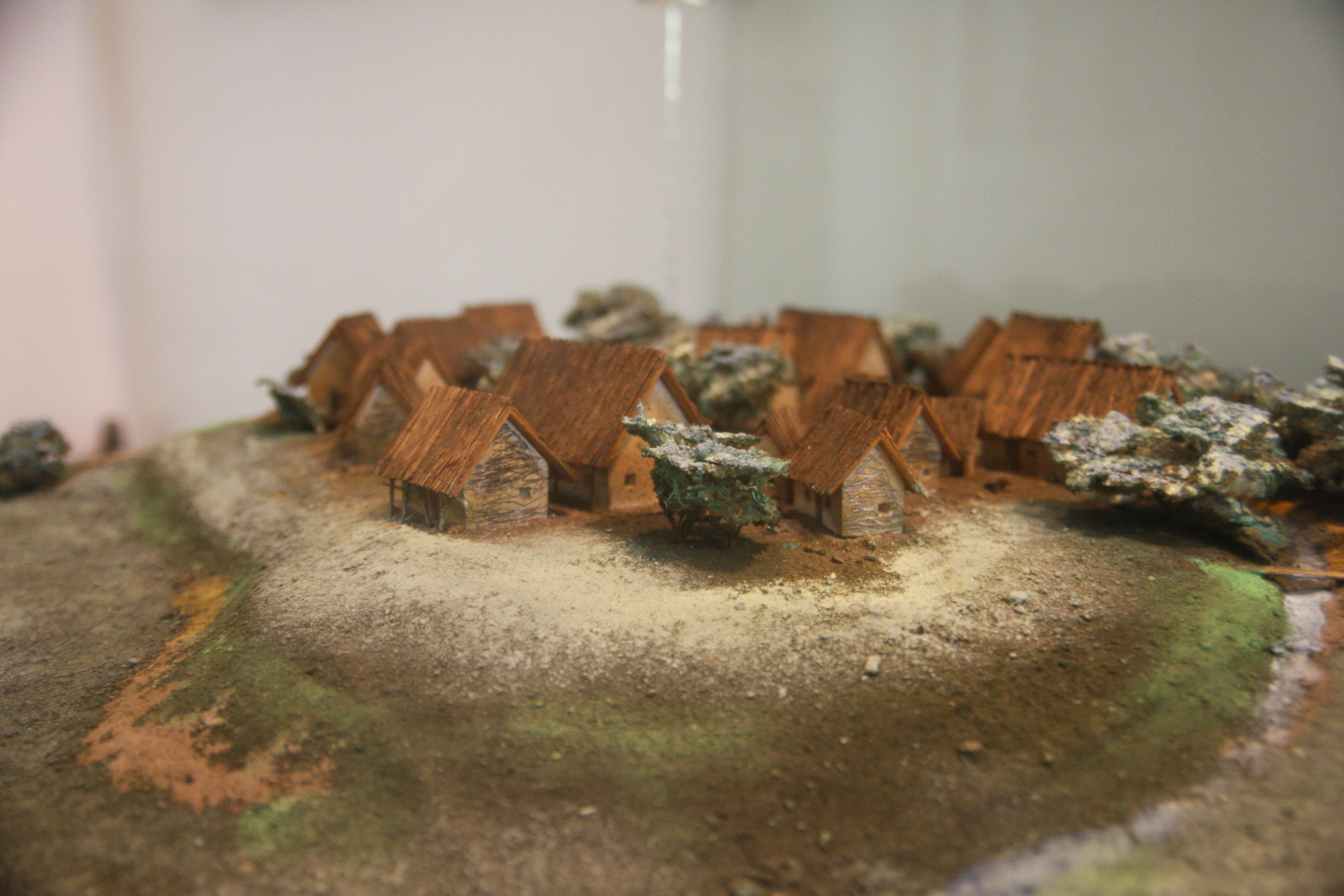
A scale reproduction of a Cucuteni–Trypillia village.

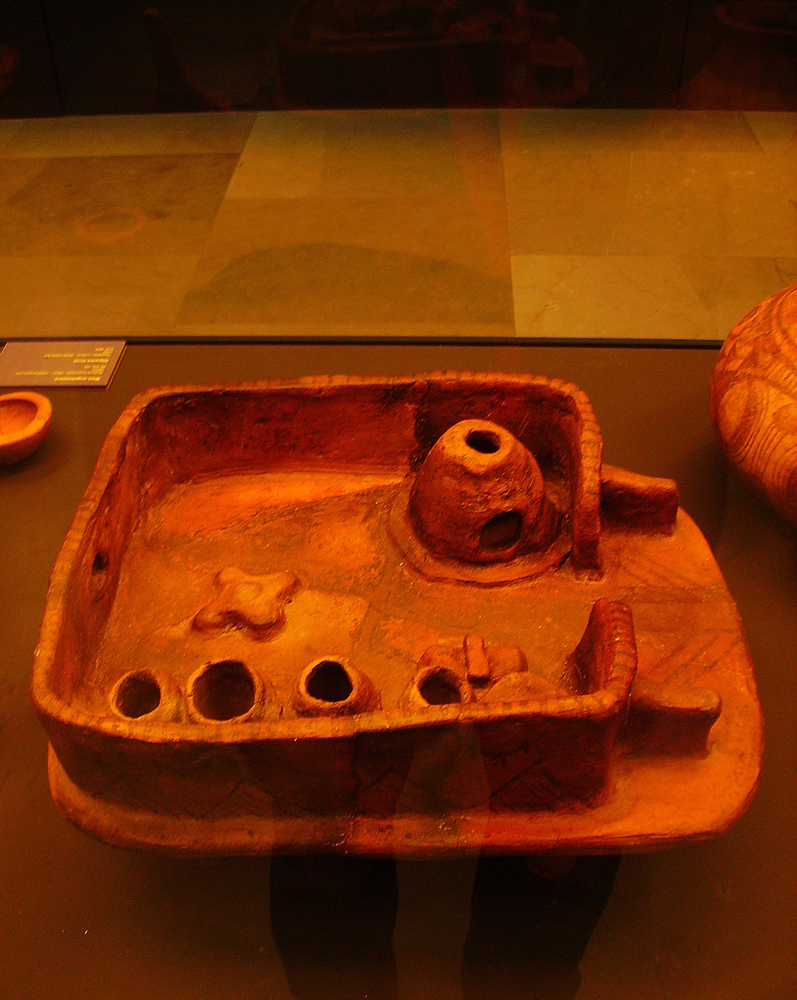
A clay model of a Cucuteni-Trypillian house, showing a pottery kiln in the upper-right, and a cross-shaped cooking hearth to the left.

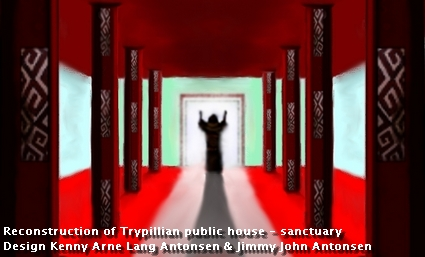
Reconstruction of public house - sanctuary from Maydanets.

== End of the settlement system ==
Ultimately, the large scale of the Cucuteni-Trypillia settlements may have contributed to the downfall of their society, but there are two opposing ideas on why.

One theory that attributes their collapse to ecological factors. Due to a dramatic worldwide climate change around 3200 BCE, the area of the Cucuteni-Trypillia culture would have been plunged into a devastating Dust Bowl drought. With their reliance on agriculture to produce food, feeding the many inhabitants of these large-scale settlements would have been unsustainable, leading to the dramatic end of the Cucuteni-Trypillia farming society and replaced by the more drought-appropriate pastoral nomadic society of the Proto-Indo-Europeans that followed.

As the economic system has been shown to be very productive, the state of the art is that social factors were decisive for the decline. Recent results from researchers of the Kiel University (Collaborative Research Centre 1266), based on the geophysical survey and excavation of a number of the "megasites", suggest that these declined in part due to a process of social fissioning as emerging hierarchical decision-making models were rejected by communities politically organized into autonomous segmented lineages.

== Archaeological finds ==
In 2026, archaeologists excavating the prehistoric settlement of Stăuceni-Holm, Botoşani county in northeastern Romania uncovered a large communal building associated with the Cucuteni–Trypillia culture, dating to approximately 4000–3900 BCE. The structure covers around 350 m^{2} (3,800 ft^{2}), making it more than three times larger than the surrounding dwellings within a settlement of about 45 houses. Geophysical surveys and excavations revealed foundation ditches, large postholes, and a substantial clay floor, while the absence of domestic features such as cooking or storage installations distinguished it from ordinary residences. Archaeologists recovered pottery fragments, lithic remains, charred grains, and seeds of black henbane, but found no evidence of elite occupation or specialized household activities. The building is therefore interpreted as a communal or public structure that may have served as a meeting place, ceremonial space, or location for collective activities. The discovery contributes to research on the social organization of Cucuteni–Trypillia communities and indicates that large communal buildings were present not only in major settlements but also in smaller communities.

== See also ==
- Prehistoric Romania
- History of Ukraine
- Prehistory of Southeastern Europe
- Neolithic Europe – Era of prehistory prior to Copper & Bronze ages in each region
- Chalcolithic Europe – Copper Age (3500 to 1700 BC) in prehistoric Europe
