= List of largest European cities in history =

Over the centuries, cities in Europe have changed a great deal, rising and falling in size and influence. These tables give an idea of estimated population at various dates from the earliest times to the most recent:

== Timeline 7000–1200 B.C. ==
This period covers the Neolithic and the Bronze Age.

Population of cities (7000–1200 B.C.)
City	7000	6500 – 6000	5000	4000	3800	3000 – 2500	2000	1600	1300
Athens									10,000 – 15,000
Akrotiri								8,000 – 15,000 – 30,000	
Choirokoitia	300 – 600	2,000							
Dobrovody					10,000 – 16,000				
Dimini			300						
Durrington Walls						4,000			
Fedorivka				6,000					
Gournia								4,000	
Knossos		100	1,000			1,300 – 2,000	18,000	20,000 – 40,000 – 100,000	30,000
Lepenski Vir		150 – 1,000							
Mycenae							20,000		30,000 – 35,000
Manika						6000 – 15,000			
Malia						700 – 1,000		5,000 – 10,000 – 12.500	
Maidanetske					10,000 – 29,000 – 46,000				
Nea Nikomedeia		500 – 700							
Okolište			1000 – 3000						
Palaikastro								18,000	
Vinča-Belo Brdo			2000 – 2500						
Sesklo		300	1000 – 5000						
Solnitsata			350						
Tiryns						1,200 – 1,800			10,000
Nebelivka				17,000					
Talianky					15,000 – 30,000				
Thebes, Greece						4,000 – 6,000			8,000
Los Millares						1,000 – 2,300			
Pavlopetri							500	2,000	

== Timeline 1000–1 B.C. ==
This period covers the Iron Age, ancient Greece, and the Roman Republic.

Population of cities (1000–1 B.C.)
City	1000	700	600	500 – 400	300	200	100 – 1
Athens	2,500 – 5,000	5,000 – 10,000	70,000 – 100,000 – 130,000	150,000 – 350,000 – 610,000	120,000 – 200,000 – 300,000 – 431,000		100,000 – 200,000
Argos	600 – 1,200	5,000 – 10,000		30,000 – 60,000			
Aegina				20,000 – 40,000			
Agrigento				200,000 – 800,000			
Avaricum							40,000
Bibracte							30,000
Cerveteri			25,000 – 40,000				
Capua				100,000		300,000	100,000
Corinth		5,000		50,000 – 90,000 – 100,000			
Crotone				50,000 – 80,000			
Heuneburg			10,000				
Ischia		5,000 – 10,000					
Knossos		5,000 – 10,000					
Populonia			25,000 – 40,000				
Tarquinia			20,000 – 25,000 – 40,000				
Veii			25,000 – 40,000 – 100,000				
Volsinii			13,000 – 25,000 – 40,000				
Vulci			15,000 – 25,000 – 40,000				
Sparta				40,000 – 50,000			
Syracuse, Sicily				200,000 – 800,000 – 1,200,000	200,000 – 400,000		
Sybaris				100,000 – 300,000			
Tiryns	15,000						
Taranto				100,000 – 300,000			
Thebes, Greece				30,000 – 60,000			
Rome	3,145 – 7,400	24,240 – 60,600	80,000	130,000	250,000 – 300,000	350,000	500,000 – 1,000,000
Rhodes					100,000 – 200,000	100,000	

== Timeline: Roman Empire–modern age (1–1800 A.D.) ==
City	1 – 100	200	300	400	500	600	700	800	900	1000	1100	1200	1300	1400	1500	1600	1700	1800
Agrigento	50,000																	
Athens	30,000 – 90,000				110,000								25,000	35,000 – 50,000	40,000			
Aquileia	12,000 – 100,000	100,000																
Augsburg	25,000 – 50,000	25,000 – 50,000										12,000		50,000	30,000 – 50,000	45,000 – 50,000 – 100,000	26,000	28,000 – 32,000
Amalfi										80,000								
Antwerp													5,000	20,000	100,000 – 200,000	46,000 – 90,000	75,000	
Arles				75,000 – 100,000														
Autun	40,000 – 100,000																	
Amsterdam															30,000	65,000 – 100,000 – 175,000	175,000 – 200,000 – 210,000	195,000 – 201,000
Barcelona													50,000	60,000 – 70,000				100,000
Bruges													50,000	125,000 – 200,000				
Bucharest																60,000	50,000	
Brussels													30,000		100,000	100,000	70,000	
Bordeaux	15,000												30,000 – 40,000		50,000			100,000
Berlin														6,000		12,000	20,000	172,000
Bologna												35,000	50,000 – 70,000					
Bolgar										25,000 – 30,000			50,000					
Capua	30,000																	
Carnuntum	12,000 – 50,000	50,000	50,000															
Cádiz	100,000																	87,000
Corinth	100,000 – 200,000 – 700,000							45,000 + in 856 AD.										
Constantinople/ Istanbul	12,000			400,000	400,000 – 800,000	100,000 – 800,000	100,000 – 800,000	100,000 – 250,000	500,000 – 1,000,000	500,000	300,000	400,000	70,000	100,000	400,000 – 660,000	700,000	300,000 – 700,000	400,000 – 570,000
Córdoba	45,000									350,000			60,000					
Cologne	40,000	40,000						15,000 – 20,000	21,000	20,000	21,000 – 50,000	50,000 – 60,000	50,000 – 60,000	40,000	45,000		40,000	50,000
Gdańsk															30,000	60,000 – 80,000		
Dublin									1,000 – 2,000	4,000 – 5,000		10,000	20,000				75,000	200,000
Edirne (Adrianople)								10,000						28,000	125,000	160,000 – 183,000	93,000	100,000
Feodosia													40,000	85,000 – 88,000	50,000	40,000	36,000 – 44,000	
Florence										15,000		50,000 – 60,000	80,000 – 120,000		70,000	70,000		
Gela	30,000																	
Genoa										80,000	50,000		100,000	100,000	60,000	70,000	90,000	
Ghent										5,000	10,000		60,000 – 80,000	70,000 – 80,000	80,000 – 150,000 – 175,000 – 200,000			
Gortyna	22,500																	
Granada										26,000			150,000	100,000	70,000			
Hamburg														8,000	15,000 – 20,000	40,000 – 60,000 – 100,000	63,000 – 75,000	117,000 – 130,000
Kyiv										10,000	45,000 – 50,000							19,000 - 23,000
Lisbon													35,000	50,000 – 60,000	60,000 – 70,000 – 120,000	120,000 – 140,000	200,000	237,000
London	30,000	45,000 – 50,000 – 60,000						10,000 – 12,000		20,000 – 25,000	10,000 – 20,000	20,000 – 25,000	50,000 – 100,000		50,000 – 100,000 – 120,000	225,000 – 410,000	550,000 – 700,000	861,000 – 1,000,000
Lugdunum (Lyon)	50,000 – 100,000 – 200,000	50,000 – 100,000 – 200,000						12,000		20,000					40,000 – 70,000	40,000 – 70,000	100,000	150,000
Leuven													45,000					
Lublin															40,000 – 70,000			
Lübeck												6,000	24,000	30,000 – 37,000	32,000			24,000
Madrid																60,000	105,000	182,000
Magdeburg															30,000	40,000 – 45,000		
Marseille	15,000															80,000 – 100,000	80,000	83,000 – 100,000
Mainz	15,000							20,000		30,000		25,000	24,000				20,000	20,000 – 42,000
Messina																100,000		
Milan	30,000 – 40,000		40,000	100,000								90,000	200,000	125,000	100,000	180,000	113,000	122,000 – 250,000
Metz		40,000						25,000										40,000
Montpellier													30,000 – 40,000	15,000				40,000
Moscow													20,000 – 30,000	30,000 – 40,000	100,000	200,000	200,000	270,000
Narbonne	20,000	30,000 – 50,000										31,000						
Naples	30,000							50,000		30,000		30,000	50,000 – 60,000		200,000	350,000	207,000	500,000
Nimes		40,000 – 60,000																40,000
Nuremberg												10,000	20,000	20,000	20,000 – 52,000	40,000 – 50,000 – 100,000		27,000
Ostia Antica	20,000 – 50,000 – 100,000	50,000 – 100,000																
Ohrid										40,000								
Palermo										60,000 – 350,000	150,000	150,000	50,000			100,000	124,000	135,000
Paris	8,000				30,000		20,000 – 30,000	20,000 – 30,000		20,000	50,000	110,000 – 160,000	228,000 – 275,000 – 300,000	280,000	225,000	245,000 – 420,000	515,000	546,000 – 830,000
Padua	25,000 – 40,000	25,000 – 40,000	25,000 – 40,000										40,000					
Philippi	10,000 – 100,000																	
Pliska								44,000										
Plovdiv										20,000		20,000			30,000			
Pozzuoli	30,000 – 100,000																	
Pskov														35,000	52,000 – 60,000			
Preslav									60,000	60,000								
Prague										10,000		22,000	40,000 – 77,000	95,000 – 100,000	70,000	100,000	48,000	77,000 – 100,000
Regensburg								25,000		40,000								
Reims		30,000 – 50,000																30,000
Rome	1,000,000 – 1,650,000	1,000,000	1,200,000	1,100,000	100,000	90,000	40,000 – 50,000	50,000		30,000			20,000		50,000 – 55,000	90,000 – 110,000	120,000 – 150,000	150,000
Ravenna				50,000	50,000													
Rhodes	40,000																	
Rouen								10,000			30,000		40,000	70,000	40,000 – 70,000	40,000 – 70,000	63,000	80,000 – 90,000
Saint Petersburg																	100,000+	220,000 – 425,000
Salerno										50,000	50,000	30,000			4,000			
Smolensk												20,000 – 30,000 – 40,000		25,000	50,000	64,000	40,000	
Sarai													100,00 – 600,000					
Speyer											30,000+	30,000	20,000					
Seville										90,000		150,000			25,000	100,000 – 300,000	80,000	96,000
Siena													50,000 – 120,000	25,000				
Stara Zagora	35,000									30,000		40,000			38,000			
Syracuse, Sicily	80,000 – 90,000																	
Thessaloniki	30,000 – 200,000								50,000	40,000	150,000	150,000	100,000 – 150,000	100,000 – 150,000				
Trakai														50,000				
Trnovo												48,000	35,000					
Targoviste														25,000 – 40,000	50,000 – 60,000	45,000 – 60,000		
Trier		70,000 – 80,000 – 100,000	70,000 – 80,000 – 100,000					15,000		20,000								
Toulouse	20,000	40,000	50,000									30,000	40,000	24,000	50,000		43,000	50,000
Venice										60,000		80,000	110,000 – 180,000	110,000 – 150,000	100,000 – 170,000	200,000	140,000	140,000
Verona												20,000 – 25,000	40,000					
Veliky Novgorod										10,000 – 15,000 – 18,000		20,000 – 30,000 – 40,000	50,000 – 60,000 – 400,000	50,000				
Vienna	15,000 – 20,000	15,000 – 20,000										12,000	20,000	24,000	45,000	30,000 – 50,000 – 60,000	100,000 – 113,000	250,000
Worms												28,000 – 60,000	20,000					
Ypres												40,000 – 80,000 – 200,000	40,000 – 80,000 – 200,000					
Zadar	30,000																	

== Data from Hohenberg and Lees (1985) ==
1400
City	Population
Paris	275,000
Bruges	125,000
Milan	125,000
Venice	110,000
Genoa	100,000
Granada	100,000
Prague	95,000
Ghent	70,000
Rouen	70,000
Seville	70,000

1700
City	Population
Istanbul	700,000
London	550,000
Paris	500,000
Naples	215,000
Lisbon	188,000
Amsterdam	180,000
Moscow	150,000
Venice	138,000
Rome	130,000
Milan	120,000
Belgrade	100,000
Lyon	100,000
Madrid	100,000
Vienna	100,000
Marseille	100,000
Sarajevo	100,000
Gdańsk	100,000

1800
City	Population
London	1,000,000
Paris	600,000
Naples	426,000
Moscow	250,000
Vienna	240,000
St. Petersburg	220,000
Amsterdam	220,000
Dublin	200,000
Lisbon	180,000
Berlin	172,000
Warsaw	120,000

== Data from Chandler (1987) ==
City	Country	430 B.C.	200 B.C.	A.D. 100	A.D. 361	A.D. 500	A.D. 622
Seville	Spain			37–40,000			40,000
London	United Kingdom			30,000			
Syracuse	Italy	125,000	100,000	51–60,000	45–50,000		
Rome	Italy	35,000	150,000	450,000	150,000	100,000	50,000
Milan	Italy			30,000	40,000		
Athens	Greece	155,000	75,000	75,000	50–60,000		
Corinth	Greece	70,000	70,000	50,000			
Constantinople	Turkey			36,000	300,000	400,000	350,000

City	Country	800	900	1000	1100	1150	1200	1250	1300	1350	1400	1450	1500	1550	1575	1600	1650
London	United Kingdom			15,000	25,000		40,000		45,000		50,000	60,000	50,000	74,000	112,000	187,000	410,000
Lisbon	Portugal	15,000		15,000			15,000		35,000	45,000	55,000	60,000	55,000	62,000	85,000	100,000	170,000
Córdoba	Spain	160,000	200,000	450,000	60,000	60,000	60,000		40,000		36,000		30,000			32,000	
Seville	Spain	35,000	40,000	90,000	125,000	125,000	150,000	75,000	90,000	60,000	60,000	60,000	46,000	70,000	100,000	126,000	60,000
Granada	Spain				60,000	60,000	60,000	75,000	90,000	60,000	90,000	165,000	70,000	70,000	60,000	68,000	
Madrid	Spain															80,000	125,000
Paris	France	25,000		20,000	30,000	50,000	110,000	160,000	228,000	215,000	280,000	150,000	185,000	210,000	220,000	245,000	455,000
Amsterdam	Netherlands															48,000	165,000
Rome	Italy	50,000	40,000	35,000	35,000		35,000		30,000		33,000		38,000	58,000	70,000	102,000	110,000
Turin	Italy		25,000	30,000	30,000		35,000		40,000	40,000	40,000	75,000	114,000	209,000	215,000	224,000	265,000
Milan	Italy	25,000	20,000	30,000	42,000	45,000	60,000	65,000	60,000	50,000	80,000	83,000	89,000	75,000	98,000	107,000	105,000
Palermo	Italy		35,000	75,000	90,000	125,000	150,000	75,000	35,000		25,000		39,000	60,000	70,000	105,000	132,000
Venice	Italy		35,000	45,000	55,000	60,000	70,000	90,000	110,000	85,000	110,000	100,000	115,000	171,000	157,000	151,000	134,000
Copenhagen	Denmark			15,000			22,000		30,000	40,000	55,000	76,000	80,000	84,000	90,000	110,000	
Prague	Czech Republic								25,000		35,000		35,000			33,000	
Constantinople/ Istanbul	Turkey	250,000	300,000	300,000	200,000	200,000	150,000	100,000	100,000	80,000	75,000	45,000	200,000	660,000	680,000	700,000	700,000
Smolensk	Russia							80,000	100,000	120,000							
Moscow	Russia										30,000		80,000	75,000	60,000	80,000	100,000

City	Country	1675	1700	1750	1775	1800	1825	1850	1862	1875	1900	1914	1925	1936	1950	1975
London	United Kingdom	485,000	550,000	676,000	710,000	861,000	1,335,000	2,320,000	2,803,000	4,241,000	6,480,000	7,419,000	7,742,000	9,710,000	8,860,000	10,500,000
Lisbon	Portugal	178,000	188,000	213,000	219,000	237,000	258,000	262,000	280,000	243,000	363,000	455,000	567,000		875,000	1,600,000
Córdoba	Spain		27,000			28,000		34,000			52,000					
Seville	Spain		80,000	68,000		96,000	83,000	117,000			148,000		212,000		383,000	685,000
Granada	Spain		35,000	45,000		53,000		58,000			75,000					
Madrid	Spain	115,000	105,000	110,000	132,000	182,000	201,000	216,000	303,000	373,000	539,000	623,000	791,000	1,220,000	1,527,000	4,150,000
Paris	France	540,000	530,000	556,000	600,000	547,000	855,000	1,314,000	1,800,000	2,250,000	3,330,000	4,000,000	4,800,000	5,950,000	5,900,000	9,400,000
Amsterdam	Netherlands	195,000	210,000	219,000	209,000	195,000	196,000	225,000	268,000	289,000	510,000	601,000	718,000		859,000	1,800,000
Rome	Italy	105,000	138,000	146,000	148,000	142,000	125,000	158,000	194,000	251,000	438,000	570,000	758,000	1,155,000	1,665,000	3,600,000
Naples	Italy	170,000	207,000	310,000	355,000	430,000	350,000	413,000	447,000	450,000	563,000	691,000	852,000		1,210,000	1,900,000
Milan	Italy	114,000	113,000	110,000	117,000	122,000	156,000	182,000	226,000	267,000	491,000	655,000	917,000	1,103,000	1,400,000	3,800,000
Palermo	Italy	128,000	125,000	111,000	127,000	135,000	154,000	170,000	175,000	188,000	255,000		370,000		470,000	672,000
Venice	Italy	138,000	143,000	158,000	151,000	146,000	99,000	141,000			171,000		226,000		354,000	
Berlin	Germany		26,000	113,000	136,000	172,000	222,000	446,000	582,000	1,045,000	2,707,000	3,500,000	4,013,000	4,226,000	3,707,000	2,000,000
Budapest	Hungary	-	-	-	-	-	-	-	-	309,208	733,385	880,371	960,995	1,060,431	1,629,000	2,026,543
Prague	Czech Republic		48,000	58,000		77,000	98,000	117,000			474,000	670,000	745,000		951,000	1,275,000
Copenhagen	Denmark							30,000			181,000		571,000		1,140,000	3,300,000
Istanbul	Turkey	750,000	700,000	625,000	600,000	570,000	675,000	785,000	820,000	873,000	900,000	1,125,000	817,000		1,035,000	3,200,000
Edirne	Turkey	100,000	85,000	82,000		80,000	88,000	85,000								
Moscow	Russia	105,000	114,000	146,000	177,000	248,000	257,000	373,000	346,000	600,000	1,120,000	1,805,000	1,764,000	4,050,000	5,100,000	10,700,000
Saint Petersburg	Russia			74,000	164,000	220,000	438,000	502,000	565,000	764,000	1,439,000	2,133,000	1,430,000	2,983,000	2,700,000	4,280,000

== See also ==
- Historical urban community sizes
- Largest cities in Europe
- List of cities in Europe
- List of largest cities throughout history
- List of metropolitan areas in Europe
- List of oldest continuously inhabited cities
