= List of largest cities throughout history =

This article lists the largest human settlements in the world (by population) over time, as estimated by historians, from 7000 BC when the largest human settlement was a proto-city in the ancient Near East with a population of about 1,000–2,000 people, to the year 2000 when the largest human settlement was Tokyo with 26 million.

Rome, Jiankang and Chang'an may have been the first cities to have 1,000,000 people, as early as the 1st century or as late as the 8th century. Later cities that might have reached 1 million include Luoyang, Kaifeng, Hangzhou, Beijing and Edo. There is a wide agreement that London was the first city to reach 2 million and New York was the first to reach 10 million.

The Greater Tokyo Area was the most populous metropolitan area in the world from 1955 to 2025, with more than 37.393 million residents as of 2020. Jakarta, Indonesia, overtook Tokyo in 2025, partly due to Tokyo's shrinking population.

As disagreements between the sources show, any of the pre-19th century figures are uncertain, especially in ancient times. Estimating population sizes before censuses were conducted is a difficult task.

== List of the most populous human settlements over time ==
The following table lists the most populous human settlements by estimated population at specified points in history according to three sources: Ian Morris, George Modelski and Tertius Chandler. City names are in bold where all three sources agree. It shows the evolution of the largest settlement from proto-city to city to urban area to metropolitan area.

Year	Morris (2010)			Modelski (2003)			Chandler (1987)		
Year	Population	Name	Present location	Population	Name	Present location	Population	Name	Present location
BC-7000	1,000	Beidha	Jordan	1,000–2,000	Jericho	Palestine			
BC-7000	1,000	Basta	Jordan	1,000–2,000	Jericho	Palestine			
BC-7000	1,000	Çatalhöyük	Turkey	1,000–2,000	Jericho	Palestine			
BC 6500				5,000–10,000	Çatalhöyük	Turkey			
BC 6000	3,000	Çatalhöyük	Turkey						
BC 4000	5,000	Uruk	Iraq	4,000	Eridu	Iraq			
BC 4000	5,000	Tell Brak	Syria	4,000	Eridu	Iraq			
BC 3800 to 3700				< 10,000	Dobrovody	Ukraine			
BC 3700				6,000–10,000	Eridu	Iraq			
BC 3600 to 3500				< 10,000	Maydanets	Ukraine			
BC 3600 to 3500				< 10,000	Talianki	Ukraine			
BC 3500				14,000	Uruk	Iraq			
BC 3300				40,000	Uruk	Iraq			
BC 3200							20,000	Abydos	Egypt
BC 3100							20,000	Memphis	Egypt
BC 3000	45,000	Uruk	Iraq	40,000	Uruk	Iraq	30,000	Memphis	Egypt
BC 2800				80,000	Uruk	Iraq		Memphis	Egypt
BC 2500				60,000	Lagash	Iraq		Memphis	Egypt
BC 2500				20,000	Nippur	Iraq		Memphis	Egypt
BC 2400				50,000	Mari	Syria		Memphis	Egypt
BC 2400				40,000	Umma	Iraq		Memphis	Egypt
BC 2400				40,000	Girsu	Iraq		Memphis	Egypt
BC 2400				40,000	Mohenjo-daro	Pakistan		Memphis	Egypt
BC 2300				80,000	Girsu	Iraq		Memphis	Egypt
BC 2300				50,000	Mari	Syria		Memphis	Egypt
BC 2250							> 30,000	Memphis	Egypt
BC 2240								Akkad	Iraq
BC 2200				50,000	Girsu	Iraq		Akkad	Iraq
BC 2100				100,000	Ur	Iraq		Akkad	Iraq
BC 2075							50,000	Girsu	Iraq
BC 2059								Girsu	Iraq
BC 2030								Ur	Iraq
BC 2000	60,000	Memphis	Egypt	40,000	Isin	Iraq	65,000	Ur	Iraq
BC 2000	60,000	Memphis	Egypt	40,000	Larsa	Iraq	65,000	Ur	Iraq
BC 2000	60,000	Memphis	Egypt	40,000	Girsu	Iraq	65,000	Ur	Iraq
BC 1991								Ur	Iraq
BC 1980								Thebes	Egypt
BC 1900				40,000	Isin	Iraq		Thebes	Egypt
BC 1900				40,000	Larsa	Iraq		Thebes	Egypt
BC 1800				60,000	Mari	Syria	> 25,000	Thebes	Egypt
BC 1770							60,000	Babylon	Iraq
BC 1700				60,000	Babylon	Iraq		Babylon	Iraq
BC 1670								Avaris	Egypt
BC 1650							100,000	Avaris	Egypt
BC 1600				50,000–100,000	Avaris	Egypt	100,000	Avaris	Egypt
BC 1595								Avaris	Egypt
BC 1580								Avaris	Egypt
BC 1557								Memphis	Egypt
BC 1500	75,000	Uruk	Iraq	60,000	Thebes	Egypt		Memphis	Egypt
BC 1500	75,000	Thebes	Egypt	60,000	Thebes	Egypt		Memphis	Egypt
BC 1400				80,000	**Thebes**	Egypt		**Thebes**	Egypt
BC 1375							100,000	Thebes	Egypt
BC 1360							80,000	Thebes	Egypt
BC 1350								Thebes	Egypt
BC 1300				-	Yinxu (Anyang)	China		Thebes	Egypt
BC 1205								Memphis	Egypt
BC 1200	80,000	Babylon	Iraq	160,000	Pi-Ramses	Egypt	50,000	Memphis	Egypt
BC 1200	80,000	Thebes	Egypt	160,000	Pi-Ramses	Egypt	50,000	Memphis	Egypt
BC 1188								Thebes	Egypt
BC 1184							120,000	Thebes	Egypt
BC 1100				120,000	Pi-Ramses	Egypt		Thebes	Egypt
BC 1000	35,000	Qiyi (Qi)	China	120,000	Thebes	Egypt	> 50,000	Thebes	Egypt
BC 1000	35,000	Qiyi (Qi)	China	100,000	Haojing (Xi'an)	China	> 50,000	Haojing (Xi'an)	China
BC 1000	35,000	Qiyi (Qi)	China	100,000	Memphis	Egypt	50,000	Chengzhou (Luoyang)	China
BC 1000	35,000	Qiyi (Qi)	China	100,000	Babylon	Iraq	100,000	Chengzhou (Luoyang)	China
BC 900				120,000	Haojing	China		Thebes	Egypt
BC 800	75,000	Nimrud/Kalhu	Iraq	125,000	Haojing	China	> 50,000	Thebes	Egypt
BC 700				100,000	Thebes	Egypt		Thebes	Egypt
BC 700				100,000	Memphis	Egypt		Thebes	Egypt
BC 700				100,000	Nineveh	Iraq		Thebes	Egypt
BC 700				100,000	Babylon	Iraq		Thebes	Egypt
BC 700				100,000	Luoyi (Luoyang)	China		Thebes	Egypt
BC 700				100,000	Linzi	China		Thebes	Egypt
BC 668							100,000	Nineveh	Iraq
BC 650							120,000	Nineveh	Iraq
BC 612								Babylon	Iraq
BC 600				200,000	**Babylon**	Iraq	100,000	**Babylon**	Iraq
BC 600				200,000	Luoyi	China	100,000	**Babylon**	Iraq
BC 562							200,000	Babylon	Iraq
BC 500	150,000	**Babylon**	Iraq	200,000	**Babylon**	Iraq		**Babylon**	Iraq
BC 500	150,000	**Babylon**	Iraq	200,000	Luoyi	China		**Babylon**	Iraq
BC 500	150,000	**Babylon**	Iraq	200,000	Linzi	China		**Babylon**	Iraq
BC 479								Babylon	Iraq
BC 460								Babylon	Iraq
BC 440								Babylon	Iraq
BC 430							200,000	Babylon	Iraq
BC 400				320,000	Xiadu	China		Babylon	Iraq
BC 320							> 300,000	Alexandria	Egypt
BC 300				500,000	Carthage	Tunisia		Pataliputra (Patna)	India
BC 220								Pataliputra	India
BC 206								Pataliputra	India
BC 200	300,000	Alexandria	Egypt	600,000	Alexandria	Egypt	350,000	Pataliputra	India
BC 200	300,000	Alexandria	Egypt	600,000	Alexandria	Egypt	400,000	Chang'an (Xi'an)	China
BC 195								Chang'an	China
BC 190								Chang'an	China
BC 170								Chang'an	China
BC 160								Chang'an	China
BC 100				1,000,000	Alexandria	Egypt		Chang'an	China
BC 25								Rome	Italy
AD 1	1,000,000	**Rome**	Italy	800,000	**Rome**	Italy		**Rome**	Italy
AD 100				1,000,000	**Rome**	Italy	450,000	**Rome**	Italy
180							600,000	Rome	Italy
200	800,000	**Rome**	Italy	1,200,000	**Rome**	Italy		**Rome**	Italy
280							500,000	Rome	Italy
300				1,000,000	**Rome**	Italy		**Rome**	Italy
340								Constantinople	Turkey
350								Constantinople	Turkey
361							300,000	Constantinople	Turkey
400	500,000	Rome	Italy	800,000	Rome	Italy		Constantinople	Turkey
410								Constantinople	Turkey
450								Constantinople	Turkey
500				500,000	**Constantinople**	Turkey	400,000	**Constantinople**	Turkey
500				500,000	Jiankang (Nanjing)	China	400,000	**Constantinople**	Turkey
500				500,000	Luoyang	China	400,000	**Constantinople**	Turkey
570								Ctesiphon	Iraq
575							500,000	Ctesiphon	Iraq
600	600,000	Daxing (Chang'an)	China	600,000	Constantinople	Turkey	500,000	Ctesiphon	Iraq
622							500,000	Ctesiphon	Iraq
637							400,000	Chang'an	China
650								Chang'an	China
700				1,000,000	**Chang'an**	China	800,000	**Chang'an**	China
750							800,000	Chang'an	China
775							600,000	Baghdad	Iraq
800	1,000,000	Chang'an	China	800,000	Chang'an	China	700,000	Baghdad	Iraq
833							900,000	Baghdad	Iraq
900	750,000	Chang'an	China	900,000	Baghdad	Iraq	900,000	Baghdad	Iraq
925							1,100,000	Baghdad	Iraq
932							1,100,000	Baghdad	Iraq
935							350,000	Cordoba	Spain
1000	1,000,000	Kaifeng	China	1,200,000	Baghdad	Iraq	350,000	Cordoba	Spain
1013							400,000	Kaifeng	China
1050							400,000	Kaifeng	China
1071							400,000	Kaifeng	China
1100				1,200,000	Baghdad	Iraq	442,000	Kaifeng	China
1102							442,000	Kaifeng	China
1126							420,000	Kaifeng	China
1127							200,000	Constantinople	Turkey
1145							200,000	Merv	Turkmenistan
1150							200,000	Merv	Turkmenistan
1153							200,000	Constantinople	Turkey
1160							200,000	Constantinople	Turkey
1170							200,000	Fez	Morocco
1180							200,000	Hangzhou	China
1200	1,000,000	**Hangzhou**	China	1,000,000	Baghdad	Iraq	255,000	**Hangzhou**	China
1200	1,000,000	**Hangzhou**	China	1,000,000	**Hangzhou**	China	255,000	**Hangzhou**	China
1200	1,000,000	**Hangzhou**	China	1,000,000	Kaifeng	China	255,000	**Hangzhou**	China
1210							260,000	Hangzhou	China
1250							320,000	Hangzhou	China
1273							432,000	Hangzhou	China
1300				1,500,000	**Hangzhou**	China	432,000	**Hangzhou**	China
1315							432,000	Cairo	Egypt
1325							500,000	Cairo	Egypt
1348							432,000	Hangzhou	China
1350							432,000	Hangzhou	China
1358								Jiankang (Nanjing)	China
1391							473,000	Yingtian (Nanjing)	China
1400	500,000	**Yingtian** (Nanjing)	China	1,000,000	**Yingtian** (Nanjing)	China	487,000	**Yingtian**	China
1420								Yingtian	China
1425								Beijing	China
1450							600,000	Beijing	China
1492							669,000	Beijing	China
1500	600,000	**Beijing**	China	1,000,000	**Beijing**	China	672,000	**Beijing**	China
1550							690,000	Beijing	China
1575							706,000	Beijing	China
1579							706,000	Beijing	China
1600	700,000	**Beijing**	China	1,000,000	**Beijing**	China	706,000	**Beijing**	China
1635								Beijing	China
1637								Beijing	China
1650							700,000	Constantinople	Turkey
1670								Constantinople	Turkey
1675							750,000	Constantinople	Turkey
1684								Constantinople	Turkey
1685								Constantinople	Turkey
1690							700–800,000	Constantinople	Turkey
1700	650,000	Beijing	China	1,000,000	Ayutthaya	Thailand	700,000	Constantinople	Turkey
1710								Beijing	China
1720		Edo	Japan					Beijing	China
1750							900,000	Beijing	China
1775							1,000,000	Beijing	China
1800	1,100,000	**Beijing**	China	1,100,000	**Beijing**	China	1,100,000	**Beijing**	China
1821							1,300,000	Beijing	China
1825							1,350,000	Beijing	China
1825							1,335,000	London (urban area)	United Kingdom
1841							1,948,000	London	United Kingdom
1850							2,320,000	London	United Kingdom
1851							2,362,000	London	United Kingdom
1861							2,803,000	London	United Kingdom
1875							4,241,000	London	United Kingdom
1900	6,600,000	**London**	United Kingdom	6,500,000	**London**	United Kingdom	6,480,000	**London**	United Kingdom
1914							7,419,000	London	United Kingdom
1925							7,774,000	New York (urban area)	United States
1936							10,150,000	New York	United States
1950							12,463,000	New York	United States
1965							15,000,000	Tokyo (urban area)	Japan
1975							20,500,000	Tokyo	Japan
2000	26,400,000	Tokyo	Japan						

== See also ==
- Historical urban community sizes, 7000 BC – 2000
- List of largest European cities in history
- List of largest cities, present day
- Estimates of historical world population
- Valeriepieris circle
