= Kuzma Derevyanko =

Soviet lieutenant general (1904–1954)

Hero of Ukraine Kuzma Nikolayevich Derevyanko
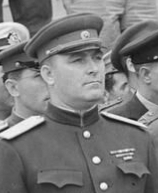
- Kuzma Derevyanko, 2 September 1945
- Born: November 14, 1904; Kosenivka, Russian Empire
- Died: September 5, 1954 (aged 49); Moscow, Russian SFSR, Soviet Union
- Burial place: Novodevichy Cemetery
- Military career
- Allegiance: Soviet Union (1922–1959)
- Branch: Red Army; Soviet Ground Forces
- Service years: 1922–1954
- Rank: Lieutenant General
- Unit: 53rd Army
- Conflicts: Spanish Civil War; World War II; Winter War; Leningrad Front; Eastern Front; Battle of Kursk; Vienna offensive; Battle of the Dnieper; Battle of Korsun–Cherkassy; Occupation of Japan
- Awards: Hero of Ukraine; Order of Lenin; Order of the Red Banner; Order of Kutuzov; Order of Suvorov; Order of Bogdan Khmelnitsky; Order of the Red Star; Medal "For the Victory over Germany in the Great Patriotic War 1941–1945"

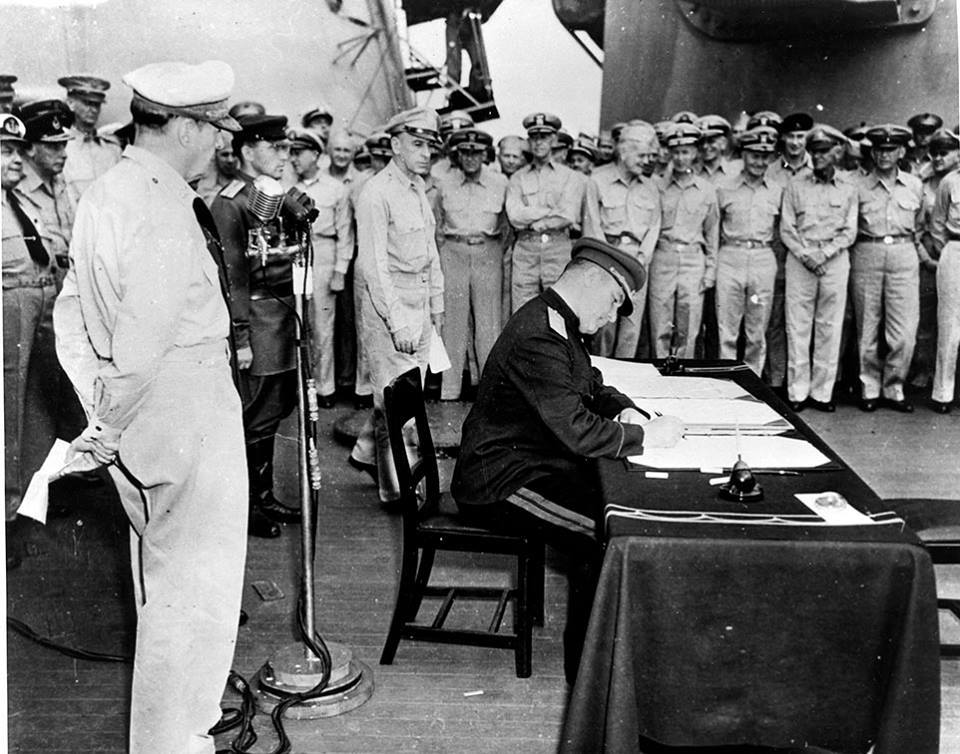
In a short event which officially ended the Pacific War, Lieutenant-General Derevyanko representing the Soviet Union signs the instrument of surrender aboard USS Missouri.

Kuzma Nikolayevich Derevyanko (Russian: Кузьма́ Никола́евич Деревя́нко, Ukrainian: Кузьма Миколайович Дерев'янко, Kuzma Mykolaiovych Derevianko; November 14 (O.S. 1), 1904 – December 30, 1954) was a Soviet Lieutenant General in the Soviet Army.

== Life ==
Derevyanko was born on November 14, 1904, in the village of Kosenivka, Umansky Uyezd, Kiev Governorate, Russian Empire (now Ukraine). Growing up in the Vologda region until the age of nine, Derevyanko got an education in a parochial school and partial attendance at a gymnasium.

In 1922, Derevyanko embarked on a military career, enrolling in the Red Army. Graduating from the Second Kyiv School of Red Stars in 1924, he later developed a keen interest in the Japanese language during his time at the Kharkov School of Military Sergeants. By the time he completed his studies, he was proficient in both spoken and written Japanese. Serving in the 297th Infantry Regiment from September 1924, Derevyanko swiftly rose through the ranks, eventually commanding a company by October 1926.

His dedication and linguistic skills led him to assume roles of increasing responsibility, including heading the military office in the Uman Garrison House of the Red Army from November 1929 and later serving as assistant to the chief of the 2nd department of the headquarters of the Ukrainian Military District from December 1931.

In pursuit of further education, Derevyanko joined the Eastern Faculty of the Military Academy of the Red Army in 1933, specializing in English and Japanese studies. Graduating in 1936, he transitioned to the Intelligence Department of the Red Army, where he undertook crucial missions, including a significant involvement in the Spanish Civil War in 1937. During the Soviet-Finnish War of 1939–1940, Derevyanko served as the chief of staff of the Separate Special Ski Brigade, a reconnaissance and sabotage unit composed mainly of students from the Leningrad Institute of Physical Education. in July 1940, he assumed the position of deputy head of the intelligence department of the Baltic Special Military District. His pre-war activities culminated in a special assignment in East Prussia from January to March 1941, further showcasing his versatility and commitment to service.

== World War II ==
Derevyanko from the onset of the war, served as the deputy head of the intelligence department of the North-Western Front's headquarters. By June 29, 1941, he assumed the acting headship of this department. From May 1942, Derevyanko took charge as the chief of staff of the 53rd Army of the North-Western Front, later transitioning to the Steppe Front in July 1943. His wartime journey continued with significant appointments, including chief of staff of the 57th Army on the 2nd and 3rd Ukrainian Fronts from December 1943, and later as chief of staff of the 4th Guards Army on the same fronts from June 1944. Following the war's conclusion in Europe, Derevyanko assumed the responsibility of representing the USSR in the Allied Commission for a period.

=== Surrender of Japan ===
Derevyanko (at the time Chief of Staff of the 35th Army) was the representative of the Soviet Union at the ceremonial signing of the written agreement that established the armistice ending the Pacific War and with it World War II. The Soviet delegation joined other Allied representatives on the battleship USS Missouri which was anchored in Tokyo Bay. Together, the waiting Allies silently acknowledged the representatives of the Japanese Emperor and the representative of the Imperial Japanese Army, who were the last to arrive. The proceedings began when General MacArthur stepped before a single microphone. The 23-minute surrender ceremony was broadcast worldwide. Derevyanko signed the Japanese Instrument of Surrender at precisely 9:17 a.m. in Tokyo Bay on September 2, 1945. He served as Soviet representative at MacArthur's headquarters during the US occupation of Japan.

== Later life ==
Following the surrender, Derevyanko undertook several visits to the atomic-bombed cities of Hiroshima and Nagasaki, compiling detailed reports and photographic evidence of the devastation.

Appointed as the USSR's representative in the Allied Council for Japan, Derevyanko advocated Soviet interests in the governance of occupied Japan, particularly opposing American proposals for agrarian reform. His tenure in this capacity ceased with the dissolution of the council in 1951 due to disagreements over the San Francisco Peace Treaty.

Returning to Moscow in August 1950, Derevyanko assumed roles within the Frunze Military Academy and later within the GRU. He died of cancer on December 30, 1954, and was buried on January 3, 1955, at Novodevichy Cemetery. In 2007, he was posthumously awarded the title of Hero of Ukraine.

== Awards ==
He was awarded:

- Hero of Ukraine (2008)
- Two Orders of Lenin
- Two Orders of the Red Banner
- Order of Suvorov 1st class
- Order of Kutuzov 1st class
- Order of Bogdan Khmelnitsky
- Order of the Red Star
- Medal "For the Victory over Germany in the Great Patriotic War 1941–1945"
- Medal "For the Victory over Japan"
- Medal "For the Capture of Budapest"
- Medal "For the Capture of Vienna"
- Jubilee Medal "XX Years of the Workers' and Peasants' Red Army"
- Jubilee Medal "30 Years of the Soviet Army and Navy"
