= Dmytrushky rural hromada =

Coordinates: 48°45′N 30°20′E

Dmytrushky rural hromada Дмитрушківська сільська громада
- Hromada
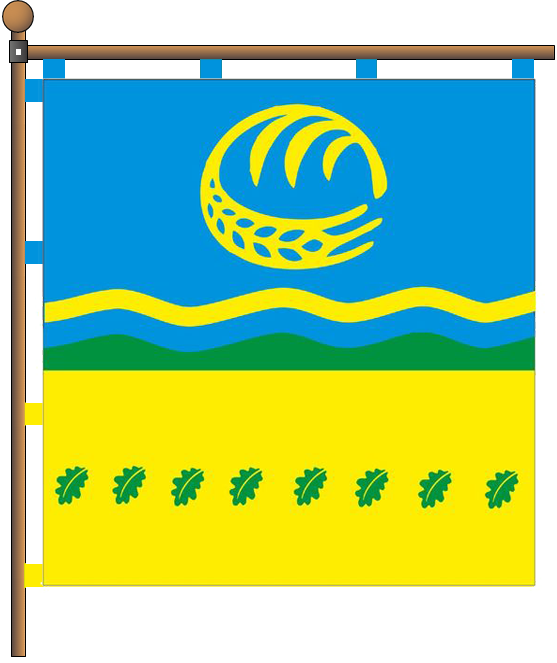
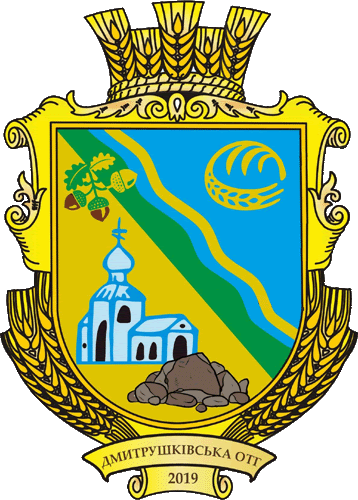
- Flag Seal
- Interactive map of Dmytrushky rural hromada
- Country: Ukraine
- Oblast: Cherkasy
- Raion: Uman

Area
  - Total: 311.4 km^{2} (120.2 sq mi)

Population
  - Total: 9,535
  - Density: 30.62/km^{2} (79.30/sq mi)
- Settlements: 12
- Villages: 12
- Website: dmytrushkivska-gromada.gov.ua

Dmytrushky rural hromada is a hromada in the Uman Raion of Cherkasy Oblast of Ukraine. Its administrative centre is the village of Dmytrushky.

== Composition ==
The hromada consists of 12 villages:

- Herezhenivka
- Hrozdeve
- Dmytrushky (administrative centre)
- Dobrovody
- Zayachkivka
- Kosenivka
- Puhachivka
- Sobkivka
- Stari Babany
- Stepkivka
- Sushkivka
- Tanske
