= Trinca (Chalcolithic settlement) =

Prehistoric settlement site

Coordinates: 48°12′05″N 27°06′20″E

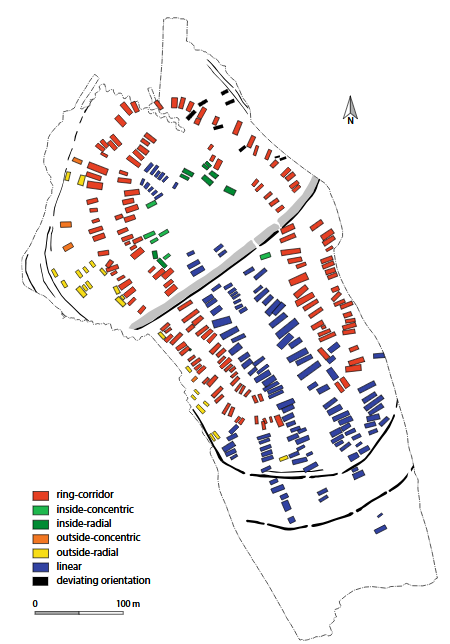
The chronological phases of the settlement Trinca

The Trypillia hilltop settlement of Trinca-La Șanț, northern Moldova, is a 25-ha large fortified settlement dating to 3950 to 3650BCE. Of the 320 houses, up to 100 existed simultaneously. This corresponds to a maximum number of inhabitants of 250–1000 people, what makes it to be a town-like settlement.

== Location and research history ==
The site Trinca-La Șanț is located on the northern Moldovan plateau, which differs geologically from other areas of the Trypillia distribution due to its Sarmatian limestone formations and coral as well as seabed deposit.

It was discovered in 1990 during the investigations of an Iron Age necropolis approximately 1 km southwards. The good visibility of the ditch and rampart made the researchers believe that the site was an Iron Age fortification related to the necropolis.

The first excavations in 1990, 1999 showed that the site is associated to the Cucuteni-Trypillia complex. Since 2016 the site was investigated by scientists from Kiel University (Collaborative Research Centre 1266) in collaboration with scientists from the State University of Moldova. Archaeomagnetic prospection were carried out in 2016 and 2022 and a few structures (houses and one cross-section of each of the two ditches) of the site were excavated in 2022, 2023, and 2024.

== Settlement ==
Archaeomagnetic surveys of the site have identified numerous structural features, including residential houses, ditches, and palisades. The southern boundary of the settlement is defined by a system of ditches and palisades, which includes five apparent passageways. Approximately 70 meters further north, a second ditch and palisade system is present. This northern system appears to connect with additional ditch structures to the north, collectively forming a rounded, long-oval enclosure.

The settlement contains rows of houses aligned in an east–west orientation, with gables positioned parallel to the orientation of the rows. These rows extend toward the southern trench, with at least five linear, north–south-oriented rows of houses spaced at an average distance of 25 meters. Two additional rows, also aligned with their gables parallel, curve in the southern and northern areas of the settlement. These curved rows resemble the concentric house arrangements characteristic of other known Trypillia culture settlements.

In the northern part of the settlement, an open space has been observed in the central area. This space may represent a deliberate design feature, although it is also possible that erosion or destruction caused by a military camp resulted in its formation. The rounded house rows are primarily located within the center of the second ditch system, though other house orientations are present in certain areas, such as the westernmost part of the settlement.

== Chronology and abandonment ==
The construction of Ditch 1, marking the boundary of the 25-hectare settlement, dates to the mid-40th century BCE. This ditch served to demarcate the settlement area from the surrounding promontory. By the 39th century BCE, evidence suggests the construction of two houses, coinciding with a gradual decline in the functional importance of Ditch 1. Radiometric data indicate the presence of four houses during the 38th century BCE and a single house in the 37th century BCE. The settlement was ultimately abandoned by 3600 BCE at the latest.

== Meaning ==
The population of Trinca-La Șanț likely did not exceed 1,000 inhabitants, and the settlement was consistently enclosed by a labor-intensive ditch system. The outer ditch, featuring four entry points and apparently constructed prior to the settlement itself, bears similarities to the causewayed enclosures identified at other C1 Trypillia sites. This feature emphasizes the significance of delineating and protecting the settlement space within the cultural and environmental context of the Trypillia civilization.

The radiocarbon dating indicates that the settlement at Trinca-La Șanț was established contemporaneously with other large settlements in Moldova, such as Stolniceni and Petreni, as well as the mega-sites in the central Ukrainian Sinyukha Basin. This suggests that there was no chronological distinction between lowland and hilltop settlements. Consequently, the originally proposed hypothesis that turbulent periods influenced the selection of Trinca-La Șanț as a settlement site no longer holds validity.

Additionally, the data available to date does not support a chronological differentiation between linear and concentric settlement principles. Instead, Trinca-La Șanț appears to represent a hybrid settlement model that integrates both principles, adapted to the specific topographical features of the promontory on which it was located.

Moreover, the subsistence strategy at Trinca-La Șanț mirrored those of other contemporaneous large settlements. This included a reliance on animal husbandry—primarily for fertilization—and the cultivation of protein-rich crops. Isotopic analyses further corroborate similarities with other Trypillia C1-phase settlements in the region.
