= Talianky =

Village in Cherkasy Oblast, Ukraine

Talianky Тальянки
- Village
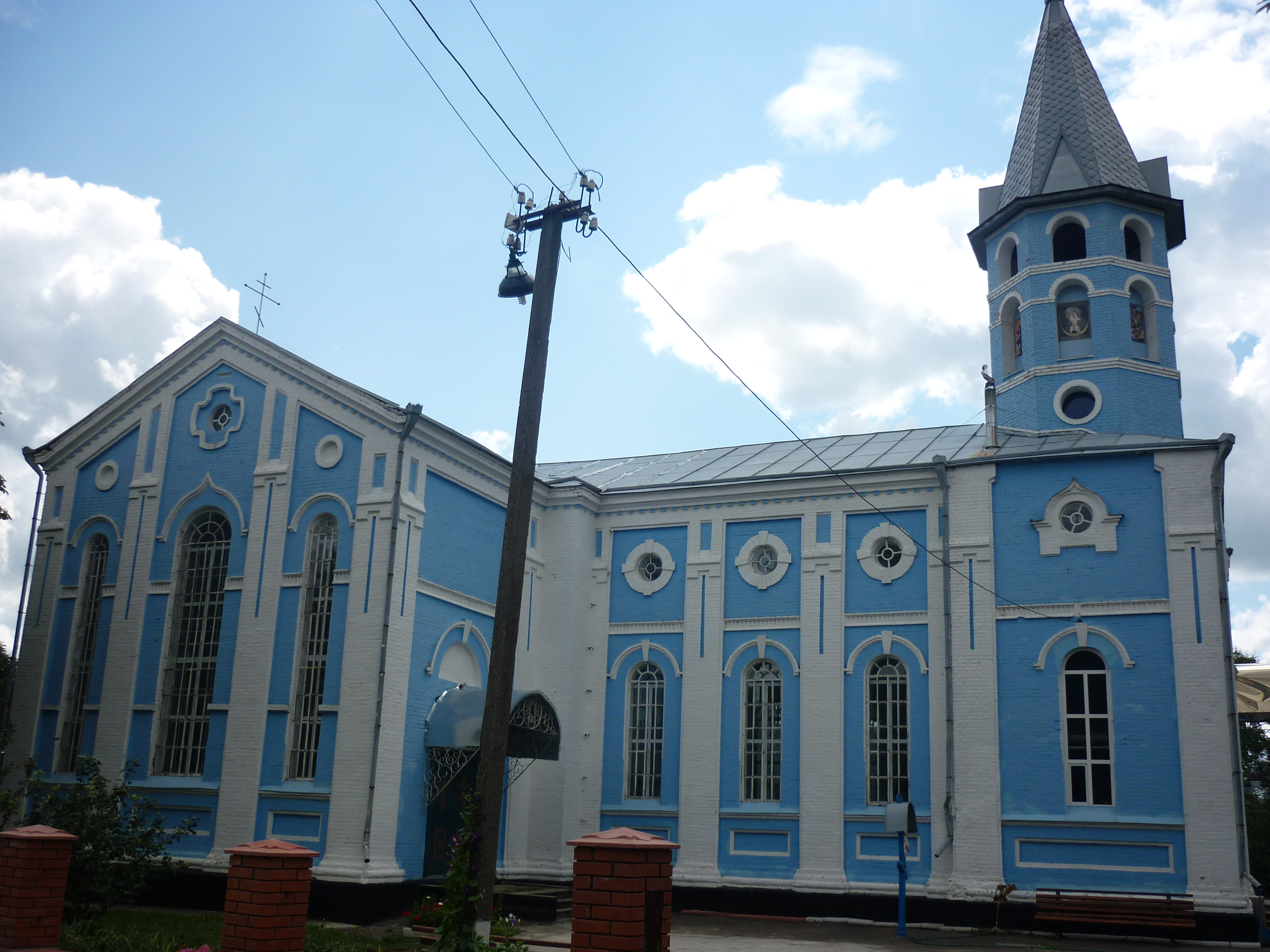
- Church of The Holy Intercession
- Interactive map of Talianky
- Location of Talianky in Cherkasy Oblast Talianky (Ukraine)
- Coordinates: 48°48′30″N 30°32′54″E
- Country: Ukraine
- Oblast: Cherkasy Oblast
- Raion: Zvenyhorodka Raion
- Hromada: Talne urban hromada

Government
- Elevation: 181 m (594 ft)

Population 1720 voters
  - Total: 1,720
- Time zone: UTC+2 (EET)
  - Summer (DST): UTC+3 (EEST)
- Postal code: 20434
- Area code: +380 4731
- ISO 3166 code: UA-26
- KOATUU: 7124089301

Talianky (Ukrainian: Тальянки, also spelled Tallianki, Tal'anky, Tal'ianky or Tal'ianki) is a village in Cherkasy Oblast, Ukraine, close to the city of Talne and about 237 kilometers (147 mi) south of Kyiv. It is in Talne urban hromada, one of the hromadas of Ukraine.

It is a small farming community located among large open fields that cover the plateau above the nearby Talianky River that winds its way through this area in a narrow riverine valley.

Until 18 July 2020, Talianky belonged to Talne Raion. The raion was abolished in July 2020 as part of the administrative reform of Ukraine, which reduced the number of raions of Cherkasy Oblast to four. The area of Talne Raion was merged into Zvenyhorodka Raion.

The remains of a prehistoric settlement near the village, belonging to the Cucuteni–Trypillia culture, are the largest known in Europe during the Neolithic period.
