= Talianki (archaeological site) =

Archaeological site in Ukraine

Coordinates: 48°48′18″N 30°32′06″E

Talianki or Talianky (Ukrainian: Тальянки) is an archaeological site near the village of the same name in Cherkasy Oblast, Ukraine. It was the location of a large Cucuteni–Trypillian settlement dating to around 3850–3700 BC, currently the largest known settlement in Neolithic Europe. The settlement, built on a bluff between the Talianka River and a smaller stream, was made up of ovular, concentric rows of interconnected buildings. Built on top of the older Cucuteni-Trypillian settlement are the remains of some Yamnaya culture tumuli (burial mounds) dating to the middle of the 3rd millennium BC, as well as some graves from the late Bronze Age.

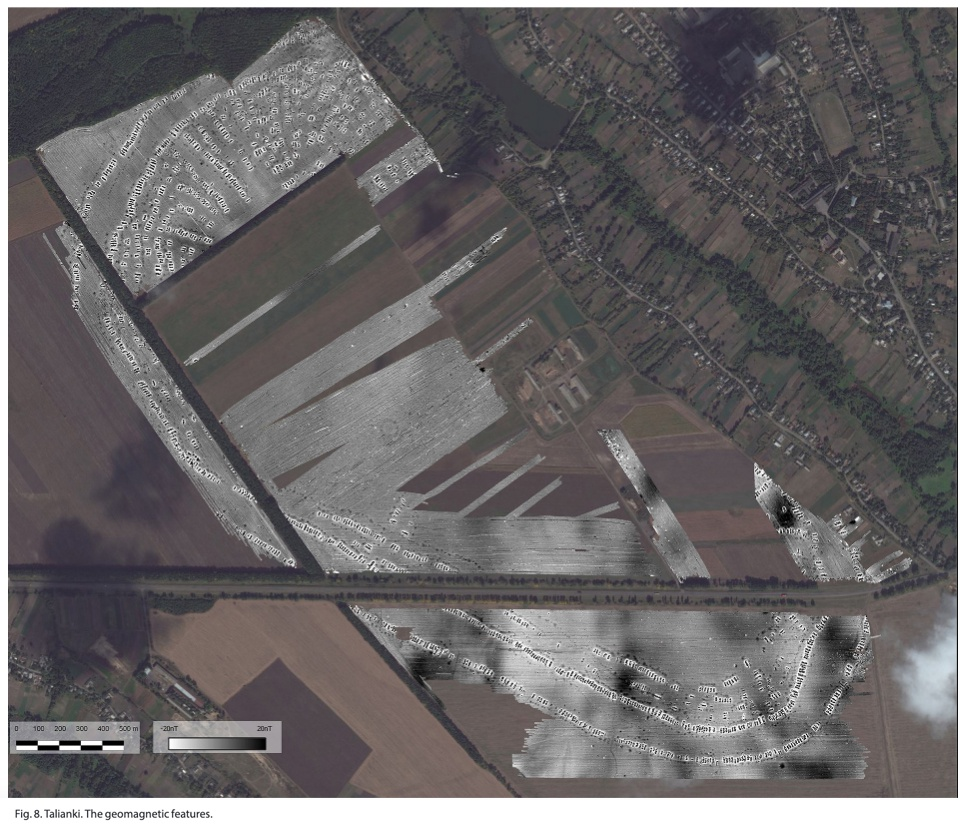
Talianki geomagnetic ground plan

Talianki was discovered in an infrared aerial photography survey carried out in the 1970s by a Ukrainian pilot in his spare time. Excavations at the site began in 1981, directed by Vladimir Kruts. Further excavations were carried out by Kruts up to 2001. Many of the buildings that were excavated had two storeys. The walls and ceilings of the structures were decorated with red and black designs, reminiscent of designs painted on Cucuteni-Trypillian pottery, which, along with ceramic figurines, were also found at the site. Finds from these excavations are exhibited in the Cherkasy Regional Museum, the Museum of Agriculture in Talne, and the Institute of Archaeology in Kyiv.

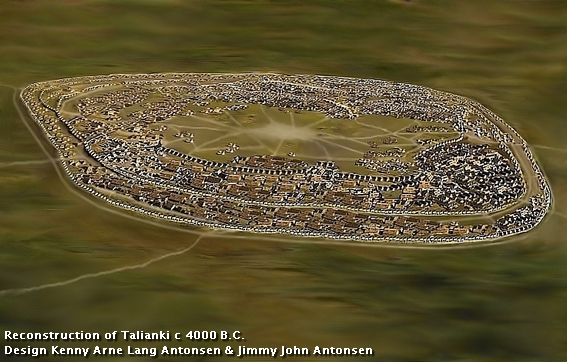
Reconstruction of Talianki, a Trypillian mega-site.

Kruts estimated the total area of the settlement at 450 hectares (1,100 acres), on the assumption that it had a rectangular plan. Extrapolating from this and the density of houses in the surveyed portions of the site, M. Videiko estimated that Talianki contained approximately 2,700 structures and, at its height, could have been occupied by over 15,000 inhabitants. Recently Kruts' figure has been revised by Thomas K. Harper, who used a geomagnetic plan of the site to put its area at 335 hectares (830 acres). This implies Videiko's figure for the peak population of the site is also an overestimation, with Harper suggesting 6,300–11,000 as a more likely range, favouring the lower end. But other estimates are much larger with a population of around 15,000 as the most cited, and adding the numbers for the satellite towns the total population were up to 25,000–30,000 people within its cluster. Research in 2014 indicates that Talianki contained between 15,600 and 21,000 people.

== See also ==
- Maidanets
- Dobrovody
- Nebelivka
