= Anatoly Kasheida =

Ukrainian writer (1928–1998)

- Born: Anatoly Fedorovich Kasheida; 14 August 1928; Talne, Ukrainian SSR, Soviet Union
- Died: 19 June 1998 (aged 69); Uman, Ukraine
- Education: M. V. Frunze Higher Naval School; Maxim Gorky Literature Institute
- Occupations: Novelist; poet; journalist
- Writing career
- Years active: 1959–1998

Anatoly Fedorovich Kasheida (Kosheida) (Russian: Анатолий Фёдорович Кашеида (Кошеида); 14 August 1928 – 19 June 1998) was a Soviet writer, poet, journalist of Ukrainian descent.

== Early life and education ==
Kasheida was born on 14 August 1928 in Talne, which was then part of the Ukrainian SSR in the Soviet Union (now Ukraine).

In 1947 he graduated from the Baku naval preparatory school, then studied at the M. V. Frunze Higher Naval School. In 1958, was dismissed in stock. Then he studied at the Gorky Literary Institute in Moscow.

== Career ==
He worked in the press agency Novosti.

== Death ==
He died on 19 June 1998 in Uman, Ukraine.

== Bibliography ==
- "I Love"
- "Matrosskaya Sea"
- "Is miles lag"
- "A swan white and black swan - friends"
- "Africa was called"
- "Continent"
- "Hard Bank"
