= Talne Raion =

Former subdivision of Cherkasy Oblast, Ukraine

Talne Raion Тальнівський район
- Raion
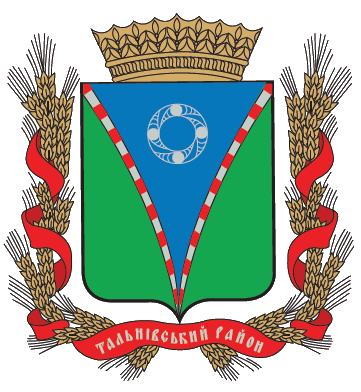
- Flag Coat of arms

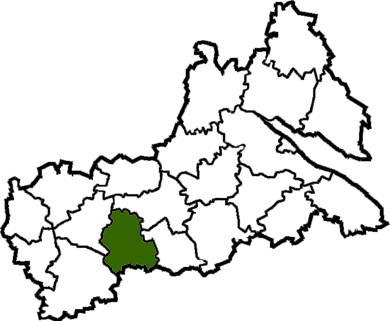
- Raion location in Cherkasy Oblast
- Coordinates: 48°53′14.2″N 30°40′47″E
- Country: Ukraine
- Oblast: Cherkasy Oblast
- Disestablished: 18 July 2020
- Admin. center: Talne

Population (2020)
  - Total: 31,874
- Time zone: UTC+2 (EET)
  - Summer (DST): UTC+3 (EEST)

Talne Raion (Ukrainian: Тальнівський район) was a raion (district) of Cherkasy Oblast, central Ukraine. Its administrative centre was located at the town of Talne. The raion was abolished on 18 July 2020 as part of the administrative reform of Ukraine, which reduced the number of raions of Cherkasy Oblast to four. The area of Talne Raion was merged into Zvenyhorodka Raion. The last estimate of the raion population was 31,874 (2020 est.)

At the time of disestablishment, the raion consisted of one hromada, Talne urban hromada with the administration in Talne.
