= Burned house horizon =

Phenomenon of presumably intentionally burned settlements

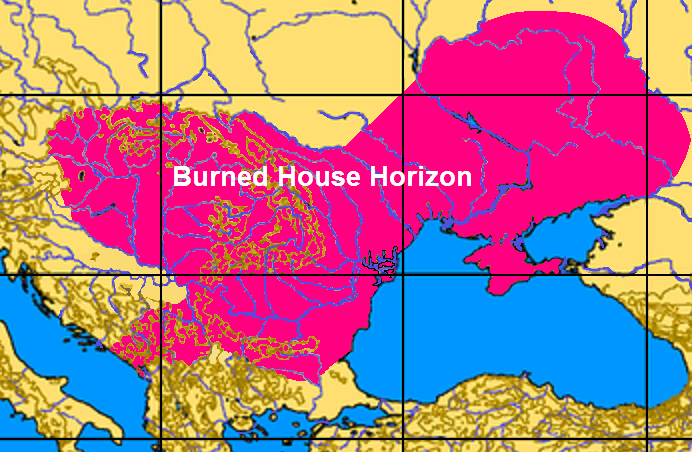
A map showing the extent of the Burned House practice in Southeastern Europe, based on Tringham.

In the archaeology of Neolithic Europe, the burned house horizon is the geographical extent of the phenomenon of presumably intentionally burned settlements.

This was a widespread and long-lasting tradition in what are now Southeastern Europe and Eastern Europe, lasting from as early as 6500 BCE (the beginning of the Neolithic in that region) to as late as 2000 BCE (the end of the Chalcolithic and the beginning of the Bronze Age). A notable representative of this tradition is the Cucuteni-Trypillian culture, which was centered on the burned-house horizon both geographically and temporally.

There is still a discussion in the study of Neolithic and Eneolithic Europe whether the majority of burned houses were intentionally set alight or not.

Although there is still debate about why the house burning was practiced, the evidence seems to indicate that it was highly unlikely to have been accidental. There is also debate about why this would have been done deliberately and regularly, since these burnings could destroy the entire settlement. However, in recent years, the consensus has begun to gel around the "domicide" theory supported by Tringham, Stevanovic and others. Recent studies in paleogenetics from ancient mass burial sites of possible victims of epidemic disease, showing no visible signs of trauma, have yielded DNA of Yersinia pestis (the plague). It is possible that survivors of recurring plague events discovered the technique of high intensity fire destruction of all buildings in a community (domicide) would halt the spread of plague by sterilizing the bacteria, carriers and hosts. This would strongly support the domicide theory of Tringham, Stevanovic and others.

Cucuteni-Trypillian settlements were completely burned every 75–80 years, leaving behind successive layers consisting mostly of large amounts of rubble from the collapsed wattle-and-daub walls. This rubble was mostly ceramic material that had been created as the raw clay used in the daub of the walls became vitrified from the intense heat that would have turned it a bright orange color during the conflagration that destroyed the buildings, much the same way that raw clay objects are turned into ceramic products during the firing process in a kiln. Moreover, the sheer amount of fired-clay rubble found within every house of a settlement indicates that a fire of enormous intensity would have raged through the entire community to have created the volume of material found.

== Evidence ==
Although there have been some attempts to try to replicate the results of these ancient settlement burnings, no modern experiment has yet managed to successfully reproduce the conditions that would leave behind the type of evidence that is found in these burned Neolithic sites, had the structures burned under normal conditions.

There has also been a debate between scholars whether these settlements were burned accidentally or intentionally.

Whether the houses were set on fire in a ritualistic way all together before abandoning the settlement, or each house was destroyed at the end of its life (e.g. before building a new one) it is still a matter of debate.

The first theory, holding that the burning of the settlements was due to reasons resulting from accident or warfare, originated in the 1940s, and referred only to some of the Cucuteni-Trypillian sites located in Moldova and Ukraine. The second theory that holds that the settlements were burned deliberately is more recent, and broadens the focus to include the entire region of the culture, and even beyond (McPherron and Christopher 1988; Chapman 2000; and Stevanovic 1997).

Although the phenomenon of house burning is pervasive throughout the Cucuteni-Trypillian culture's existence, it was by no means the only southeastern European Neolithic society that experienced this. The British-American archaeologist Ruth Tringham has coined the term Burned House Horizon to describe the extent of the geographical region that indicates this repetitive practice of house burning in southeast Europe. She, along with Serbian archaeologist Mirjana Stevanović, mapped out this phenomenon from archaeological sites throughout the entire region, and came to the conclusion that:

Although I have referred to the ubiquity of burned building rubble in south-east European Neolithic settlements as the burned house horizon (Tringham 1984; 1990), it is clear from Stevanović's, Chapman's and my own analyses, that 'the burned house horizon' is neither a chronologically nor regionally homogenous phenomenon (Chapman 1999; Stevanović 1996, 2002; Stevanović and Tringham 1998). For example early Neolithic houses have more artifacts deposited in them, and it is in these early Neolithic phases that burned human remains are most likely to occur (Chapman 1999). Human remains occur again in the late Eneolithic (Gumelniţa/Karanovo VI). The presence or absence of human remains in the rubble of burned houses is clearly of great significance.

Periodization table of Neolithic cultures that practiced house burning
Name of Culture	Location of culture	Duration of Practice
Criș culture	Bulgaria, Moldavia, Serbia, Wallachia	5900 to 4750 BC
Starčevo culture	northwest Bulgaria, Eastern Croatia, Serbia, Drina Valley in Eastern Bosnia and Herzegovina, southern Vojvodina	5750 to 5250 BC
Dudești culture	southeast Muntenia	5500 to 5250 BC
Vinča culture	Serbia, Transylvania	5500 to 4000 BC
Szakálhát group	southern Hungary, Vojvodina, northern Transylvania	5260 to 4880 BC
Boian culture	northern Bulgaria, Muntenia, southeast Transylvania	5250 to 4400 BC
Tisza culture	Hungary, Moldavia, Slovakia, Transylvania, western Ukraine, Vojvodina	4880 to 4400 BC
Gumelnița-Karanovo culture	eastern Wallachia, northern Dobruja	4400 to 3800 BC
Bubanj-Sălcuța-Krivodol group	northwestern Bulgaria, Oltenia, southern Serbia	4300 to 3800 BC.
Cucuteni-Trypillian culture	Moldavia, Transylvania, Western Ukraine to Dnieper River	4800 to 3200 BC.
Note: Data based on Ruth Tringham, 2005, and Liz Mellish and Nick Green. All locations and dates are approximate.

Although the practice of house burning took place among a handful of different Neolithic cultures in southeast Europe, it is most widely known among the Cucuteni-Trypillian culture for a number of reasons:

- The Cucuteni-Trypillian culture had the largest settlements in history up to their time.
- There is evidence that every single settlement in this culture probably practiced house burning.
- This culture practiced house burning for a longer period of time (1600 years), and for a later date (up to 3200 BC), than any of the other cultures.
- The Cucuteni-Trypillian culture was considered by some scholars to be the largest and most influential of the Neolithic cultures of eastern Europe during the transition to the Eneolithic period.

== Accident vs. intentional debate ==
=== Accidental fire argument ===
Some of the burned sites contained large quantities of stored food that was partially destroyed by the fires that burned the houses. Additionally, there was a high risk of fire due to the use of primitive ovens in these homes. These two facts support the theory that the buildings were burned accidentally or due to enemy attack, as it could be argued that nobody would intentionally burn their food supplies along with their homes.

=== Intentional fire argument ===
Some historians claim that settlements were intentionally burned in a repeated cycle of construction and destruction. Serbian archeologist Mirjana Stevanovic writes: "it is unlikely that the houses were burned as a result of a series of accidents or for any structural and technological reasons but rather that they were destroyed by deliberate burning and most likely for reasons of a symbolic nature".

House-burning experiments have been carried out by Arthur Bankoff and Frederick Winter in 1977, Gary Shaffer in 1993, and Stevanovic in 1997. In their experiment, Bankoff and Winter constructed a model of a partially dilapidated Neolithic house, and then set it on fire in a way that would replicate how an accidental fire would have perhaps started from an untended cooking-hearth fire. They then allowed the fire to burn unchecked for over thirty hours. Although the fire rapidly spread to the thatched roof, destroying it in the process, in the end less than one percent of the clay in the walls was fired (turned into ceramic material), which is counter to the large amount of fired-clay wall rubble that is found in the Cucuteni-Trypillian settlement ruins. Additionally, the experimental burning left the walls almost entirely intact. It would have been relatively easy for the roof to have been repaired quickly, the ash cleared away, and the house reoccupied. These results are typical for all of the modern experiments that have been done to try to recreate these ancient house burnings. Stevanovic, an expert archeological ceramicist, describes how in order to produce the large amount of fired clay rubble found in the ruins, that enormous quantities of extra fuel would have had to be placed next to the walls to create enough heat to vitrify the clay.

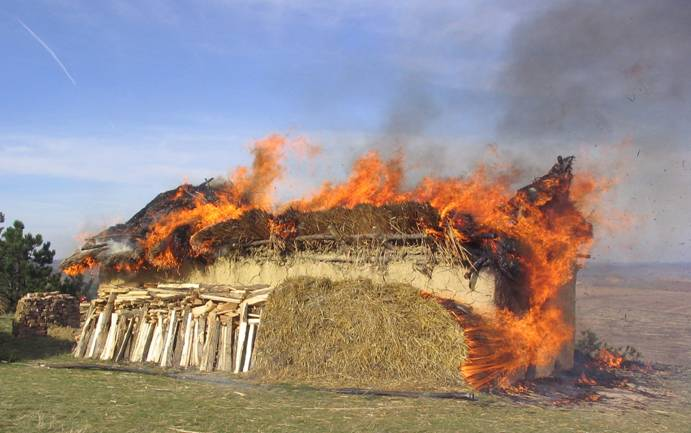
Recreation of a Cucuteni-Trypillian house burning; note the amount of extra fuel (straw and wood) added to the outside of the clay walls to increase the temperature needed for ceramic vitrification.

== Theories ==
An analysis of the possibilities for why the Cucuteni-Trypillian settlements burned periodically produces the following theories:

1. Accidental: According to this theory, the houses were burned by accidental fire. To support this theory, the following conditions are to be found at these sites:
  1. Close proximity of the houses to one another
  2. Grain, textiles and other highly combustible materials were stored in the house
  3. Improperly stored grain in the house increased the risk of spontaneous combustion
  Although this theory may explain how some of the structures might have burned, it does not satisfactorily explain the cause for all of them. As discussed above, experimentation has given very strong evidence that would make it difficult to support the theory that these settlements were periodically burned as a result of accidental fires.
2. Weatherproofing: In 1940, the Russian archaeologist Evgeniy Yuryevich Krichevski proposed the theory that the Cucuteni-Trypillian houses were burned as a way to strengthen the structure of the walls, and to insulate the floor against dampness and mold. Krichevski proposed that the fire would harden the clay within the walls and floors, effectively turning it into a hard ceramic surface. However, arguments against this theory point out that the archaeological evidence includes burned rubble that came from the collapsed walls and destroyed floors. Additionally, valuable artefacts were also found burned and buried within the rubble, which would not likely have happened if the inhabitants set the fires to harden the clay in the structure, since they would most likely have removed such items before starting the fire.
3. Aggression: This theory holds that the settlements were burned as a result of attacks from enemies. However, as with the accident theory, this theory is also unable to satisfy all of the archaeological evidence that has been found at Cucuteni-Trypillian sites. For instance, there have not been any human remains discovered within the burned ruins of the buildings. Neither have there been found any human remains with projectile points such as arrow or spear heads lodged within the skeleton. This would indicate that, although acts of aggression were possible, they actually were not very common. Certainly, it indicates that warfare did not play a large role in the life of these people. Thus, due to the lack of supporting evidence for aggression, it is difficult to support this theory as the reason for the cyclical and repetitive burning of these settlements.
4. Recycling of building materials: In 1993, Gary Shaffer used archaeomagnetic dating and experimentation to test the theory that old, dilapidated houses were burned for the purpose of recycling the clay within their structure to use in the construction of new buildings. Wattle-and-daub construction is prone to dilapidation, which would suggest that after a period of time the buildings would naturally begin to show signs of much wear and disrepair, posing a potential threat to its occupants and others. In such a case, it could be argued that the solution would be to have an entire settlement's structures burned in such a way as to produce a plentiful supply of hardened, fired ceramic material to use in reconstructing new houses out of the old. Shaffer discovered some of the walls in a Cucuteni-Trypillian site that had been partially constructed from recycled ceramic wattle-and-daub material from a previous building, thus lending support to this claim.
5. Fumigation: Another theory posits that the fires were used for sanitary reasons to smoke or fumigate a building, in order to get rid of pests, disease, insects, or witches. However, the evidence does not support this viewpoint. All of the structures within these settlements were completely burned and destroyed. Because the damage from the fire was almost total for the entire settlement, it would be illogical if fumigation was the only intent.
6. Demolition to create space: This hypothesis argues that the residents of Late Neolithic sites burned their own structures in order to free up space within the walls of the settlement. However, the archeological record shows that houses were rebuilt directly on top of the pre-existing foundations of the destroyed buildings. It would be a logical conclusion that the inhabitants of the destroyed home would take up residence in the new house built directly on top of it. This would indicate that no new building space was created by burning the old structures.
7. Symbolic end of house: Some scholars have theorized that the buildings were burned ritually, regularly and deliberately in order to mark the end of the "life" of the house. The terms "Domicide" and "Domithanasia" have been coined to refer to this practice. This theory postulates that members of the Cucuteni-Trypillian culture may have been animistic, believing that inanimate objects, including houses, had souls or spirits. It also possibly indicates that these people believed in reincarnation, in that the "soul" of the old, burned house would be "reborn" into the new, rebuilt structure above it. Using this theory, objects belonging to the house (including food, containers, and ritual objects) could possibly have been viewed as sharing the same "spirit" as the house structure itself. In destroying the house, it would then also be logical to destroy various other items that were deemed to be part of the house, which would explain why these kinds of items have been found buried in the rubble. The physical act of destroying the entire settlement by intentionally burning it to the ground would have required an organized joint-community effort, involving stacking huge amounts of fuel around the walls of the structures, and then torching the entire settlement. Such a systematic act of destruction would leave behind the kind of evidence that is to be found in the archeological sites.
