= Talne urban hromada =

Urban hromada of Cherkasy Oblast, Ukraine

Talne urban hromada Тальнівська міська громада
- Hromada
- Interactive map of Talne urban hromada
- Country: Ukraine
- Oblast: Cherkasy
- Raion: Zvenyhorodka

Area
  - Total: 109.22 km^{2} (42.17 sq mi)

Population (2018)
  - Total: 15,585
  - Density: 142.69/km^{2} (369.57/sq mi)
- Settlements: 43
- Cities: 1
- Rural settlements: 8
- Villages: 34
- Website: talnivska-gromada.gov.ua

Talne urban territorial hromada (Ukrainian: Тальнівська міська територіальна громада, romanized: Talnivska miska terytorialna hromada) is one of the hromadas of Ukraine, in Zvenyhorodka Raion within Cherkasy Oblast. Its administrative centre is the city of Talne.

== Composition ==
The hromada contains 43 settlements: 1 city (Talne), 8 rural settlements (Dobrianka, Levada, Nova Pavlivka, Novomaidanetske, Shalaske, Stepne, Tarasivka, Zdobutok), and 34 villages:

- Antonivka
- Bilashky
- Chervone
- Chesnopil
- Dovhenke
- Hlybochok
- Hordashivka
- Huliaika
- Kobyliaky
- Kobrynova Hreblia
- Kobrynove
- Kolodyste
- Korsunka
- Kryvi Kolina
- Lashchova
- Lehedzyne
- Lisove
- Lotasheve
- Maidanetske
- Moshuriv
- Onopriivka
- Papuzhyntsi
- Pavlivka Druha
- Pavlivka Persha
- Pishchana
- Potash
- Romanivka
- Shaulykha
- Sokolivochka
- Talianky
- Veselyi Kut
- Vyshnopil
- Zaliske
- Zelenkiv
