= Maidanetske =

Village in Cherkasy Oblast, Ukraine

Maidanetske Майданецьке
- Village
- Location of Maidanetske Maidanetske (Ukraine)
- Coordinates: 48°48′36″N 30°42′01″E
- Country: Ukraine
- Oblast: Cherkasy Oblast
- Raion: Zvenyhorodka Raion
- Hromada: Talne urban hromada

Government
- Elevation: 169 m (554 ft)

Population
  - Total: 5,005
- Time zone: UTC+2
  - Summer (DST): UTC+3
- Postal code: 20442
- Area code: +380 4731

Immovable Monument of National Significance of Ukraine
- Official name: Поселення "Майданецьке" (Maidanetske settlement)
- Type: Archaeology
- Reference no.: 230030-Н

Maidanetske (Ukrainian: Майданецьке) is a village located within the Zvenyhorodka Raion (district) of the Cherkasy Oblast (province), about 235 kilometers (146 mi) driving distance south of Kyiv. It belongs to Talne urban hromada, one of the hromadas of Ukraine.

It is a small farming community located primarily on a hill overlooking the Tal'ianki River. Maidanetske is home to one of the three district hospitals in the Talne Raion. A local museum was built in the 1990s that focuses on the ancient history of this place, including a panoramic reconstructed model of a large Cucuteni-Trypillian settlement located here in prehistoric times, as well as some of the artifacts uncovered from around the village.

Until 18 July 2020, Maidanetske belonged to Talne Raion. The raion was abolished in July 2020 as part of the administrative reform of Ukraine, which reduced the number of raions of Cherkasy Oblast to four. The area of Talne Raion was merged into Zvenyhorodka Raion.

== Archaeological remains ==
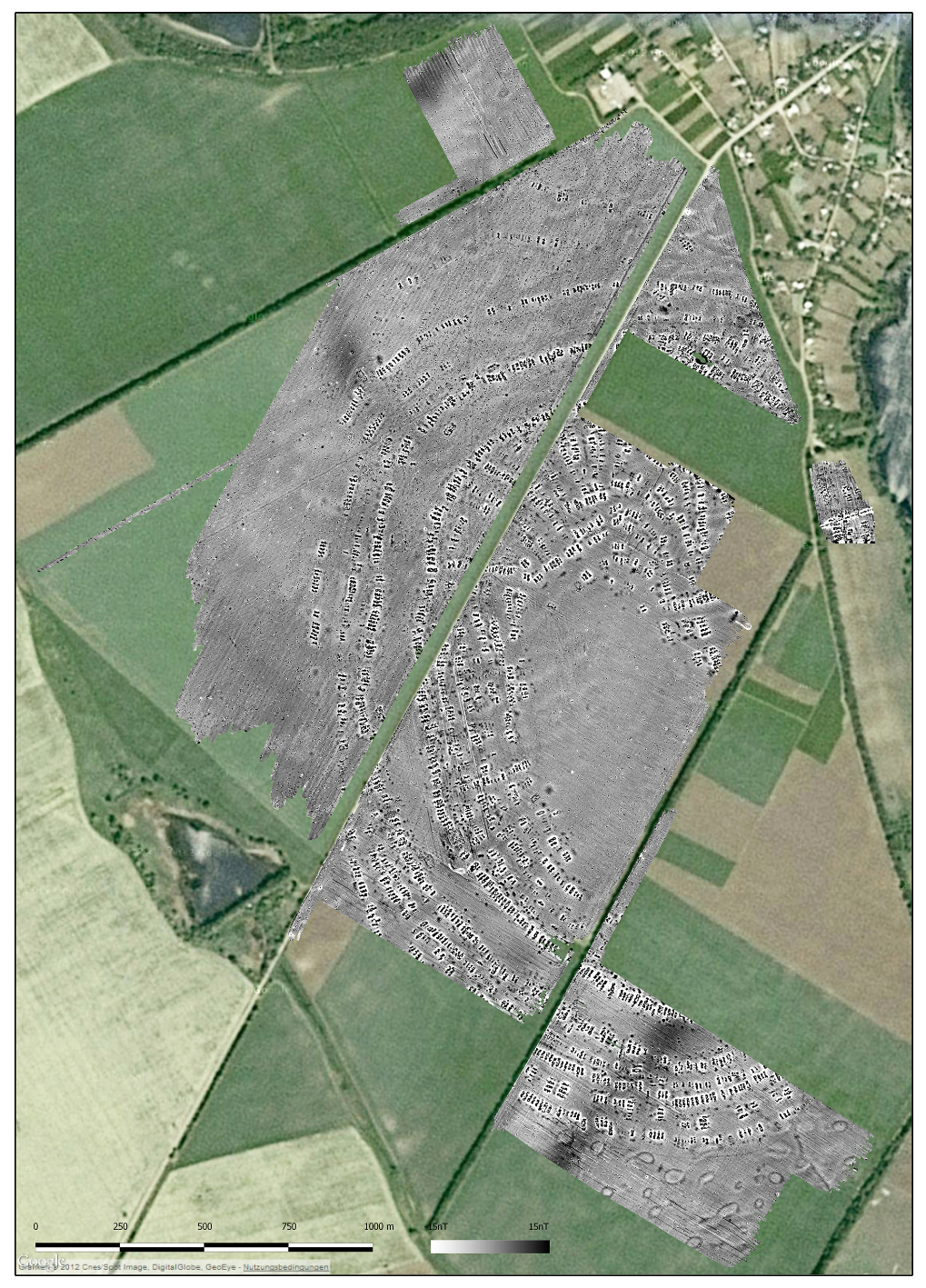
Maidanetske geomagnetic ground plan

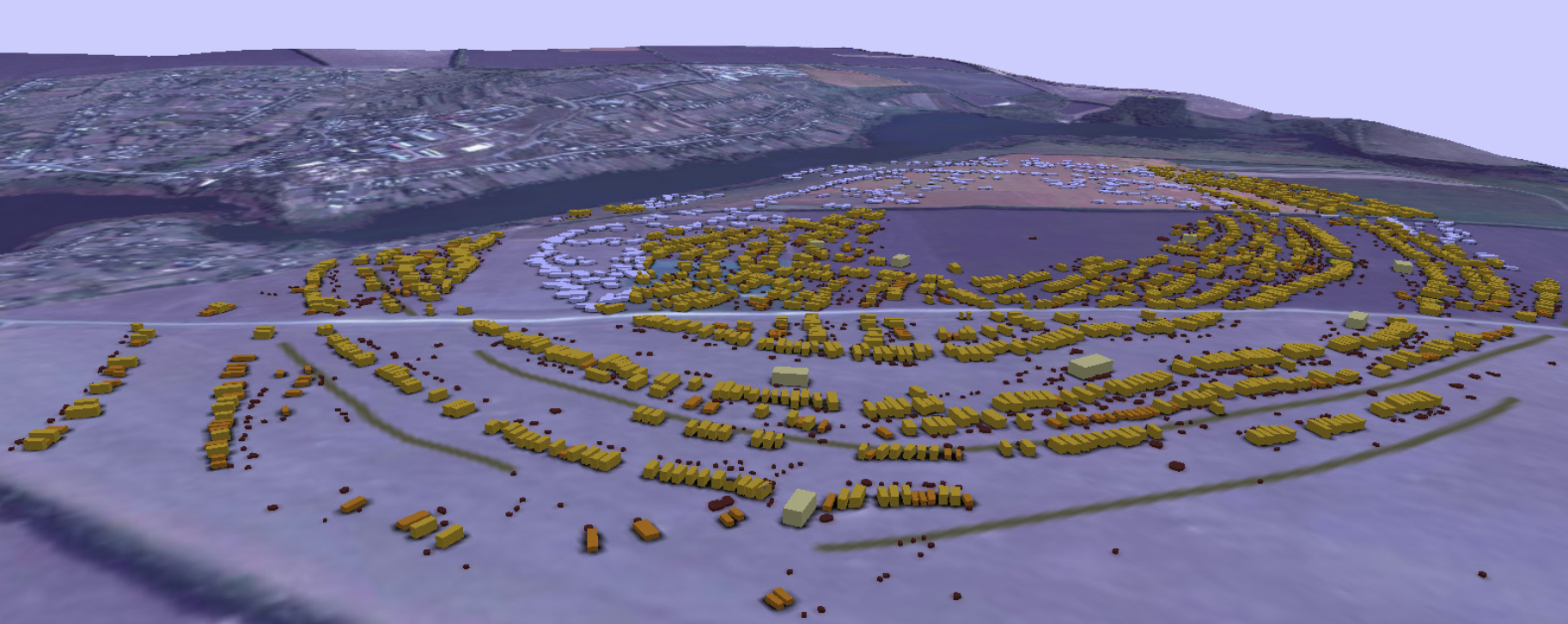
Maidanetske, 3D model.

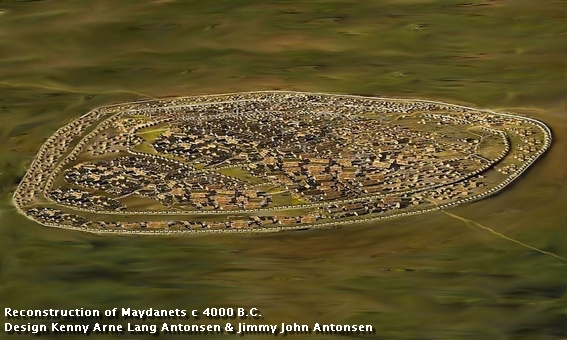
Maidanetske, artists' reconstruction

Maidanets was the location of two separate settlements of the Neolithic/Chalcolithic Cucuteni-Trypillian culture. The first settlement, encompassing about 2 hectares (4.9 acres), was inhabited near 5000 BC, and is located close to the outskirts of Maidanets along the road to Talne at a location called Hrebeniukiv Yar (Ukrainian: Гребенюків Яр). This site was partially excavated by M. Shmaglij and N. Burdo between 1981 and 1989, during which time three dwellings and two bordei (earth-sheltered dwellings) were discovered and examined.

The second, much larger Cucuteni-Trypillian settlement is located on the left bank of the Tal'ianki River, west of Maidanets, which was inhabited around 3700–3600 BC. The settlement encompassed about 250 hectares (620 acres), measuring 1.5 kilometers (0.93 mi) in length and 1.1 kilometers (0.68 mi) wide, and was laid out in an oval pattern. This site was explored by an archaeological team led by M. Shmalij from 1971 to 1991, who employed magnetometric analysis to map out the settlement (made by V. Dudkin), revealing a total of 1575 buildings, including dwellings, fortifications, sanctuaries, and some two-storied houses (on 180 ha explored area). The excavation of the site produced almost 50 artifacts, including a unique collection of painted pottery and figurines. This settlement was one of the largest of the Cucuteni-Trypillian, making it also one of the largest settlements in the world during the time that it flourished.

New research (2014) indicates a much more dense populated site with at least 2297 and up to 2968 houses existed at the same time circa 3700 BC. Thus the population are also far larger than before thought with conservative estimations at 12,000, a probable average of 29,000 inhabitants but with the possibility of 46,000 inhabitants.

In addition to the two Cucuteni-Trypillian cultural sites, Maidanets is also the location two other ancient archaeological sites. Two Yamnaya culture tumuli (burial mounds) are located near the village, containing eight graves dating back to the middle of the third millennium BC. Also, in the nearby Geliv Stav location, are the remains of a small settlement dating to the fourth century AD of the Chernyakhov culture.

In addition to the local museum in Maidanets, archaeological artifacts taken from local sites may be found in the Cherkasy Regional Museum, the Museum of Agriculture in Talne, the National Museum of History in Kyiv, and the Institute of Archaeology, also in Kyiv. There are also other nearby towns that are host to Neolithic settlements, including the village of Talianki, where the largest of all the Cucuteni-Trypillian settlements is located.

== See also ==
- Old Europe (archaeology)
- Yamna culture
- Neolithic Europe
- Chalcolithic Europe
- Prehistory of Southeastern Europe
- History of Ukraine
