= Kosenivka =

Ancient mega-settlement in Ukraine

Kosenivka, in Ukraine, is the site of an ancient mega-settlement belonging to the Cucuteni–Trypillia culture dating to 3800–3600BC. This site has gained importance as the remains of seven individuals were found in a burnt house. Probably, the individuals belong to the house and maybe, it was a family. This finding helps to better estimate the number of inhabitants in individual settlements and the entire Cucuteni–Trypillia-culture.

== See also ==
- Cucuteni–Trypillia culture
- Danubian culture
