= Talne =

City in Cherkasy Oblast, Ukraine

Talne Тальне
- City
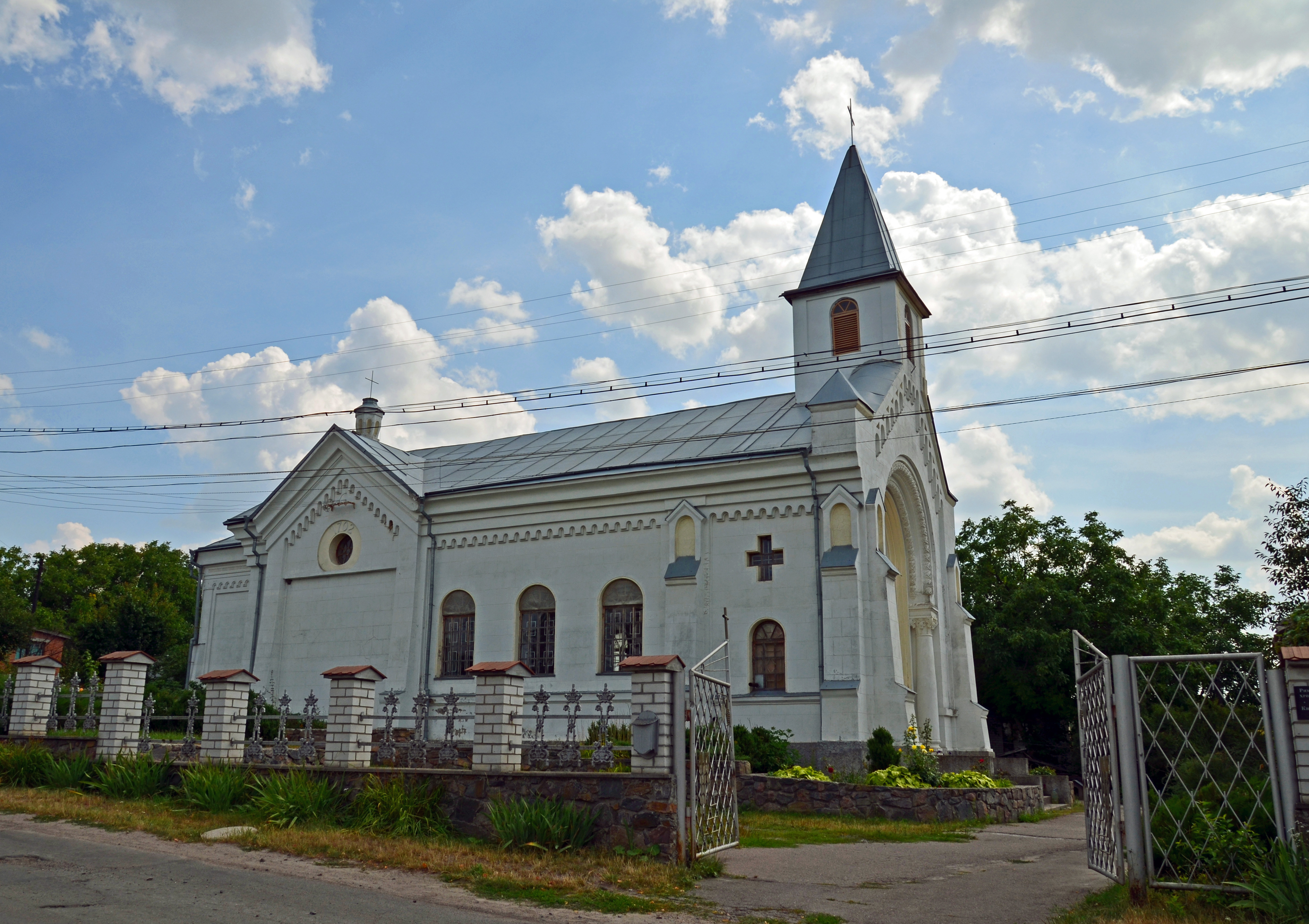
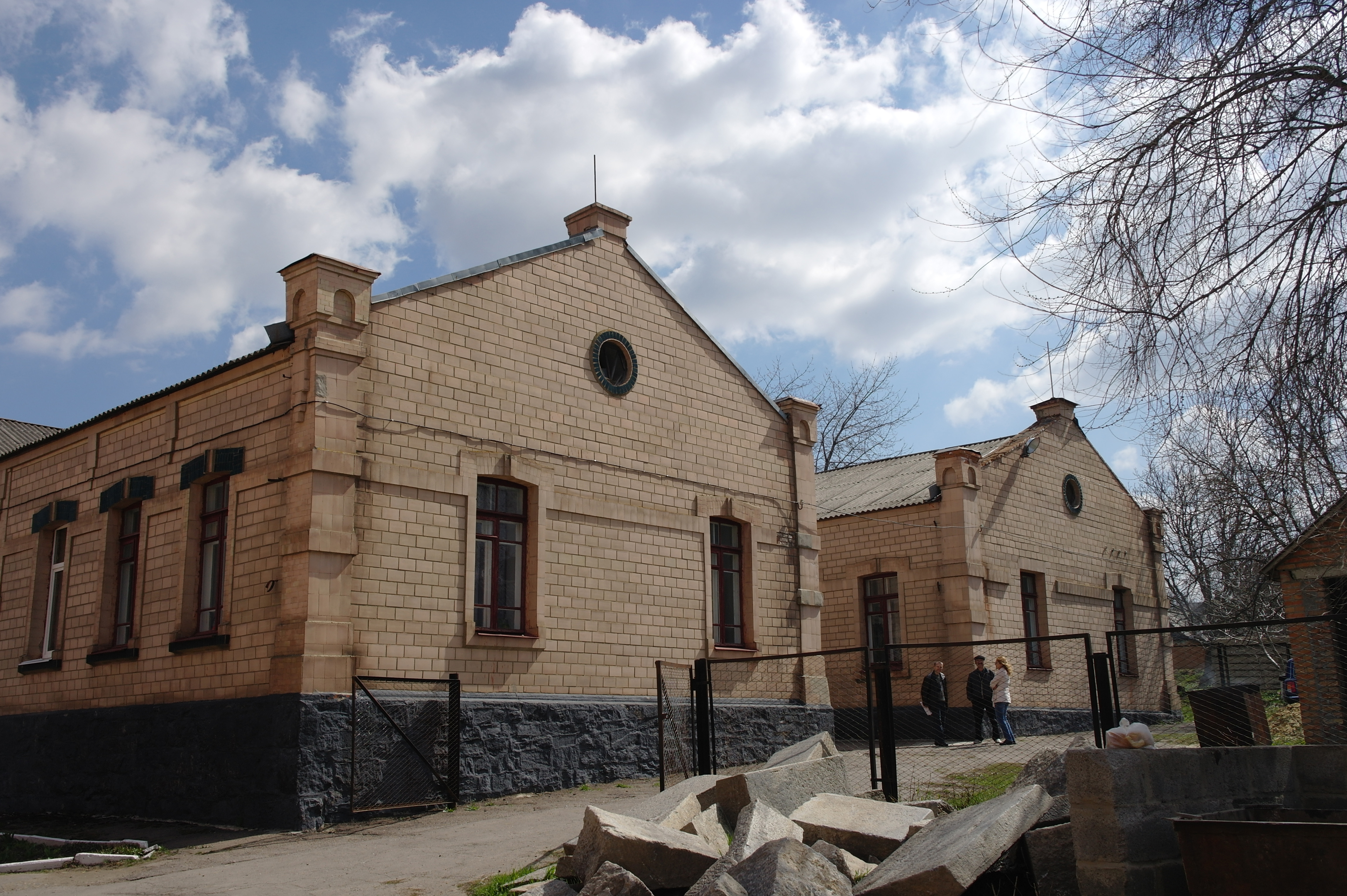
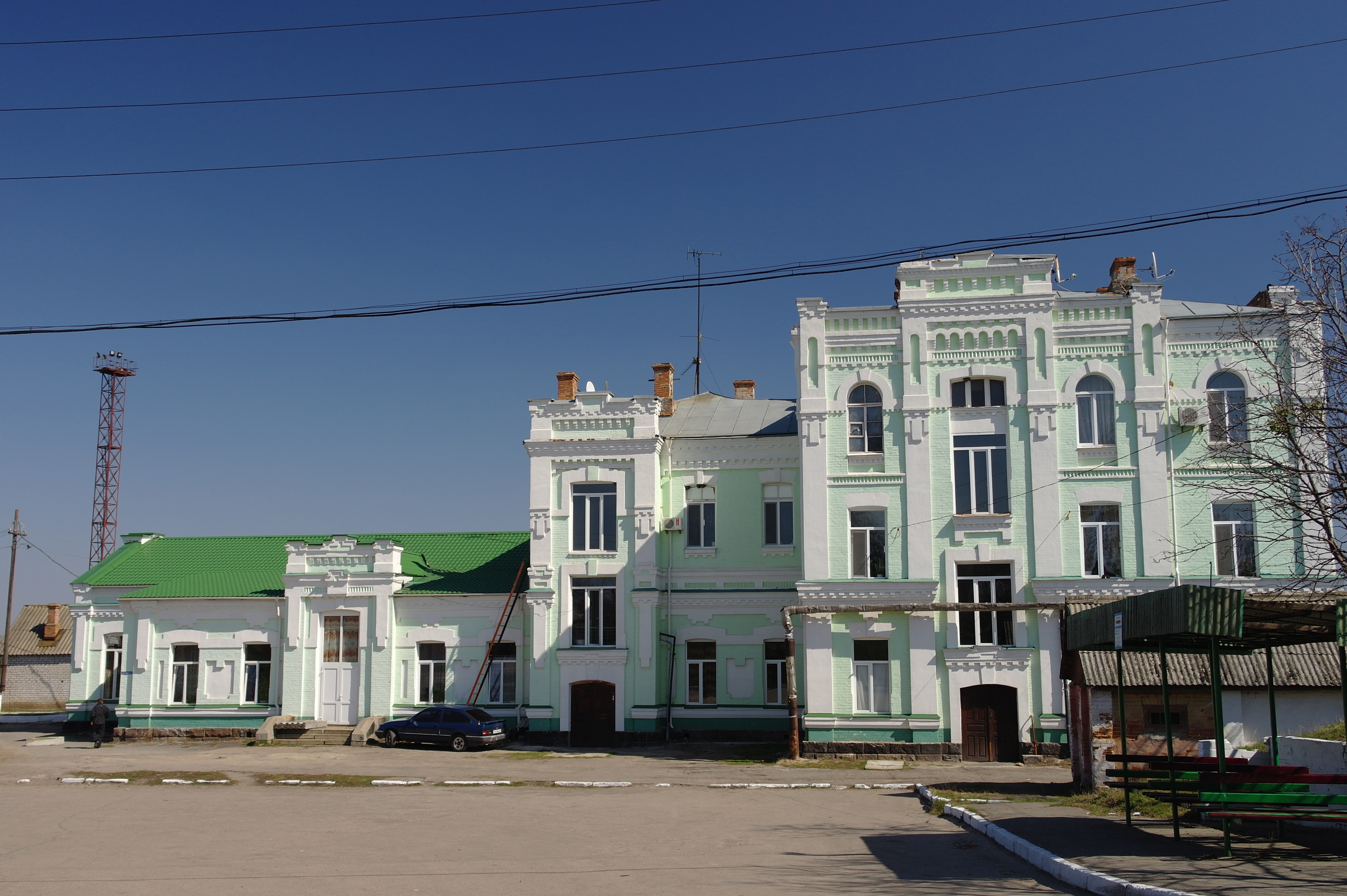
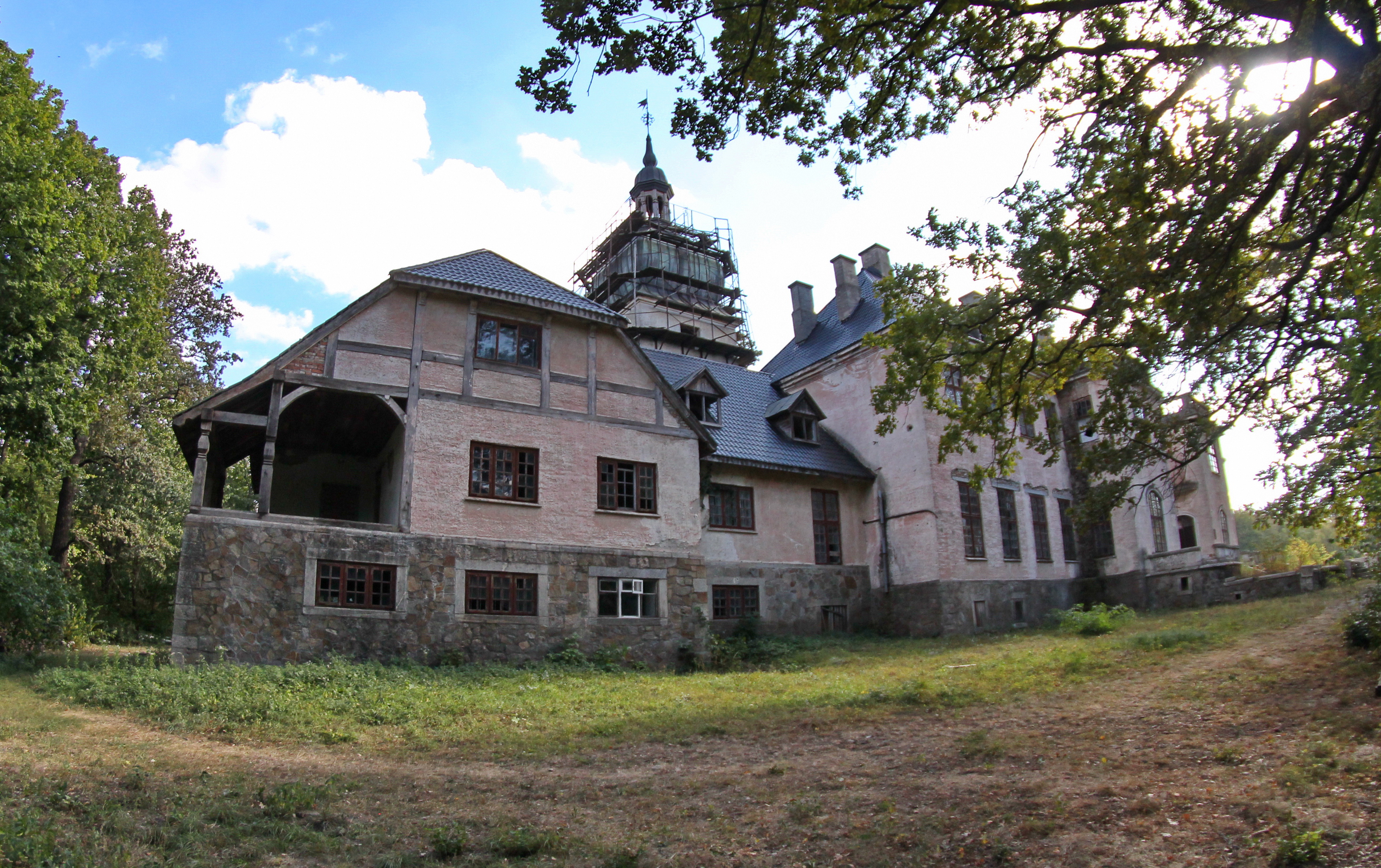
- Clockwise from top: Saint Anne Cathedral; Train Station; Palace of Count Shuvalov; The Tea House

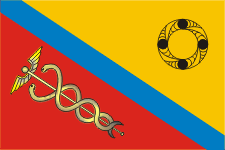
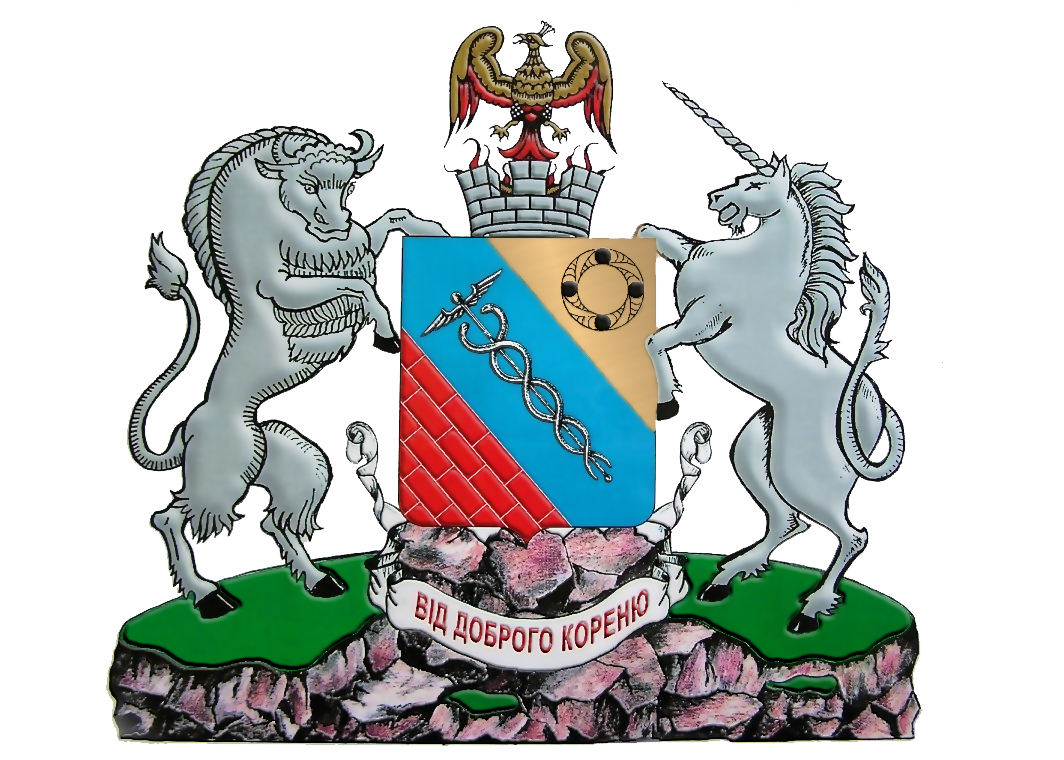
- Flag Coat of arms
- Interactive map of Talne
- Location within Cherkasy Oblast Location within Ukraine
- Coordinates: 48°53′19″N 30°42′15″E
- Country: Ukraine
- Oblast: Cherkasy Oblast
- Raion: Zvenyhorodka Raion
- Hromada: Talne urban hromada
- First mentioned: 1646
- City rights: 1938

Government
  - Mayor: Oleksandr Bilenko

Area
  - Total: 161 km^{2} (62 sq mi)
- Elevation: 130 m (430 ft)

Population (2022)
  - Total: 12,839
- Postal code: 20400-20408
- Area code: +380-4731
- Website: http://misto.talnern.org.ua/

Talne (Ukrainian: Тальне, IPA: [tɐlʲˈnɛ]) is a city in Zvenyhorodka Raion, Cherkasy Oblast (province) of Ukraine. It hosts the administration of Talne urban hromada, one of the hromadas of Ukraine. It had a population of 12,649 (2024); 12,839 (2022 estimate).

During the nineteenth century Talne was a centre of Jewish learning and seat of the Tolner Hasidim, a sect of Hasidic Judaism.

== Administrative status ==
Since 1938 it has been a city. Until 18 July 2020, Talne served as an administrative center of Talne Raion. The raion was abolished in July 2020 as part of the administrative reform of Ukraine, which reduced the number of raions of Cherkasy Oblast to four. The area of Talne Raion was merged into Zvenyhorodka Raion.

== Demographics ==
In 1989 the population of the city was 17,169 people.

== Notable people ==
- Mischa Elman, violinist
- Anatoly Kasheida, writer
- Denis Shevchuk, football player
- Petro Vesklyarov, theater and television actor
- Charles S. Zimmerman, American politician and labor leader.

== See also ==
- List of cities in Ukraine

== Gallery ==
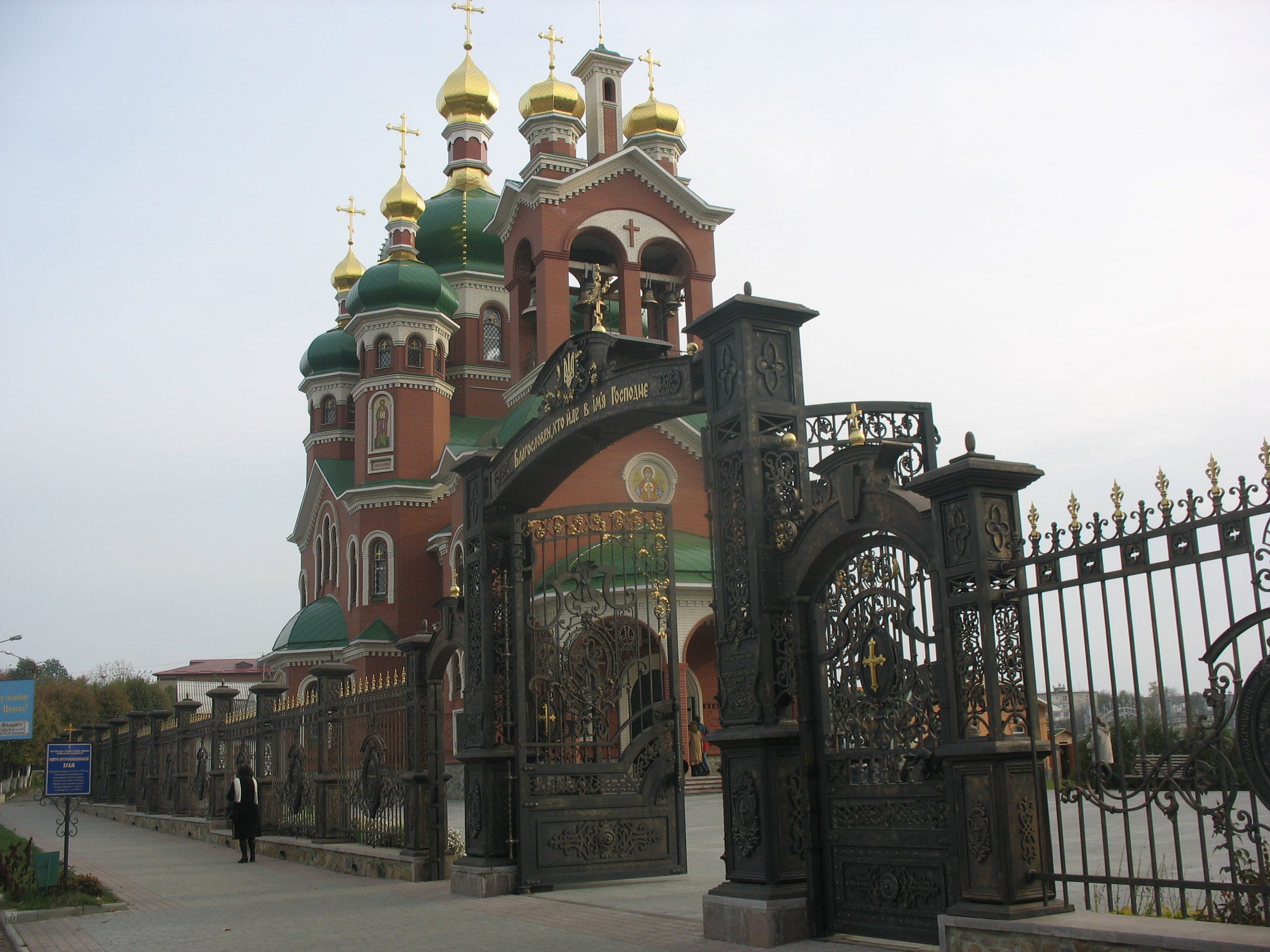
Saints Peter and Paul Church

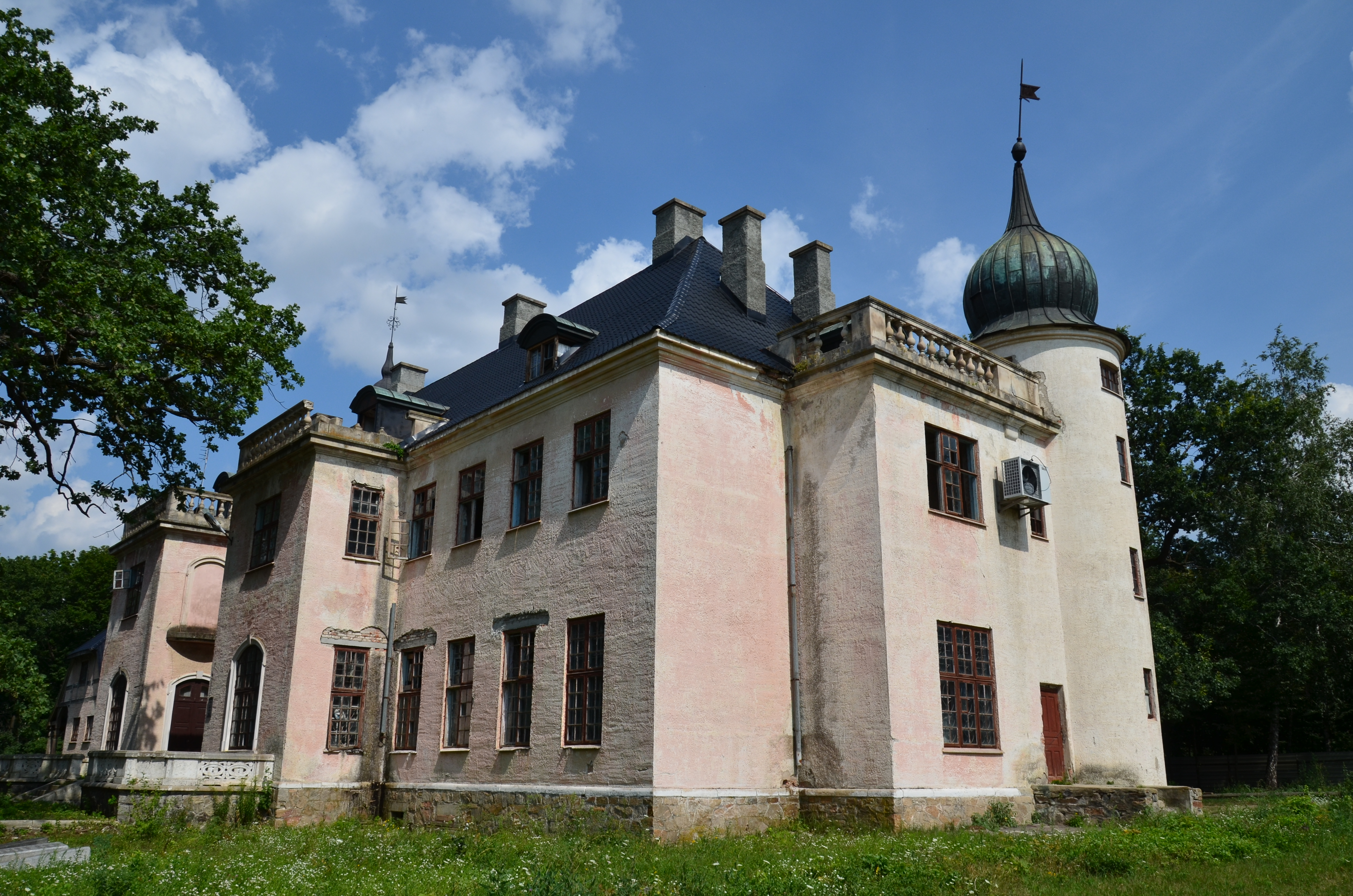
Shuvalov Castle and Park
