= Dobrovody =

Coordinates: 48°45′58″N 30°23′23″E

Dobrovody Доброводи
- Village
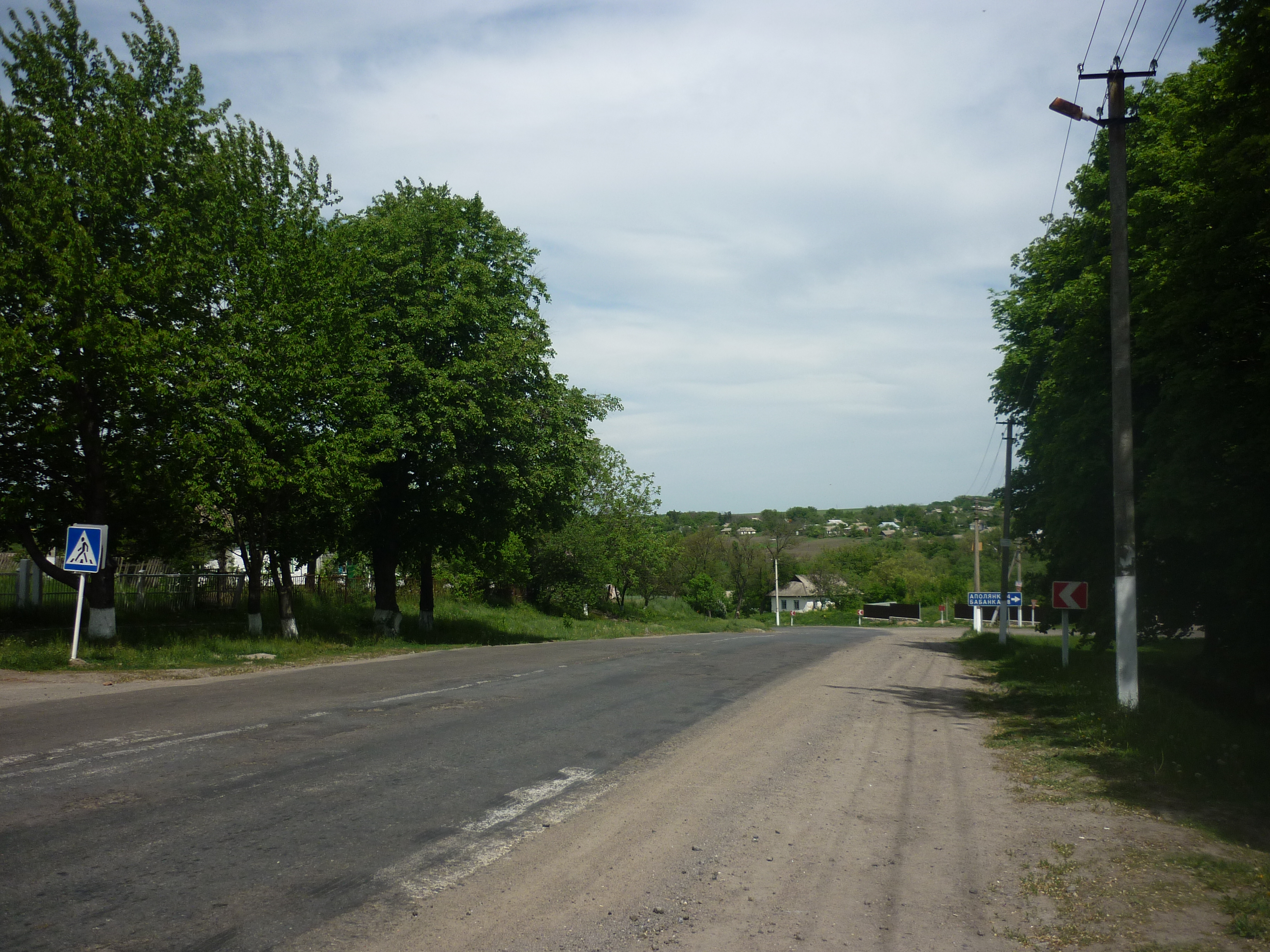

- Location of Dobrovody Dobrovody (Ukraine)
- Country: Ukraine
- Oblast: Cherkasy Oblast
- Raion: Uman Raion
- Hromada: Dmytrushky rural hromada
- Elevation: 181 m (594 ft)

Population
  - Total: 975
- Postal code: 20335

Dobrovody (Ukrainian: Доброводи) is a village located within the Uman Raion (district) of the Cherkasy Oblast (province), Ukraine.

== Archaeological site ==
Dobrovody is a 4th millennium BC site of the Cucuteni–Trypillia culture. The newest research (2014) indicates that Dobrovody could have contained up to 16,200 citizens, and was one of the largest cities in the world in its day. The total area is about 2.5 km^{2}. Using aerial photography, a fortified city with blocks and streets can be seen. The excavated dwellings had a standard size of 12 × 5 m with a typical interior for the buildings of the Tomaszów group: a stove, a long bench-podium under the wall, a round altar, pithos. At the angle of one of the inhabitants found a ritual burial of a bull's skull. The main category of finds are fragments of pottery collected on the surface and from excavations. Dominated by tableware painted with dark brown paint on orange engobe. A fragment of a housing model with a stove similar to the well-known Sushkiv housing model was found.
