= Oldest city =

Oldest city could refer to:

- Historical urban community sizes
- List of oldest continuously inhabited cities
- List of largest cities throughout history
