= Historical urban community sizes =

This article lists historical urban community sizes based on the estimated populations of selected human settlements from 7000 BC – AD 2000, organized by archaeological periods.

Many of the figures are uncertain, especially in ancient times. Estimating population sizes before censuses were conducted is a difficult task.

== Neolithic settlements ==
| Town | Location | 7000 BC | 6000 BC | 5000 BC | 4000 BC | 3800 BC | 3700 BC |
|---|---|---|---|---|---|---|---|
| 'Ain Ghazal | Jordan | 2,000-2,500 | | | | | |
| Beidha | Jordan | 1,000 | | | | | |
| Çatalhöyük | Turkey | 1,000–10,000 | | | | | |
| Çayönü | Turkey | 8630-7680 | | | | | |
| Choirokoitia | Cyprus | 300–600 | 2,000 | | | | |
| Lepenski Vir | Serbia | | 150–1,000 | | | | |
| Nea Nikomedeia | Greece | | 500–700 | | | | |
| Okoliste | Bosnia and Herzegovina | | | 1,000–3,000 | | | |
| Vinča-Belo Brdo | Serbia | | | 2,000–2,500 | | | |
| Sesklo | Greece | | | 1,000–5,000 | | | |
| Dobrovody | Ukraine | | | | 16,000 | 10,000–16,000 | |
| Fedorovka | Ukraine | | | | 6,000 | | |
| Mehrgarh | Pakistan | 1,000–10,000 | | | | | |
| Maydanets | Ukraine | | | | | 10,000 | 10,000–46,000 (Note: Dobrovody and Maydanets Suggested to be housing up to 10,000 people in Modelski's text (pp. 24–25), The estimate is based on the author's personal communication with Mikhail Videiko, Institute of Archaeology, Kyiv, October 2002 (p. 75). The previous estimates by S. I. Kruts for Maydanets and Talianki are 8,000 (1,575 housed within 270 ha) and 14,000 (2,700 houses within 450 ha), respectively (Pitskhelauri, K. N., and Chernykh, E. N. Eds., Kavkaz v sisteme paleometallicheskikh kultur Evrazii, Metsniereba, Tbilisi, 1989, pp. 146–156.).) |
| Nebelivka | Ukraine | | | | 17,000 | | |
| Talianki | Ukraine | | | | | 15,000–25,000–30,000 | 10,000–15,000 |
| Tell Brak | Syria | | | 4,000 | 5,000 | | |
| Uruk | Iraq | | | | 5,000 | | |

== Bronze Age ==
Table 1: 3700–2600 BC
| City | Location | 3700 BC | 3400 BC | 3100 BC | 2800 BC | 2600 BC |
|---|---|---|---|---|---|---|
| Adab | Iraq | | | | 11,000 | |
| Anshan | Iran | | | 10,000 | 10,000 | |
| Bad-tibira | Iraq | | | | 16,000 | |
| Eridu | Iraq | 6,000–10,000 | | | | |
| Habuba Kabira | Syria | | | 6,000–8,000 | | |
| Harappa | Pakistan | | | | | 35,000 |
| Kish | Iraq | | | | 40,000 | |
| Lagash | Iraq | | | | | 40,000 |
| Larak/Larsa | Iraq | 10,000 | 10,000 | | | |
| Manika, Greece | Greece | | | | 6,000–15,000 | 6,000–15,000 |
| Memphis | Egypt | | | 30,000 | | |
| Mohenjo-daro | Pakistan | | | | | 41,250 |
| Nekhen | Egypt | | 5,000–10,000 | | | |
| Nippur | Iraq | | | | 13,000 | |
| Shahr-i Sokhta | Iran | | | 20,000 | | |
| Shuruppak | Iraq | | | | 20,000 | |
| Suheri | | | | 13,000 | 10,000 | |
| Susa | Iran | | 8,000 | | | |
| Tell Brak | Syria | | 8,000 | 22,000 | 20,000 | |
| Thebes, Greece | Greece | | | | | 4,000–6,000 |
| Umma | Iraq | | | | 26,000 | |
| Ur | Iraq | | | | 6,000 | |
| Uruk | Iraq | 8,000; 14,000 | 20,000 | 40,000–50,000 | 80,000 | 80,000 |

Table 2: 2500–1200 BC
| City | Location | 2500 BC | 2300 BC | 2000 BC | 1800 BC | 1600 BC | 1360 BC | 1200 BC |
|---|---|---|---|---|---|---|---|---|
| Athens | Greece | | | | | | 10,000 | 10,000–15,000 |
| Akrotiri (prehistoric city) | Greece | | | | | 8,000–30,000 | | |
| Adab | Iraq | 13,000 | 10,000 | 10,000 | 10,000 | | | |
| Akkad | Iraq | | 36,000 | | | | | |
| Amarna | Egypt | | | | | | | |
| Anshan | Iran | 10,000 | 10,000 | 10,000 | 10,000 | | | |
| Avaris/Pi-Ramses | Egypt | | | | | 100,000 | | 160,000 |
| Babylon | Iraq | | | | 65,000 | | | 80,000 |
| Dur-Kurigalzu | Iraq | | | | | | | |
| Ebla | Syria | | 30,000 | | | | | |
| Erlitou | China | | | | 24,000–35,000 | | | |
| Harappa | Pakistan | | 10,000 | | | | | |
| Hattusa | Turkey | | | | | | 40,000 | 40,000 |
| Hazor | Israel | | | | | | | |
| Heliopolis | Egypt | | | | | | | |
| Heracleopolis | Egypt | | | | | | | |
| Isin | Iraq | | | 40,000 | 20,000 | | | |
| Kerma | Sudan | | | | | | | |
| Kesh | Iraq | 11,000 | | | | | | |
| Kish | Iraq | 25,000 | 10,000 | 40,000 | | | | |
| Knossos | Greece | 1,300–2,000 | | 18,000 | | 20,000 | 30,000 | |
| Lagash | Iraq | 40,000 | 10,000 | 30,000 | 10,000 | | | |
| Larak/Larsa | Iraq | 10,000 | | 40,000 | 20,000 | | | |
| Manika, Greece | Greece | 6,000–15,000 | 6,000–15,000 | | | | | |
| Malia | Greece | | | | | 5,000–10,000–12,500 | | |
| Mari | Syria | | | | | | | |
| Memphis | Egypt | | 30,000–35,000 | 60,000 | 30,000 | 22,000 | 32,000 | 50,000 |
| Mohenjo-daro | Pakistan | 20,000 | 20,000 | 10,000 | | | | |
| Mozah | | 15,000 | 15,000 | | | | | |
| Mycenae | Greece | | 20,000 | | | | 30,000–35,000 | 30,000 |
| Namazga-Tepe | Turkmenistan | | 14,000 | 14,000 | | | | |
| Nekhen | Egypt | | | | | 21,000 | | |
| Niniveh | Iraq | | | | | 23,000 | | 33,000 |
| Nippur | Iraq | 20,000 | 10,000 | 10,000 | | | | |
| Palaikastro | Greece | | | | | 18,000 | | |
| San Lorenzo Tenochtitlán | Mexico | | | | | | | 7,500 |
| Shahr-i Sokhta | Iran | 20,000 | 20,000 | | | | | |
| Shuruppak | Iraq | 17,000 | | | | | | |
| Suheri | | 10,000 | 10,000 | 10,000 | | | | |
| Susa | Iran | | | 25,000 | 25,000 | | | |
| Taosi | China | 10,000 | 14,000 | | | | | |
| Tell Brak | Syria | 15,000 | 15,000 | | | | | |
| Tell Churra | | | 20,000 | | | | | |
| Tell Leilan | Syria | 20,000 | 20,000 | | | | | |
| Thebes | Egypt | | | 40,000 | 40,000 | | 80,000 | 80,000 |
| Thebes, Greece | Greece | 4,000–6,000 | | | | | 8,000 | |
| Tiryns | Greece | 1,200–1,800 | | | | | 10,000 | 10,000–15,000 |
| Umma | Iraq | 34,000 | 20,000 | 10,000 | 20,000 | | | |
| Ur | Iraq | | | 60,000; 65,000 | | | | |
| Uruk | Iraq | 50,000 | | | | 75,000 | | |
| Yin (Anyang) | China | | | | | | | 50,000–120,000 |
| Zabala | Iraq | | 10,000 | 10,000 | 10,000 | | | |
| Zhengzhou | China | | | | | | 35,000 | |

== Iron Age ==
Table 1: 1000-400 BC
| City | Location | 1000 BC | 900 BC | 800 BC | 700 BC | 650 BC | 600 BC | 500 BC | 430 BC | 400 BC |
|---|---|---|---|---|---|---|---|---|---|---|
| Aegina | Greece | | | | | | | 20,000–40,000 | | 20,000–40,000 |
| Anuradhapura | Sri Lanka | | | | | | | | 48,000 | |
| Anyi | | | | | | | | 100,000 | | 100,000 |
| Athens | Greece | 2,500–5,000 | 2,500–5,000 | 2,500–5,000 | 10,000 | | | 20,000 | 40,000 | 25,000 |
| Agrigento | Italy | | | | | | | 40,000 | 40,000 | |
| Argos | Greece | | | | | | | 30,000–60,000 | | 30,000–60,000 |
| Ayodhya | India | | | | | | | | | |
| Babylon | Iraq | 45,000–100,000 (Note: Modelski's list of the world's largest cities treats Thebes and Haojing as the top cities with 100,000 inhabitants (p. 218), though the same list on the next page (p. 219) as well as Table 2 (c) place the population of Thebes at 120,000, while that for Haojing as well as Memphis and Babylon at 100,000 (pp. 33-34).) | | 47,000 | | 60,000 | 125,000 | 150,000 | 200,000 | 150,000 |
| Benares | India | | | | | | | | | |
| Capua | Italy | | | | | | | 100,000 | | 100,000 |
| Cerveteri | Italy | | | | | | 25,000–40,000 | | | |
| Chicheng | China | | | | | | | | | |
| Cuicuilco | Mexico | | | | | | | | | |
| Corinth | Greece | | | | 5,000 | | | 20,000 | | |
| Crotone | Italy | | | | | | | 50,000–80,000 | | |
| Ecbatana | Iran | | | | | | | | | |
| Haojing | China | 100,000 | 125,000 | 125,000 | | 33,000 | | | | |
| Hastinapur | India | | | | | | | | | |
| Jerusalem | Israel | 40,000 | | | | | | | 49,942 (445 BC) | |
| Kamarina | Italy | | | | | | | | 20,000 | |
| Kerch | Crimea Ukraine | | | | | | | | | 40,000 |
| Kingchow | China | | | | | | | | | |
| Kalḫu (Nimrud) | Iraq | | | 75,000 | | | | | | |
| Kosambi | India | | | | | 55,000 | | | | |
| Linzi | China | | | | 55,000–100,000 | 80,000–100,000 | 65,000–100,000 | 80,000–100,000 | 60,000–200,000 | 100,000–200,000 |
| Luoyang | China | 35,000–100,000 (Note: Chandler listed Thebes, Haoqing, and Chengzhou (Luoyang) as the 1st, 2nd, and 3rd largest cities (p. 460), though Luoyang is supposed to pass 100,000 in 1000 B.C. (p. 541).) (Note: When the city first passed 100,000, suggested by Richard Forstall (pp. 541-542).) | 40,000 | 45,000–50,000 | 55,000–100,000 | 70,000–100,000 | 65,000–100,000 | 200,000 | 200,000 | 100,000–240,000 |
| Marib | Yemen | | | | | 45,000 | | | | |
| Memphis | Egypt | 35,000–100,000 | | 44,000 | | | 65,000 | | 100,000 | |
| Metapontum | Italy | | | | | | | 40,000 | | |
| Miletus | Turkey | | | | | | | | | |
| Niniveh | Iraq | | | 39,000 | 100,000 | 120,000 | | | | |
| Pataliputra / Patna | India | | | | | | | | | 400,000 |
| Populonia | Italy | | | | | | 25,000–40,000 | | | |
| Pyongyang | North Korea | | | | | | | | | |
| Tarquinia | Italy | | | | | | 20,000–40,000 | | | |
| Thebes, Greece | Greece | | | | | | | 30,000–60,000 | | 30,000–60,000 |
| Qufu | China | | | | | | | 100,000 | | 100,000 |
| Rome | Italy | 4,440 | | | | | | 24,400–40,000 | 27,200 | 28,960 |
| Sais | Egypt | | | | | | | | | |
| San Lorenzo Tenochtitlán | Mexico | 13,000 | 13,000 | | | | | | | |
| Shangqiu | China | | | | | | | 100,000 | | 130,000 |
| Sravasti | India | | | | | | | | 46,000 | |
| Sparta | Greece | | | | | | | 40,000–50,000 | | |
| Susa | Iran | 40,000 | | | | | | | | 200,000 |
| Suzhou | China | | | | | | | | | 100,000 |
| Syracuse | Italy | | | | | | | 24,000–40,000 | 24,000–40,000 | 24,000–125,000 |
| Sybaris | Italy | | | | | | | 100,000 | | |
| Taranto | Italy | | | | | | | | | 110,000–150,000 |
| Thebes | Egypt | 50,000–120,000 | 50,000 | | | | | | | |
| Vaisali | India | | | | | | | | | |
| Veii | Italy | | | | | | 25,000–100,000 | | | |
| Volsinii | Italy | | | | | | 13,000–40,000 | | | |
| Vulci | Italy | | | | | | 15,000–40,000 | | | |
| Xiadu | China | | | | | | 100,000 | 100,000 | 320,000 | 300,000 |
| Xintian | China | | | | | | | 100,000 | | |
| Xinzheng | China | | | | | | | | | 100,000 |
| Xue | | | | | | | | | | |
| Yong | China | | | | | | | | | 100,000 |

Table 2: 300 BC-400 AD
| City | Location | 300 BC | 200 BC | 100 BC | AD 1 | AD 100 | AD 200 | AD 300 | AD 361 | AD 400 |
|---|---|---|---|---|---|---|---|---|---|---|
| Alexandria | Egypt | 150,000 | 300,000–600,000 | 400,000 | | 250,000–500,000 | 500,000 | | 125,000–200,000 | |
| Augsburg | Germany | | | | | 25,000–50,000 | 25,000–50,000 | | | |
| Antioch | Turkey | | 120,000 | 400,000 | | 150,000–250,000 | 250,000 | | 150,000 | |
| Anuradhapura | Sri Lanka | | 68,000 | | | 130,000 | | | 72,000 | |
| Anyi | | 100,000 | | | | | | | | |
| Athens | Greece | 25,000 | 10,000 | 10,000 | | 90,000 | 90,000 | | | |
| Autun | France | | | | 40,000–100,000 | 40,000–100,000 | | | | |
| Arles | France | | | | | 10,000 | 10,000 | | | 75,000 |
| Ayodhya | India | | | | | | | | 63,000 | |
| Aquileia | Italy | | | | | 12,000 | 12,000 | | | |
| Carnuntum | Austria | | | | | 12,000–50,000 | 12,000–50,000 | | | |
| Capua | Italy | | 100,000 | 100,000 | | 25,000–40,000 | | | | |
| Carthage | Tunisia | | 150,000–200,000 | | | 100,000–300,000 | 300,000 | | | |
| Chang'an/Xi'an | China | | 100,000–400,000 | 375,000–400,000 | 246,000–500,000 | 81,000–100,000 | 120,000 | 140,000 | 80,000 | 100,000 |
| Chengdu | China | | | | 100,000 | 70,000 | | | | |
| Cổ Loa | Vietnam | | 40,000 | 50,000 | | | | | | |
| Byzantium / Constantinople | Turkey | | | | | | 15,000 | 20,000 | 150,000 | 200,000 |
| Corinth | Greece | | | | | 40,000–100,000 | | | | |
| Cologne | Germany | | | | | 20,000–40,000 | 20,000–40,000 | | | |
| Ctesiphon | Iraq | | | | | | | | 250,000 | |
| Cuicuilco | Mexico | | 36,000 | | | | | | | |
| Datong | China | | | | | | | | | 100,000 |
| El Mirador | Guatemala | | | | 200,000 | | | | | |
| Ephesus | Turkey | | | | | 33,600 | | | | |
| Izapa | Mexico | | 35,000 | | | | | | | |
| Kaushambi | India | 90,000-180,000 | | | | | | | | |
| Kaveri | | | | | | | | | 59,000 | |
| Linzi | China | 125,000–350,000 | 100,000 | 100,000 | 100,000 | | 100,000 | | | |
| London | UK | | | | | 30,000 | 45,000–60,000 | | | |
| Lugdunum | France | | | | | 25,000–50,000 | 25,000–50,000 | | | |
| Luoyang | China | 125,000–240,000 | 60,000 | | 200,000 | 420,000 | | 140,000–250,000 | | 200,000 |
| Mathura | India | | | | | | | | | |
| Milan | Italy | | | | | 30,000–40,000 | | | 100,000 | 25,000–100,000 |
| Monte Albán | Mexico | 5,200 | | 17,200 | 17,200 | 17,200 | 17,200 | | | |
| Nanjing | China | | 56,000 | | | 78,000 | | 100,000 | 150,000 | 300,000 |
| Nimes | France | | | | | | 40,000–60,000 | | | |
| Ostia Antica | Italy | | | | | 25,000–40,000 | 25,000–50,000 | | | |
| Paithan | India | | 60,000 | | | 84,000 | | | | |
| Patala | Pakistan | | | | | 73,000 | | | | |
| Pataliputra | India | | 350,000–400,000 - 1,000,000 | | | 69,000 | | | 250,000 | |
| Peshawar | Pakistan | | | | | 120,000 | | | | |
| Philippi | Greece | | | | 100,000 | | | | | |
| Pingcheng | China | | 88,000 | | | | | | | 200,000 |
| Pozzuoli | Italy | | | | 30,000–50,000 | 30,000–50,000 | | | | |
| Pyay | Myanmar | | | | | | | | 69,000 | |
| Qufu | China | 100,000–125,000 | | | | | | | | |
| Rajgir | India | 100,000 | | | | | | | | |
| Rhodes | Greece | 100,000–200,000 | 100,000 | | | | | | | |
| Rome | Italy | 100,000 | 150,000–160,000 | 400,000 | 1,000,000 | 1,000,000 | 1,000,000 | 800,000 | 800,000 | 800,000 |
| Salona | Croatia | | | | | 25,000 | 25,000 | | | |
| Seleucia | Iraq | | 200,000 | 400,000 | 250,000 (CE 2) | 150,000–250,000 | | | | |
| Shangqiu | China | 100,000 | | | | | | | | |
| Srughna | India | 100,000 | | | | | | | | |
| Suzhou | China | 100,000 | 66,000 | | | 95,000 | | | 58,000 | |
| Syracuse | Italy | 50,000–100,000 | | | | 90,000 | 90,000 | | | |
| Taxila | Pakistan | | 60,000 | | | | | | | |
| Teotihuacán | Mexico | | 60,000–80,000 | | | | | | 90,000 | |
| Thessaloniki | Greece | | | | | 30,000 | 30,000 | | | |
| Tikal | Guatemala | | | | | | | | 100,000 | |
| Tosali | India | | | | | 16,000-47,000 | | | | |
| Tres Zapotes | Mexico | | 30,000 | | | | | | | |
| Trier | Germany | | | | | 10,000 | 10,000–50,000 | 50,000–100,000 | 60,000 | |
| Ujjain | India | 60,000 | 94,000 | | | | | | 80,000 | |
| Vaishali | India | | | | | 28,000-82,000 | | | | |
| Vidisha | India | ~100,000 | | | | | | | | |
| Wanxian | China | | | | 100,000 | | | | | |
| Xiadu | China | 300,000 | | | | | | | | |
| Xianyang | China | 100,000 | 100,000–300,000 | | | | | | | |
| Xinzheng | China | 120,000–125,000 | | | | | | | | |
| Xuchang | China | | | | | | | 140,000 | | |
| Ye | China | | | | | | | 140,000 | 120,000 | 100,000 |

== Middle Ages ==
Early Middle Ages: 500-999 AD
| City | Location | 500 | 600 | 622 | 700 | 775 | 800 | 900 |
|---|---|---|---|---|---|---|---|---|
| Aleppo | Syria | | | 72,000 | | | | |
| Athens | Greece | 110,000 | | | | | | |
| Alexandria | Egypt | | | 94,000–200,000 | 216,000 | | 60,000–100,000 | 60,000–100,000 |
| Angkor | Cambodia | | | | | 80,000 | 100,000 | 90,000–150,000 |
| Anhilpur | India | | | | | | | 80,000 |
| Antioch | Turkey | 150,000 | | | | | | |
| Anuradhapura | Sri Lanka | | | 70,000 | | | | |
| Arles | France | | | | | | 10,000 | |
| Ayodhya | India | 75,000 | | | | | | |
| Badami | India | | | 70,000 | | | | |
| Baghdad | Iraq | | | | | | 175,000 | 150,000 |
| Bakhalal | Mexico | 45,000 | | | | | | |
| Basra | Iraq | | | | | | 100,000 | |
| Benares | India | | | 75,000-210,000 | | | 49,000 | 59,000 |
| Carthage | Tunisia | 100,000 | | | | | | |
| Chang'an / Xi'an | China | 95,000–400,000 | 400,000–600,000 | 400,000 | 1,000,000 | 1,000,000 (Note: Haoqing, the capital of Western Zhou, was located 15 km SW of Chang'an, the capital of Sung and Tang dynasties as well as the present center of Xi'an. Han capital was located 5 km NW of the center of modern Xi'an. All these sites are now within the sub-provincial city of Xi'an.) | 600,000–1,000,000 | 100,000–750,000 |
| Chengdu | China | | | 94,000 | 100,000 | | 100,000 | |
| Chenla | Cambodia | | | 70,000 | | | | |
| Chunar | India | | | | | | | 72,000 |
| Constantinople | Turkey | 400,000–500,000 | 150,000 | 150,000 | 125,000 | 40,000–50,000 | 40,000–50,000 | 150,000 |
| Copán | Honduras | | | | | | 63,000 | |
| Cologne | Germany | | | | | | 15,000–20,000 | 21,000 |
| Córdoba | Spain | | | | | 135,000 | 160,000 | 110,000–175,000 |
| Ctesiphon | Iraq | 400,000 | | 200,000–500,000 | | | | |
| Dali | China | | | | | | | 90,000–100,000 |
| Đại La /Hanoi | Vietnam | | | | | | | 25,000 |
| Datong | China | 200,000 | | | | | | |
| Dorestad | Netherlands | | | | | 1,000–2,500 | 1,000–2,500 | |
| El Pilar | Guatemala | | | | | | | 182,600 |
| El Tajín | Mexico | | | 40,000 | | | 40,000 | 50,000 |
| Fanyang (Youzhou) | China | | | | | | 100,000 | |
| Florence | Italy | | 1,000 | | | 2,000–2,500 | 5,000 | |
| Fustat | Egypt | | | | | | 100,000 | 150,000 |
| Gao | Mali | | | | | | 72,000 | |
| Granada | Spain | | | | | | | 20,000 |
| Guangzhou | China | | | | 200,000 | | 200,000 | |
| Gwalior | India | 65,000 | | | | | | |
| Huari/Wari | Peru | | | | | | 70,000 | |
| Jiankang | China | 500,000 | | | | | | |
| Jinyang (Taiyuan) | China | | | | 100,000 | | 100,000 | |
| Kannauj | India | | | 230,000 | 250,000 | 250,000 | 230,000 | 200,000 |
| Kanchi | India | 56,000 | | 70,000 | | | 51,000 | |
| Kyoto | Japan | | | | | 200,000 | 100,000–200,000 | 200,000 |
| Laon | France | | | | | | | 28,000 |
| Lhasa | China | | | | | | 100,000 | |
| London | UK | | | | | | 10,000–12,000 | |
| Luoyang | China | 200,000–500,000 | 500,000 | 200,000 | 500,000 | | 300,000–400,000 | 150,000–200,000 |
| Lyon | France | | | | | | 12,000 | |
| Madurai | India | | | 70,000 | | | 70,000 | |
| Mainz | Germany | | | | | | 20,000 | 30,000 |
| Mandsaur | India | 63,000 | | | | | | |
| Manyakheta | India | | | | | | | 100,000–200,000 |
| Metz | France | | | | | | 25,000 | 14,000 |
| Milan | Italy | 30,000 | | | | | 25,000 | 30,000 (875) |
| Naples | Italy | | | | | 30,000 | 30,000 | 30,000 |
| Nanjing | China | 150,000–500,000 | | | | | | |
| Nara | Japan | | | | | | 100,000 | |
| Orléans | France | | | | | | 10,000 | |
| Padua | Italy | | | | | | 15,000 | |
| Paris | France | | | | | | 10,000–30,000 | 20,000 |
| Patna / Pataliputra | India | 500,000 | 300,000 | | 100,000 | | 74,000 | |
| Pavia | Italy | | | | | | 15,000–20,000 | |
| Poitiers | France | | 5,000–9,000 | 5,000–9,000 | 5,000–9,000 | 10,000 | 10,000 | |
| Preslav | Bulgaria | | | | | | | 40,000–60,000 |
| Prambanan | Indonesia | | | | | | 60,000 | 62,000 |
| Provins | France | | | | | | 10,000 | |
| Pyay | Myanmar | 73,000 | | 100,000 | | | | |
| Pliska | Bulgaria | | | | | | 34,000 | |
| Ray | Iran | | | 68,000 | | | | |
| Regensburg | Germany | | | | | | 25,000 | 25,000 |
| Reims | France | | | | | | 20,000 | |
| Rennes | France | | | | | | 10,000 | |
| Rome | Italy | 100,000 | 50,000–90,000 | 50,000 | 50,000 | 50,000 | 50,000 | 20,000–30,000 |
| Rouen | France | | | | | | 10,000 | |
| Seville | Spain | 20,000 | 40,000 | | 35,000 | | 35,000 | 40,000–52,000 |
| Sialkot | Pakistan | 85,000 | | | | | | |
| Speyer | Germany | | | | | | 20,000 | |
| Suzhou | China | 70,000 | 120,000 | | 100,000 | | 84,000–100,000 | 81,000–100,000 |
| Teotihuacán | Mexico | 125,000 | | 60,000 | | | | |
| Thessaloniki | Greece | 100,000 | 40,000 | | 40,000 | | 50,000 | 50,000 |
| Tikal | Guatemala | 45,000 | | | | | 40,000 | |
| Toledo | Spain | | | | | | 25,000 | 28,000 |
| Toulouse | France | | | | | | 10,000 | |
| Tours | France | | | | 17,000 | | 20,000 | |
| Tula | Mexico | | | | | | 41,000 | 50,000 |
| Trier | Germany | | | | | 10,000 | 15,000 | 15,000–25,000 |
| Venice | Italy | | | | | | | 37,000 |
| Verona | Italy | | | | | | 30,000 | 25,000 |
| Worms | Germany | | | | | | 10,000 | |
| Wuchang | China | | 100,000 | | | | 84,000 | |
| Ye | China | 200,000 | | | | | | |

Later Middle Ages: 1000–1399
| City | Location | 1000 | 1100 | 1150 | 1200 | 1250 | 1300 | 1350 |
|---|---|---|---|---|---|---|---|---|
| Angkor | Cambodia | 200,000; 400,000 | 125,000; 550,000 | 140,000; 600,000 | 150,000; 650,000 | 650,000 | | |
| Amalfi | Italy | 35,000–80,000 | | | | | 10,000–15,000 | |
| Ani | Turkey | 100,000–200,000 | | | | | | |
| Anhilpur | India | 100,000 | 100,000 | 135,000 | | | | |
| Antioch | Turkey | | | 40,000 | 40,000 | | | |
| L'Aquila | Italy | | | | | | 40,000 | |
| Bagan | Myanmar | | 100,000 | 150,000 | 180,000 | 180,000 | | |
| Baghdad | Iraq | 125,000 | 150,000 | | 250,000 | 150,000 | | |
| Beijing | China | | | | 130,000 | 140,000 | 401,000 | 400,000 |
| Berlin | Germany | | | | 2,400 | 1,200–2,000 | 4,000–7,000 | |
| Bologna | Italy | | | | | 50,000 | 50,000 | 23,000 |
| Braunschweig | Germany | 10,000 | | | 21,000 | | | |
| Bruges | Belgium | 12,000 | 15,000 | | 25,000 | 36,000 | 50,000 | |
| Cahokia | United States | | 10,200–15,300 | 25,000 | | | | |
| Cairo | Egypt | 135,000 | 150,000 | 175,000 | 200,000–250,000 | 300,000 | 400,000 | 350,000 |
| Chang'an / Xi'an | China | | | | | | 118,000 | 114,000 |
| Chartres | France | | | | 7,000 | | | |
| Chunar | India | 66,000 | | | | | | |
| Cologne | Germany | 21,000 | 25,000–35,000 | | 32,000–60,000 | 52,000–60,000 | 40,000–60,000 | 57,000 (1333) |
| Constantinople | Turkey | 150,000 | 200,000–250,000 | 200,000 | 150,000–250,000 | 100,000 | 150,000 | 80,000 |
| Córdoba | Spain | 110,000 | 60,000 (1103) | 60,000 | 60,000 | | 40,000 | |
| Cuttack | India | | | | | 100,000 | 90,000 | 90,000 |
| Dali | China | 90,000; 100,000 | 100,000 | | | | | |
| Delhi | India | | 10,000 | | 60,000 | 80,000 | 100,000 | 125,000 |
| Dhar | India | | 80,000 | | | | | |
| Dwarasamudra | India | 30,000 | | | | 120,000 | 150,000 | |
| Edessa | Turkey | | 25,000 | | | | | |
| Erfurt | Germany | 10,000 | | | 21,000 | | 32,000 | |
| Fanyang (Youzhou) | China | 100,000 | | | | | | |
| Fes | Morocco | 75,000 | 125,000 | 160,000 | 200,000–250,000 | 200,000 | 150,000–200,000 | 125,000 |
| Florence | Italy | 13,000 | 20,000 | | 30,000 | 50,000–110,000 | 60,000–120,000 | 40,000 |
| Gangaikonda Cholapuram | India | 200,000 | 300,000 | 300,000 | 250,000 | 150,000 | | |
| Gaur | India | | | | 60,000 | 90,000 | 100,000 | |
| Genoa | Italy | 15,000–80,000 | | | 30,000 | 100,000 | 100,000 | |
| Ghent | Belgium | 8,000 | 12,000 | | 25,000 | 65,000 | 42,000–65,000 | 57,000 |
| Guangzhou | China | | | | | 140,000 | 150,000 | 150,000 |
| Hangzhou | China | 80,000 | 90,000 | 145,000–800,000 | 255,000–1,000,000 | 320,000–1,000,000 | 432,000–800,000 | 432,000 |
| Ile-Ife | Nigeria | | | | | | | 75,000–105,000 |
| Jinzhou | China | 85,000 | | | | | | |
| Kaifeng | China | 400,000–1,000,000 | 442,000–1,000,000 | 150,000 | | 1,000,000 | | |
| Kalburgi | India | | | | | | | 70,000 |
| Kalyan | India | | 150,000 | 125,000 | | | | |
| Kannauj | India | 72,000 | 80,000 | 92,000 | | | | |
| Khajuraho (Kalinjar) | India | 100,000 | | | 50,000 | | | |
| Khambhat | India | | | | 50,000 | 60,000 | | |
| Kyiv | Ukraine | 45,000 | 48,000–100,000 | | 36,000–50,000 | | | |
| Kollam | India | | | | | | | 60,000 |
| Kyoto | Japan | 175,000–300,000 | | | | | | |
| Laon | France | 25,000 | | | | | | |
| London | UK | 20,000–25,000 | 10,000–20,000 | | 20,000–30,000 | | 80,000–100,000 | 25,000–50,000 |
| Lübeck | Germany | | | | 6,000 | | | 18,800 |
| Madurai | India | | | | | | 60,000 | |
| Mainz | Germany | 30,000 | 30,000 | 25,000 | 25,000 | 25,000 | 24,000 | |
| Manyakheta | India | 71,000 | | | | | | |
| Marrakesh | Morocco | | 150,000 | 150,000 | 150,000 | 125,000 | | |
| Marseille | France | 6,000–7,000 | | | 25,000 | | 40,000 | |
| Merv | Turkmenistan | | | 200,000 | 70,000 | | | |
| Metz | France | 16,000 | 21,000 | | 23,000–27,000 | | 32,000 | |
| Milan | Italy | 15,000 | 45,000 | 58,000 (1170) | 60,000–100,000 | 150,000 | 150,000–200,000 | 50,000–200,000 |
| Montpellier | France | | | | | | 40,000–50,000 | |
| Nabadwip | India | | | 85,000 | | | | |
| Nanjing | China | | | 130,000 | 130,000 | 130,000 | 95,000 | |
| Naples | Italy | 30,000 | 30,000 | 30,000 | 30,000 | 30,000–36,000 (1278) | 40,000–100,000 | 60,000 (1340) |
| Nishapur | Iran | 125,000 | | | | | | |
| Norwich | UK | | | | | | 20,000–25,000 | |
| Padua | Italy | | | 15,000 | | | 35,000 | |
| Palermo | Italy | 60,000–75,000 | | 150,000 | 150,000 | 50,000 (1277) | 40,000–100,000 | |
| Paris | France | 20,000 | 50,000–65,000 | | 110,000 | 160,000 | 200,000–270,000 (1328) | 215,000 |
| Polonnaruwa | Sri Lanka | | | | 75,000 | | | |
| Prague | Czech Republic | 10,000 | | | 22,000 | | 40,000 | 50,000 |
| Puri | India | | | 78,000 | 72,000 | | | |
| Ramavati | | | 75,000 | | | | | |
| Regensburg | Germany | 40,000 | 30,000 | | | | | |
| Rome | Italy | 35,000 | 30,000–40,000 | 30,000–40,000 | 40,000 | | 40,000–50,000 | 15,000–17,000 |
| Rouen | France | 20,000 | 20,000 | | 30,000–40,000 | 50,000 | 40,000–50,000 | |
| Salerno | Italy | 50,000 | 50,000 | 50,000 | | | 10,000 (1320) | |
| Sarai | Russia | | | | | | | 120,000 |
| Seville | Spain | 52,000 | | | | | 40,000–50,000 | |
| Shangjing | China | 140,000 | | | | | | |
| Speyer | Germany | 25,000 | 30,000 | 30,000 | 30,000 | 30,000 | 25,000 | |
| Suzhou | China | 100,000 | | | | | | 96,000 |
| Tabriz | Iran | | | | | | 125,000 | 100,000 |
| Thanjavur | India | 200,000 | 250,000 | 200,000 | | | | |
| Thăng Long/Hanoi | Vietnam | | 30,000 | | | | 40,000 | |
| Thessaloniki | Greece | 40,000 | 40,000 | 40,000 | 30,000 | | 50,000–100,000 | 50,000–150,000 |
| Toledo | Spain | 37,000 | | | 35,000 | | 42,000 | |
| Toulouse | France | | | | | | 35,000 | |
| Trier | Germany | 20,000 | 20,000 | 20,000 | 25,000 | | | |
| Venice | Italy | 45,000–60,000 | 58,000 | 64,000–70,000 | 70,000–80,000 | 45,000 | 100,000–120,000 | 65,228 (1363) |
| Veliky Novgorod | Russia | 10,000–18,000 | | | 20,000–40,000 | | 50,000 | |
| Verona | Italy | 10,000 | | | 20,000–25,000 | 20,000–25,000 | 35,000–40,000 | |
| Vijayanagar | India | | | | | | | 200,000 |
| Warangal | India | | | | | 63,000 | 80,000 | |
| Worms | Germany | 20,000 | | | 28,000 | 25,000 | 20,000 | |
| York | UK | | 8,000 | | | | 23,000 | |
| Ypres | Belgium | | | | | 40,000–200,000 | 30,000 | |

== Early Modern era ==
Renaissance: 1400–1599
| City | 1400 | 1450 | 1500 | 1550 | 1575 |
|---|---|---|---|---|---|
| Aachen | | | 15,000 | | |
| Adrianople / Edirne | 28,000 | 85,000 | 125,000 | 160,000 | 183,000 |
| Agra | | | | 250,000 | 500,000 |
| Ahmedabad | | 70,000 | 80,000–100,000 | 140,000–175,000 | 300,000 |
| Ahmednagar | | | | 70,000 | |
| Alessandria | | | | 8,000 | |
| Antwerp | 18,000 (1374) | 20,000 (1444) | 40,000 | 90,000 | 104,984 (1568) |
| Asti | | | | 8,000 | |
| Augsburg | 14,000 (1408) | 17,000 (1471) | 20,000 | 45,000 | |
| Ayutthaya | | | 150,000 | 150,000 | 10,000 (1569) |
| Bago | | | | 150,000 | 175,000 |
| Beijing | 150,000 | 600,000 | 672,000 | 690,000 | 706,000 |
| Bologna | 40,000 | | 55,000 | 61,731 (1569) | 72,395 (1588) |
| Brescia | 27,000 | 30,000 (1440) | 49,000 | 41,000 | |
| Bursa | 95,000 | 130,000 | | | |
| Bruges | 37,000 | 25,000 | 30,000 | 35,000 | 29,000 (1584) |
| Cairo | 125,000–360,000 | 380,000 | 400,000 | 360,000 | 275,000 |
| Chan Chan | | 60,000–100,000 | | | 5,000–10,000 |
| Chang'an / Xi'an | 150,000 | 150,000 | 127,000 | 150,000 | |
| Cologne | 40,000 | | 30,000 | 35,000 | 37,000 |
| Como | | | 10,000 | 10,000 | |
| Constantinople / Istanbul | 75,000 | 40,000–50,000 | 200,000 | 660,000 | 680,000 |
| Crema | | | | 11,000 | |
| Cremona | 35,000 | | 40,000 | 34,000 | |
| Cuneo | | | | 6,000 | |
| Cuttack | 75,000 | 100,000 | 140,000 | 90,000 | |
| Cusco | | | 45,000 | | |
| Delhi | | | 80,000–100,000 | 160,000 | 160,000 |
| Fez | 125,000 | 150,000 | 130,000 | | |
| Florence | 45,000–61,000 | 54,000 (1470) | 55,000–70,000 | 59,216 (1562) | |
| Fossano | | | | 9,000 | |
| Gao | | | 60,000 | | |
| Gaur | | 150,000 | 200,000 | | |
| Ghent | 70,000 | | 40,000 | 50,000 | |
| Genoa | 80,000–100,000 | 120,000 (1460) | 60,000 | 65,000 | |
| Granada | 100,000 | 165,000 | 70,000 | | |
| Guangzhou | 150,000 | 175,000 | 150,000 | 160,000 | 170,000 |
| Gwalior | | | | 80,000 | |
| Hangzhou | 235,000 | 250,000 | 250,000 | 260,000 | 260,000 |
| Hanoi | | | 50,000 | | |
| Jaunpur | | 100,000 | | | |
| Kalburgi | 90,000 | | | | |
| Kano | | | 50,000 | | |
| Khambhat | 60,000 | | | | |
| Kollam | 60,000 | | | | |
| Lodi | | | | 9,000 | |
| London | 45,000 | 75,000 | 40,000 | 80,000 | |
| Lyon | 20,000–35,000 | 60,000 | 50,000 | 70,000 | |
| Lübeck | 17,200 | 21,568 | 25,444 | 22,452 | |
| Magdeburg | 20,000 | 24,000 | 18,000 | 40,000 | |
| Mandu | | 70,000 | | | |
| Mantua | | | 28,000 | 38,000 | |
| Milan | 125,000 | 110,000 | 100,000 | 69,000 | 115,000 (1574) |
| Modena | | | 18,000 | 16,000 | |
| Nanjing | 487,000 | 150,000 | 157,000 | 182,000 | 188,000 |
| Naples | 40,000–100,000 | 60,000 (1435) | 125,000–150,000 | 212,000 | 215,000 |
| Novara | | | | 7,000 | |
| Nuremberg | 18,000 | 25,982 (1449) | 36,000 | 40,000 | |
| Oyo-Ile | | 150,000 | 60,000 | | |
| Padua | | | 27,000 | 32,000 | |
| Paris | 100,000 (1422) | 150,000 | 100,000 | 130,000 | 220,000 |
| Parma | | | 19,000 | 25,000 | |
| Pavia | | | 16,000 | 13,000 | |
| Piacenza | | | | 27,000 | |
| Prague | 40,000 | | 30,000 | | |
| Rome | 33,000 | 33,500 (1458) | 38,000–55,000 | 45,000 | 80,000 (1580) |
| Rouen | | | 40,000 | 65,000 | |
| Samarkand | 130,000 | | | | |
| Seoul | 100,000 | 125,000 | 150,000 | | 125,000 |
| Seville | 15,000 (1384) | | 60,000 | 65,000 | 109,000 (1565) |
| Suzhou | 129,000 | | | | |
| Tabriz | 150,000 | 200,000 | 250,000 | | |
| Tenochtitlan/Mexico City | | | 200,000-400,000 | 60,000 | |
| Texcoco | | | 60,000 | | |
| Venice | 85,000–200,000 | 150,000 (1423) | 100,000 | 158,000 | 134,871 (1581) |
| Verona | 14,800 | | 38,000 | 52,000 | |
| Vijayanagar | 400,000 | 550,000 | 500,000 - 1,000,000 | | |

=== 17th to 19th century ===
| City | 1600 | 1650 | 1700 | 1750 | 1800 | 1825 | 1850 | 1875 |
|---|---|---|---|---|---|---|---|---|
| Aachen | 14,171 (1601) | 12,000 | 15,000 | | 24,000 | 35,428 | 56,190 (1849) | 79,606 |
| Adrianople/Edirne | 160,000 | 132,000 | 93,000 | 96,000 | 100,000 | 125,000 | 85,000 | |
| Alexandria | | | 15,000 (1693) | 6,000 (1777) | 4,000 (1798) | 12,528 (1828) | 138,000 | 212,000 |
| Antwerp | 47,000 | 70,000 | 70,000 | 46,000 | 60,000 | | 88,000 | 127,000 |
| Agra | 500,000 | 660,000 | | | 60,000 | | 108,000 | 149,008 (1872) |
| Ahmedabad | 300,000 | 380,000 | 400,000 | 120,000 | 89,000 | 87,000 (1824) | 94,390 (1846) | 116,873 (1872) |
| Amsterdam | 59,551 | 176,873 | 235,224 | 233,952 | 203,485 | 197,231 (1820) | 223,700 | 289,000 |
| Augsburg | 48,000 | 21,000 | 21,000 | 31,000 | 28,000 | | 35,000 | 57,210 |
| Ayutthaya | 100,000 | 125,000 | 150,000 | 150,000 | | | 30,000 | |
| Baltimore | | | | | 26,514 | 80,620 (1830) | 169,054 | 299,000 |
| Barcelona | 64,000 | 64,000 | 73,000 | 70,000 | 120,000 | 120,000 | 167,000 | 240,000 |
| Beijing | 706,000 | 470,000 | 650,000 | 900,000 | 1,100,000 | 1,350,000 | 1,648,000 | 1,310,000 |
| Berlin | 25,000 | 12,000 | 55,000 | 113,289 | 172,132 | 220,277 | 446,000 | 1,045,000 |
| Birmingham | 2,000 | 4,000 | 7,000 | 23,688 | 73,670 (1801) | 122,000 | 294,000 | 480,000 |
| Bombay | | | | 100,000 | | 163,000 (1826) | | 718,000 |
| Bordeaux | 40,000 | 40,000 | 50,000 | 67,000 | 88,000 | | 142,000 | 225,000 |
| Boston | | | 6,700 | 20,000 | 35,248 | 61,392 (1830) | 202,261 | 450,000 |
| Breslau (Wrocław) | 33,000–40,000 | 37,000 | 40,000 | 52,000 | 64,520 | 89,500 (1831) | 114,000 | 239,050 |
| Bristol | 10,549 | 15,000-20,000 | 25,000 | 43,275 | 62,452 | 94,180 | 137,528 | 206,874 (1881) |
| Brussels | 55,000 | 70,000 | 70,000 | 55,000–60,000 | 66,297 | | 208,000–251,000 | 327,000 |
| Bucharest | 60,000 | | 50,000 | 25,000 | 34,000 | | 104,000 | 177,646 (1878) |
| Budapest | 25,000 | | | 24,000 | 54,000 | | 156,506 | 325,000 |
| Cairo | 200,000 | 350,000 | 350,000 | 300,000 | 210,960 | 257,783 | 267,160 | 345,028 |
| Calcutta | | | | 200,000 | | 230,000 (1822) | | 680,000 |
| Chicago | | | | | | 100 (1830) | 29,963 | 405,000 |
| Cologne | 40,000 | 45,000 | 42,000 | 43,000 | 42,000 | 59,049 | 94,781 (1849) | 135,371 |
| Copenhagen | 40,000 | 29,000 | 62,000 | 93,000 | 101,000 | 108,000 | 150,000 | 241,000 |
| Danzig | 50,000 | 70,000 | 50,000 | 46,000 | 40,000 | 61,900 | 65,000 | 90,500 (1874) |
| Delhi | | 200,000 | 500,000 | 100,000 | 125,000 | 150,000 | 156,000 | 154,417 (1872) |
| Dhaka | 200,000 | 200,000 | 200,000 | 135,000 | 110,000 | 66,989 (1830) | 60,617 | 51,536 (1869) |
| Dresden | 14,793 (1603) | 16,000 (1648) | 21,298 (1699) | 63,209 (1755) | 61,794 | 61,886 (1830) | 94,092 (1849) | 197,295 |
| Dublin | 5,000 | 17,000 | 60,000–80,000 | 90,000–128,570 (1753) | 167,899 (1802) | 194,000 | 263,000 | 310,000 |
| Edinburgh | | | 35,000 | 55,000 | 82,000 | 145,000 | 194,000 | 274,000 |
| Edo (Tokyo) | 60,000 | 430,000 | 688,000 | 509,000 | 685,000 | 530,000 | 567,000 | 780,000 |
| Esfahān | 125,000 | 350,000 | 350,000 | 60,000 | 50,000 | | 60,000 | 76,088 (1870) |
| Genoa | 71,000 | 90,000 | 80,000 | 87,000 | 91,000 | 83,569 (1822) | 100,696 | 130,269 (1872) |
| Glasgow | 7,000 | 14,000 | 14,000 | 23,500 | 77,000 | 170,000 | 346,000 | 635,000 |
| Guangzhou | 180,000 | 200,000 | 200,000 | 400,000 | 800,000 | 900,000 | 875,000 | 944,000 |
| Hangzhou | 270,000 | 281,000 | 303,000 | 340,000 | 387,000 | 410,000 | 700,000 | 50,000 (1864) |
| Hanoi | 40,000 | 100,000 | 100,000 | | 75,000 | 81,000 | 51,000 | 255,000 |
| Huế | | | | | | 60,000 | | 50,325 |
| Ho Chi Minh City/Saigon | | 24,000 | | | | 50,000 | 50,000 | 180,661 (1902) |
| Hyderabad | 80,000 | 90,000 | 200,000 | 225,000 | 200,000 | 200,000 | 200,000 | 350,000 |
| Iași (Jassy) | | | | 20,000 | 20,000 | | 50,000 | 72,000 (1877) |
| Constantinople/Istanbul | 400,000–700,000 | 700,000 | 600,000–700,000 | 625,000 | 570,000 | 675,000 | 785,000 | 827,750 (1874) |
| Hamburg | 40,000 | 75,000 | 70,000 | 75,000–90,000 | 130,000 | 124,838 (1830) | 193,000 | 348,000 |
| Kagoshima | | 50,000 | 51,000 | 57,000 | 67,000 | 72,350 | 72,000 | 89,374 (1873) |
| Kanazawa | 50,000 | 55,106 | 67,000 | 78,000 | 97,000 | 103,000 | 116,000 | 109,685 (1873) |
| Kyoto | 300,000 | 350,000 | 350,000 | 362,000 | 377,000 | 350,000 | 323,000 | 238,663 (1873) |
| Königsberg | | 40,000 (1663) | 40,600 (1708) | 60,000 | 59,000 | 67,125 | 79,887 (1852) | 122,636 |
| Lahore | 350,000 | 200,000 | | | | | 94,000 | 99,000 (1872) |
| Leipzig | 20,000 | 14,000 (1648) | 15,653 (1699) | 35,000 | 32,146 | 41,506 | 62,374 (1849) | 209,000 |
| Lisbon | 110,000 | 165,000 (1639) | 188,000 | 148,000–213,000 | 180,000–237,000 | 249,000 | 240,000–259,000 | 235,000 (1870) |
| Liverpool | | | 5,714 | 22,000 | 77,653 (1801) | 170,000 | 375,955 (1851) | 650,000 |
| London | 200,000 | 400,000 | 575,000 | 675,000 | 865,000 | 1,335,000 | 2,320,000 | 4,241,000 |
| Lyon | 40,000 | 75,000 | 97,000 | 114,000 | 102,167 (1793) | 115,841 (1820) | 254,000 | 331,000 |
| Lübeck | 22,570 | 31,068 | 19,978 | 17,644 | 24,631 | 25,600 | 26,098 | 44,799 |
| Madras | | 15,000 | | 55,000 | 125,000 | 172,000 | 310,000 | 400,000 |
| Madrid | 49,000 | 130,000 | 110,000 | 109,000 | 167,000 | 181,400 (1826) | 263,000 | 407,000 |
| Manchester | | 5,000 | 9,000 | 18,000 | 70,000 | 155,000 | 412,000 | 590,000 |
| Marseille | 40,000 | 66,000 | 75,000 | 68,000 | 78,000 | 119,000 | 193,000 | 316,000 |
| Mexico City | 75,000 | 90,000 | 100,000 | 110,000 | 128,000 | 176,000 | 170,000 | 250,000 |
| Milan | 120,000 | 100,000 | 124,000 | 123,618 | 134,528 | 168,000 | 193,000 | 277,000 |
| Moscow | 80,000 | 200,000 (1638) | 130,000 | 130,000–161,000 | 238,000 | 241,500 | 373,800 | 601,969 (1871) |
| Munich | 20,000 | 10,000 | 21,000 | 32,000 | 34,000 | 62,290 | 96,398 | 198,000 |
| Nagoya | 65,000 | | 65,000 | 96,000 | 92,000 | | 116,000 | 125,193 (1873) |
| Nanjing | 194,000 | 178,000 | 300,000 | 285,000 | 220,000 | 200,000 | 300,000 | |
| Naples | 400,000 | 176,000 | 216,000 | 305,000 | 427,000 | 350,000 | 413,000–416,000 | 450,000 |
| New Orleans | | | | | 8,056 | 46,082 (1830) | 116,375 | 210,000 |
| New York City | | | 4,436 (1703) | 13,296 (1749) | 63,000 | 170,000 | 682,000 | 1,900,000 |
| Nuremberg | 40,000 | 25,000 | 40,000 | 30,000 | 27,000 | | 54,000 | 91,017 |
| Osaka | 200,000–360,000 | 220,000 | 350,000–380,000 | 400,000 (1749) | 383,000–500,000 (1783) | 340,000 | 300,000 | 320,000 |
| Palermo | 105,000 | 128,000 | 100,000 | 118,000 | 139,000 | 168,000 | 182,000 | 219,000 |
| Paris | 220,000 | 430,000 | 510,000 | 576,000 | 581,000 | 855,000 | 1,314,000 | 2,250,000 |
| Philadelphia | | | 4,400 | 14,563 (1753) | 68,200 | 138,000 | 426,221 | 791,000 |
| Prague | 60,000 | 25,000 | 39,000 | 58,000 | 77,403 | 98,000 | 117,000 | 223,371 (1869) |
| Rio de Janeiro | | | 20,000 | 29,000 | 44,000 | | 166,419 | 274,000 |
| Rome | 105,000 | 124,000 | 138,000 | 156,000 | 163,000 | 138,000 | 170,000 | 252,000 |
| Rouen | 60,000 | 82,000 | 64,000 | 67,000 | 81,000 | 92,083 (1836) | 104,142 (1851) | 104,902 (1876) |
| Saint Petersburg | | | | 138,000 | 220,200 | 438,000 | 502,000 | 764,000 |
| Seoul | | 150,000 | 158,000 | 187,000 | 190,000 | 192,000 | 194,000 | |
| Seville | 121,000 (1597) | 65,000 | 96,000 | 66,000 | 96,000 | 75,000 (1820) | 106,000 | 133,247 (1877) |
| Shanghai | | | 45,000 | 60,000 | 100,000 | 115,000 | 250,000 | 400,000 |
| Sunpu | 100,000 | | | | | | | 31,555 (1873) |
| St. Louis | | | | | 925 (1799) | 4,977 (1830) | 77,860 | 338,000 |
| Suzhou | 175,000 | 145,000 | 245,000 | 302,000 | 243,000 | 302,000 | 550,000 | 250,000 |
| Turin | 24,000 | 37,000 | 42,000 | 57,000 | 82,000 | 109,000 | 138,000 | 216,000 |
| Warsaw | 35,000 | | 21,000 | 28,000 | 75,000 | 124,000 | 163,000 | 311,000 |
| Venice | 139,000 | 120,000 | 138,000 | 149,000 | 138,000 | 109,927 | 106,000 | 129,676 |
| Vienna | 50,000 | 60,000 | 114,000 | 175,400 | 231,000 | 401,200 | 551,300 | 1,020,770 |
| Xi'an | 138,000 | 147,000 | 167,000 | 195,000 | 224,000 | 259,000 | 275,000 | 250,000 |
| Yamaguchi | 80,000 | | | | | | | |

== 20th Century ==
| City | 1950 | 1960 | 1970 | 1980 | 1990 | 2000 |
|---|---|---|---|---|---|---|
| Algiers | 516,000 | 872,000 | 1,281,000 | 1,621,000 | 1,797,000 | 2,141,000 |
| Baghdad | 579,000 | 1,019,000 | 2,070,000 | 3,145,000 | 4,092,000 | 5,200,000 |
| Bangkok | 1,360,000 | 2,151,000 | 3,110,000 | 4,723,000 | 5,889,000 | 6,395,000 |
| Barcelona | 1,809,000 | 2,468,000 | 3,482,000 | 3,837,000 | 4,101,000 | 4,355,000 |
| Beijing | 1,671,365 | 3,900,441 | 4,426,045 | 5,366,372 | 6,787,737 | 10,285,091 |
| Berlin | 3,338,000 | 3,260,000 | 3,206,000 | 3,056,000 | 3,422,000 | 3,384,000 |
| Bogotá | 630,315 | 1,268,645 | 2,383,425 | 3,525,154 | 4,740,448 | 6,329,384 |
| Brussels | 1,415,000 | 1,485,000 | 1,568,000 | 1,654,000 | 1,695,000 | 1,783,000 |
| Buenos Aires | 5,166,140 | 6,761,837 | 8,416,170 | 9,919,781 | 11,147,566 | 12,503,871 |
| Cairo | 2,493,514 | 3,680,160 | 5,584,507 | 7,348,778 | 9,892,143 | 13,625,565 |
| Caracas | 694,000 | 1,316,000 | 2,060,000 | 2,575,000 | 2,767,000 | 2,864,000 |
| Casablanca | 625,000 | 967,000 | 1,505,000 | 2,109,000 | 2,682,000 | 3,134,000 |
| Chicago | 4,999,000 | 6,183,000 | 7,106,000 | 7,216,000 | 7,374,000 | 8,315,000 |
| Delhi | 1,369,369 | 2,282,962 | 3,530,693 | 5,587,014 | 9,384,209 | 15,691,899 |
| Dhaka | 335,760 | 507,920 | 1,373,718 | 3,265,663 | 6,620,697 | 10,284,947 |
| Hong Kong | 1,980,524 | 3,114,671 | 3,955,072 | 4,978,544 | 5,838,574 | 6,731,195 |
| Istanbul | 967,497 | 1,453,353 | 2,772,095 | 4,397,037 | 6,552,160 | 8,743,868 |
| Jakarta | 1,452,000 | 2,678,740 | 3,915,406 | 5,984,256 | 8,174,756 | 8,389,759 |
| Johannesburg | 911,000 | 1,148,000 | 1,443,000 | 1,555,000 | 1,879,000 | 3,046,000 |
| Karachi | 1,055,380 | 1,853,325 | 3,118,723 | 5,047,815 | 7,147,064 | 9,825,295 |
| Kinshasa (from 1881 to 1966, Léopoldville) | 201,905 | 442,853 | 1,069,714 | 2,052,874 | 3,683,274 | 6,140,419 |
| Kolkata | 4,604,143 | 5,910,210 | 7,329,372 | 9,100,166 | 10,974,177 | 13,097,153 |
| Lagos | 325,218 | 762,418 | 1,413,528 | 2,572,218 | 4,764,093 | 7,280,706 |
| London | 8,361,000 | 8,196,000 | 7,509,000 | 6,751,000 | 6,794,000 | 7,273,000 |
| Los Angeles-Long Beach-Santa Ana | 4,045,514 | 6,529,638 | 8,377,684 | 9,511,568 | 10,883,429 | 11,798,345 |
| Madrid | 1,700,000 | 2,392,000 | 3,521,000 | 4,253,000 | 4,414,000 | 5,014,000 |
| Manila | 1,543,666 | 2,273,734 | 3,534,309 | 5,954,719 | 7,972,799 | 9,957,962 |
| Melbourne | 1,332,000 | 1,851,000 | 2,499,000 | 2,839,000 | 3,154,000 | 3,361,000 |
| Mexico City | 3,365,081 | 5,479,184 | 8,830,947 | 13,027,620 | 15,642,318 | 18,457,028 |
| Miami | 622,000 | 1,361,000 | 2,141,000 | 3,122,000 | 3,969,000 | 4,933,000 |
| Milan | 1,883,000 | 2,395,000 | 3,017,000 | 3,168,000 | 3,063,000 | 2,985,000 |
| Montreal | 1,343,000 | 2,031,000 | 2,684,000 | 2,824,000 | 3,154,000 | 3,429,000 |
| Moscow | 5,356,392 | 6,169,961 | 7,106,457 | 8,136,141 | 8,986,631 | 10,004,523 |
| Mumbai | 3,088,811 | 4,414,904 | 6,412,876 | 9,199,543 | 12,355,090 | 16,146,526 |
| Munich | 831,000 | 1,060,000 | 1,294,000 | 1,299,000 | 1,218,000 | 1,202,000 |
| New York-Newark | 12,338,471 | 14,163,521 | 16,191,179 | 15,601,401 | 16,085,600 | 17,813,372 |
| Osaka | 7,005,284 | 10,614,841 | 15,271,510 | 17,027,548 | 18,388,782 | 18,660,022 |
| Paris | 6,283,018 | 7,410,735 | 8,208,121 | 8,669,349 | 9,330,327 | 9,736,538 |
| Rio de Janeiro | 3,026,195 | 4,493,182 | 6,790,519 | 8,783,870 | 9,697,487 | 11,306,768 |
| Rome | 1,884,000 | 2,456,000 | 3,135,000 | 3,390,000 | 3,714,000 | 3,708,000 |
| Saint Petersburg (from 1924 to 1991, Leningrad) | 2,903,000 | 3,398,000 | 3,980,000 | 4,645,000 | 4,989,000 | 4,719,000 |
| Santiago de Chile | 1,322,000 | 1,980,000 | 2,647,000 | 3,721,000 | 4,616,000 | 5,658,000 |
| São Paulo | 2,334,038 | 3,969,759 | 7,620,490 | 12,089,454 | 14,775,840 | 17,014,078 |
| Seoul | 1,021,000 | 2,361,000 | 5,312,000 | 8,244,000 | 10,518,000 | 9,879,000 |
| Shanghai | 4,288,091 | 6,865,312 | 6,052,468 | 5,927,898 | 8,605,812 | 14,246,541 |
| Singapore | 1,006,701 | 1,601,079 | 2,061,831 | 2,400,729 | 3,022,209 | 4,053,602 |
| Sydney | 1,690,000 | 2,135,000 | 2,892,000 | 3,252,000 | 3,632,000 | 3,780,000 |
| Taipei | 551,000 | 880,000 | 1,406,000 | 2,247,000 | 2,737,000 | 2,642,000 |
| Tehran | 1,041,000 | 1,873,000 | 3,290,000 | 5,079,000 | 6,365,000 | 7,128,000 |
| Tokyo | 11,274,641 | 16,678,822 | 23,297,502 | 28,548,512 | 32,530,002 | 34,449,908 |
| Washington, D.C. | 1,298,000 | 1,823,000 | 2,488,000 | 2,777,000 | 3,376,000 | 3,949,000 |

== See also ==
- List of largest cities throughout history (7000 BC – AD 2000)
- List of largest cities, present day
- Estimates of historical world population
