= List of historic reserves in Ukraine =

Historic and cultural reserves (Ukrainian: історико-культурні заповідники, romanized: istoryko-kulturni zapovidnyky) are defined under Ukrainian law as ensembles and complexes of monuments (landmarks) that collectively possess cultural, historic, or scientific value, and are thus placed under the protection of the state. Such a reserve may be limited to a single populated place or region. Historic reserves can be designated as historic and architectural, architectural and historic, historic and memorial, historic and archaeological, or historic and ethnographic depending on the dominant type of monuments that make up the reserve. Some historic reserves are officially listed by the Ministry of Culture and usually known as national. However, there are other historic reserves that are established by regional state administrations and other bodies. The designation of a territory as a historic reserve entails bans or restrictions on industrial and agricultural activities within its boundaries. Its administration is responsible for the preservation, conservation, and restoration of the area, ensuring its proper use, and carrying out educational, tourism, archival, and research activities. Historic and cultural reserves are not to be confused with nature reserves, which protect natural rather than historic areas.

This list includes museum-reserves (museums that were also designated as historic and cultural reserves) that are directly subordinated to the Ministry of Culture or to the regional state administrations. However, it excludes other entities also referred to as museum-reserves, notably those managed by Borys Voznytsky Lviv National Art Gallery. (Note: Museum of the Hetman of Ukraine Ivan Vyhovsky, Museum of Markiian Shashkevych, Museum of Rusalka Dnistrova, Olesko Castle, Piatnychany Tower, Pidhirtsi Castle, Zhovkva Castle, and Zolochiv Castle) Similar institutions that are not officially designated as reserves are likewise excluded, such as the Historic and Archaeological Museum Complex "Ancient Liubech", the Cultural and Archaeological Center "Peresopnytsia", and the Historic and Cultural Complex "Radomysl Castle-Museum".

As of 2026, there are 68 historic and cultural reserves in Ukraine, one of which (located in Lviv's Old Town) is de facto not functioning. Shevchenko National Reserve in Kaniv, established in 1925, is the oldest, while Ancient Zvenyhorod, created in 2020, is the most recently established reserve. Cherkasy and Lviv oblasts (regions) each have the highest number of active reserves, at eight. There are no reserves in Dnipropetrovsk, Kherson, Luhansk, Odesa, Zakarpattia, and Zhytomyr oblasts.

== Background ==
The idea of protected historic areas in Ukraine dates back to the period following the Russian Revolution, when the Ukrainian People's Republic designated the grave of Taras Shevchenko – the country's national poet – as a national sanctuary in 1918. The same site was declared a state reserve in 1925 under the Soviet Union and additional historic and cultural reserves were established in the following years. The Soviet government also distinguished between reserves of republican and local significance, which were managed by the Ukrainian Soviet Socialist Republic and local governments, respectively. In the 1930s, most existing reserves were liquidated and proposals for new ones were rejected, with Stalinist repressions also affecting the reserves' workers. The creation of new reserves resumed after World War II but gained momentum only in the 1970s–1980s, when the approach shifted toward preserving entire historic ensembles rather than individual monuments. Another wave of reserve establishment occurred in the years following Ukraine's declaration of independence in 1991, and slowed after 2010. Nevertheless, they currently face multiple organizational and managerial challenges. This is reflected in the unsuccessful attempts to establish reserves in Odesa (in 1994), Chuhuiv (1996), and Hamaliivka (2019); land ownership conflicts between the historic reserve and the regional landscape park in Trakhtemyriv; as well as the de facto abolition of the reserve in Lviv due to government-level disagreements. Inadequate government funding hinders proper maintenance, and many reserves still lack scientific and design documentation despite this being a legal requirement. Moreover, several such areas have suffered damage during the ongoing Russo-Ukrainian war, including the reserves in Sviatohirsk, Vasylivka, and Verkhnii Saltiv.

== Historic reserves ==
* Museum-reserves

Historic and cultural reserves in Ukraine
Name	Image	Location (Note: The village, rural settlement, or city where the reserve is located. If the territory of the reserve extends to multiple populated places, the one where the reserve's administration is located is listed first.)	Region (Note: The first-level administrative division (oblast, autonomous republic, or city with special status) where the reserve is located)	Body (Note: The body that manages the reserve)	Area (Note: Rounded to nearest hundredth of a hectare. Reserves without a specified area are marked with a dash (—).)	Date (Note: Date of the reserve's establishment. Other important dates may be mentioned in the description.)	Description	Refs
State Palace and Park Museum-Reserve in Alupka *		Alupka, Masandra	Autonomous Republic of Crimea (Note: Since Russia's occupation and internationally unrecognized annexation of the peninsula in 2014, the Autonomous Republic of Crimea and the city of Sevastopol have been disputed, with most countries recognizing the territory as de jure part of Ukraine while de facto it remains under Russian control. All historic reserves located on the territory of Crimea were reorganized after the annexation of the region and continue functioning under Russia, sometimes under different names (e.g., the State Historic and Cultural Reserve in Kerch is now known as the East Crimean Historic and Cultural Reserve).)	Council of Ministers of Crimea	>40 (Note: The area of the Vorontsov Palace park is 40 ha. This excludes the area of the Masandra Palace.)	8 September 1990	The Vorontsov Palace (pictured), surrounded by a large garden, was built in 1828–1848 for the Russian nobleman Mikhail Vorontsov. The reserve arose from a museum that had previously functioned on the territory of the palace. It also includes the châteauesque Masandra Palace, built for the Russian nobility in 1881–1902.	
State Historic and Cultural Reserve in Bakhchysarai		Bakhchysarai, Khodzha Sala, Kudryne, Pishchane, Viline	Autonomous Republic of Crimea	Council of Ministers of Crimea	—	7 September 1990	Bakhchysarai served as the capital of the Crimean Khanate and has preserved numerous monuments from that era, notably the Khans' Palace (pictured), Eski-Yurt, and Chufut-Kale. The reserve also includes the cave towns of Mangup-Kale and Eski-Kermen, the Scythian Ust-Alma archaeological site, the site of the Battle of the Alma, multiple grave fields, and museums dedicated to Ismail Gasprinsky and art.	
Koktebel Ecological, Historic and Cultural Reserve "Cimmeria of M. O. Voloshin" *		Koktebel, Feodosia, Staryi Krym	Autonomous Republic of Crimea	Council of Ministers of Crimea	—	18 October 2000	The reserve primarily focuses on preserving the heritage of the poet Maximilian Voloshin. In addition to the museum dedicated to him (pictured) and his grave, the reserve also covers the museums of Alexander Grin, Konstantin Paustovsky, and Anastasia and Marina Tsvetaevy, and literature and art.	
Republican Historic and Archaeological Reserve "Kalos Limen"		Chornomorske	Autonomous Republic of Crimea	Council of Ministers of Crimea	2.5	20 May 1997	Kalos Limen is an ancient city founded by the Greeks, and later controlled by the Scythians and the Saltovo-Mayaki culture. In addition to the city's remains (pictured), the reserve manages the Chornomorske Museum of Local History and holds a collection of artifacts from the Tarkhankut Peninsula.	
State Historic and Cultural Reserve in Kerch		Kerch	Autonomous Republic of Crimea	Council of Ministers of Crimea	—	5 March 1987	Kerch is the site of multiple ancient Greek and Bosporan cities, including Pantikapaion, Mymekion, Nymphaion, and Tyritake, the remains of which are included in the reserve. It also covers burial monuments from that period, such as the Crypt of Demeter and the Royal and Melek-Chesme kurgans, as well as other landmarks, notably the Kerch and Yeni-Kale fortresses, Church of Saint John the Baptist (pictured), and museums of the Adzhimushkay quarry, history and archaeology, and the liberation of Kerch.	
Historic and Archaeological Reserve "Scythian Neapolis"		Simferopol	Autonomous Republic of Crimea	Council of Ministers of Crimea	—	27 April 2011	Scythian Neapolis served as the capital of the late Scythian state and existed from the 3rd century BC to 3rd century AD. The reserve includes the remains of the city, with the mausoleum (pictured on the right) being the most prominent surviving structure.	
National Historic and Cultural Reserve "Chyhyryn"		Chyhyryn, Buda, Medvedivka, Stetsivka, Subotiv	Cherkasy Oblast	Ministry of Culture	1,161.7	7 March 1989	Chyhyryn served as the capital of the Cossack Hetmanate from the mid-17th century until 1676. The reserve includes Bohdan Khmelnytsky's residence (pictured), fortress remains, and museums dedicated to Khmelnytsky and archaeology, along with numerous historic buildings and memorials in the city. It also encompasses sites in nearby villages, such as St. Elijah Church, the Three Wells, the Maksym Zalizniak Oak and the Cossack Village open-air museum. The reserve gained national status on 23 September 1995.	
State Historic and Cultural Reserve in Kamianka		Kamianka	Cherkasy Oblast	Cherkasy Regional State Administration	10.1	21 July 1995	The Russian poet Alexander Pushkin and composer Pyotr Ilyich Tchaikovsky once lived in Kamianka, which originally formed the basis of this reserve. It includes the Green House Museum (pictured) and the Historic Museum – both built in the 19th century – as well as an art gallery, a water mill, a park, and a canyon. Since the Russian invasion, which has driven derussification in Ukraine, the reserve's focus has shifted towards local history and prehistory.	
State Historic and Cultural Reserve in Korsun-Shevchenkivskyi		Korsun-Shevchenkivskyi, Kvitky, Stebliv, Vyhraiv	Cherkasy Oblast	Cherkasy Regional State Administration	103	8 February 1994	In the 11th–13th centuries, Korsun served as a defensive fort on the southern border of Kievan Rus'. The archaeological site from that period is one of the largest in the reserve, alongside the 18th–19th-century park with its palace (pictured). The reserve also manages museums dedicated to composer Kyrylo Stetsenko, writer Ivan Nechuy-Levytsky, art, history, and military, in addition to other sites in the city and nearby villages.	
National Historic and Architectural Reserve "Old Uman"		Uman	Cherkasy Oblast	Ministry of Culture	82	18 April 2005	The reserve covers various 18th–20th century buildings in Uman, including the Basilian Monastery, the Dormition Cathedral, the shopping arcade, the women's gymnasium, mass graves, and manors (one pictured).	
Shevchenko National Reserve in Kaniv		Kaniv	Cherkasy Oblast	Ministry of Culture	42	20 August 1925	Taras Shevchenko, Ukraine's national poet, was buried on Chernecha Hill on 22 May 1861. His grave and the two nearby musems dedicated to him form the basis of the reserve. It has since expanded and also includes the Dormition Cathedral, the Pylypenkova Hora archaeological site, and the museums of history and folk art in Kaniv. The reserve gained national status on 21 November 1989.	
National Reserve "Taras Shevchenko Homeland"		Shevchenkove, Budyshche, Moryntsi, Vilshana	Cherkasy Oblast	Ministry of Culture	27.3	25 March 1992	The reserve includes both original and recreated buildings associated with Taras Shevchenko's childhood, along with a monument to him and museums dedicated to his life and local history.	
State Historic and Cultural Reserve "Trakhtemyriv"		Hryhorivka, Buchak, Lukovytsia, Trakhtemyriv	Cherkasy Oblast	Cherkasy Regional State Administration	590	1 July 1994	The Trakhtemyriv Peninsula has been inhabited for many millennia. It was settled by the Scythians, and later the Zarubyntsi culture, which was discovered here. The city of Zarub existed on the territory in the Kievan Rus' era, and the town of Trakhtemyriv later served as an unofficial Cossack capital. The reserve features archaeological sites belonging to a wide range of time periods, as well as a Cossack cemetery and some natural sites. In 1999, the area of the reserve was significantly decreased with the creation of a regional landscape park.	
State Historic and Cultural Reserve "Trypillia Culture"		Lehedzyne, Apolianka, Chychyrkozivka, Dobrovody, Hlybochok, Kosenivka, Maidanetske, Onopriivka, Pishchana, Talianky, Veselyi Kut, Vilkhovets	Cherkasy Oblast	Cherkasy Regional State Administration	2,045	13 March 2002	Cucuteni–Trypillia culture was a Neolithic–Chalcolithic archaeological culture known for building large proto-cities. The reserve encompasses eleven of these settlements, (Note: The settlements are, respectively, named after the nearest village: Apolianka, Chychyrkozivka, Dobrovody, Hlybochok, Kosenivka, Maidanetske, Onopriivka, Pishchana, Talianky, Veselyi Kut, and Vilkhovets.) and its collection holds over 50,000 artifacts. More than 500 of them are displayed in the museum in Lehedzyne, which also has several recreated Trypillian buildings (pictured).	
National Architectural and Historic Reserve "Ancient Chernihiv"		Chernihiv	Chernihiv Oblast	Ministry of Culture	62	22 June 1978	Chernihiv was a major city of Kievan Rus' and the reserve includes six monuments from that period. Among them is the Transfiguration Cathedral, the city and region's oldest building (pictured on the left). It also includes several sacral and secular Cossack-era Baroque buildings, as well as some archaeological sites and two sculptures.	
Chernihiv Literary Memorial Museum-Reserve of M. M. Kotsiubynsky *		Chernihiv	Chernihiv Oblast	Chernihiv Regional State Administration		1993		
National Historic and Cultural Reserve "Hetman's Capital"		Baturyn, Khalymonove, Palchyky, Verbivka	Chernihiv Oblast	Ministry of Culture	57	14 June 1993	Baturyn served as the capital of the Cossack Hetmanate in 1669–1708 and 1750–1764. The reserve includes the rebuilt fortress citadel (pictured), Rozumovskyi Palace, Ascension Church, Kochubey House, museums of history and archaeology, and other landmarks in the city and its surroundings. Its ownership was transferred to the Ministry of Culture on 29 March 2006, and the reserve gained national status on 16 November 2007.	
National Historic and Cultural Reserve "Kachanivka"		Kachanivka	Chernihiv Oblast	Ministry of Culture	568.63	24 November 1981	The reserve covers the 18th–20th century Kachanivka Park and the twenty-four landmarks in it, most notably the neo-classicist palace (pictured). The estate was visited by numerous contemporary artists and has collected a variety of works. The reserve gained national status on 27 February 2001.	
Novhorod-Siverskyi State Historic and Cultural Museum-Reserve "The Tale of Igor's Campaign" *		Novhorod-Siverskyi	Chernihiv Oblast	Chernihiv Regional State Administration	—	27 August 1990	Novhorod-Siverskyi was a major regional center of the Kievan Rus'. The reserve covers the Transfiguration Monastery and musems dedicated to local history and The Tale of Igor's Campaign, as well as other historic sites in the city. The reserve was first created in 1929 but subsequently dissolved. The museum of local history was re-established in 1975 and later transformed into a reserve.	
Regional Historic and Memorial Museum-Reserve of Panteleimon Kulish "Hannyna Pustyn" *		Olenivka	Chernihiv Oblast	Chernihiv Regional State Administration	9.2	28 June 2000	The museum is dedicated to the writers Panteleimon Kulish and Hanna Barvinok and located inside the house where they had resided. The graves of the two authors and Vasyl Bilozersky, as well as the surroundings of the house, are also included in the reserve.	
State Historic and Cultural Reserve "Khotyn Fortress"		Khotyn	Chernivtsi Oblast	Ministry of Culture	16.10	12 October 2000	The reserve covers the Khotyn Fortress, which dates to the 13th–19th centuries, as well as other landmarks that belong to the ensemble. Its ownership was transferred to the Ministry of Culture on 20 October 2011.	
Sviatohirsk State Historic and Architectural Reserve		Sviatohirsk	Donetsk Oblast	Donetsk Regional State Administration	19	27 May 1980	The reserve includes the Sviatohirsk Lavra – a monastery that dates to the 17th–19th centuries – as well as a historical museum, a World War II memorial, and a sculpture by Ivan Kavaleridze. It was known as the Slovianohirsk State Historic and Cultural Reserve until 2003, when the city was renamed to Sviatohirsk.	
National Reserve "Ancient Halych"		Halych, Bilshivtsi, Krylos, Shevchenkove, Zalukva	Ivano-Frankivsk Oblast	Ministry of Culture	—	8 February 1994	Medieval Halych was a major city of the Kievan Rus', and its remains within modern-day Krylos (pictured) are included in the reserve. It also covers various monuments in modern Halych and neighboring villages, notably the Church of Saint Pantaleon in Shevchenkove.	
State Historic and Archeological Museum-Reserve "Verkhnii Saltiv" *		Verkhnii Saltiv	Kharkiv Oblast	Kharkiv Regional State Administration	150.19	20 October 1997	The reserve covers one of the type sites of the Saltovo-Mayaki culture that belongs to the 8th–10th centuries. The museum was founded on 20 October 1899 and has been under government protection since 21 July 1965.	
State Historic and Cultural Reserve "Samchyky"		Samchyky	Khmelnytskyi Oblast	Khmelnytskyi Regional State Administration	18	5 August 1997	The reserve encompasses an 18th–19th-century park complex on the shore of a lake, including the neo-classicist palace (pictured), the old manor, the orientalist Chinese house, and other buildings and structures.	
National Historic and Architectural Reserve "Kamianets"		Kamianets-Podilskyi	Khmelnytskyi Oblast	Ministry of Culture	121	18 May 1977	Kamianets-Podilskyi, the capital of the historic region of Podolia, dates back to the medieval period and is particularly known for its location within the Smotrych River canyon. The reserve covers the castle (pictured) and numerous landmarks in the old town. The reserve gained national status on 30 April 1998.	
State Historic and Cultural Reserve "Mezhybizh"		Medzhybizh	Khmelnytskyi Oblast	Khmelnytskyi Regional State Administration	—	18 January 2001	Medzhybizh was founded in the medieval period but mostly developed in the 16–18th centuries. Monuments from that period, such as the fortress (pictured), are included in the reserve.	
State Museum-Reserve of I. K. Tobilevych (Karpeno-Karyi) "Khutir Nadiia" *		Mykolaivka	Kirovohrad Oblast	Central Ukrainian Museum of Regional Studies (Note: Although the planned Historic and Memorial Reserve "Chornyi Voron" in Rozumivka dedicated to Ivan Yakovych Chornousov is already indicated on the website of the Central Ukrainian Museum of Regional Studies, it has not yet been established and its creation is postponed to after the end of the Russo-Ukrainian war.)	11	1 August 1956	The reserve is dedicated to the playwright and theatrical figure Ivan Tobilevych (Karpenko-Karyi). It covers the estate that belonged to his family, including his house that now houses a museum and the park that surrounds it.	
Historic and Cultural Reserve "Exaltation of the Holy Cross Church"		Rozumivka	Kirovohrad Oblast	Central Ukrainian Museum of Regional Studies	—	24 October 2004	The 19th-century neo-classicist Exaltation of the Holy Cross Church functions as the tomb of the Raevsky family, including the general Nikolay Raevsky. In 2014, its ownership was transferred from the Kirovohrad Regional State Administration to the museum of regional studies. It was known as the Historic-Architectural Reserve of the Raevsky Family until its renaming to comply with derussification laws.	
State Historic and Architectural Reserve "Ancient Kyiv"		Kyiv	Kyiv	Kyiv City State Administration	175	18 May 1987	The reserve covers a large number of historic sites in Old Kyiv and Podil, notably St. Michael's Golden-Domed Monastery (pictured), Kyiv-Mohyla Academy, Ascension Monastery, Intercession Monastery, the Contract Square complex, and archaeological sites.	
National Historic and Memorial Reserve "Babyn Yar"		Kyiv	Kyiv	Ministry of Culture	28.2	1 March 2007	Babyn Yar (Babi Yar) was the site of Nazi mass shootings, primarily targeting Jews, which resulted in an estimated 100–150 thousand deaths. The Syrets concentration camp was also located nearby. In 1961, the site was further affected by the Kurenivka mudslide, which caused an unknown number of casualties. Nowadays, the area forms a park containing numerous memorials and monuments. The reserve gained national status on 24 February 2010.	
National Historic and Memorial Reserve "Bykivnia Graves"		Kyiv	Kyiv	Ministry of Culture	239	22 May 2001	A section of the Bykivnia Forest contains secret mass graves of victims executed by the NKVD in 1937–1941, with more than 30,000 unmarked burials. The development of a memorial complex at the site began in 1994. The reserve gained national status on 17 May 2006.	
National Reserve "Kyiv-Pechersk Lavra"		Kyiv	Kyiv	Ministry of Culture	27.29	29 September 1926	The Kyiv-Pechersk Lavra was established in 1051. This cave monastery was reconstructed in the Ukrainian Baroque style the 17th–18th centuries, and in the 19th century expanded to its current form. The Lavra, together with Saint Sophia Cathedral, became a World Heritage Site in 1990. The reserve gained national status on 13 March 1996. Before 24 December 2020, its name was the National Kyiv-Pechersk Historic and Cultural Reserve.	
State Historic and Memorial Lukianivka Reserve		Kyiv	Kyiv	Kyiv City State Administration		1 July 1994		
National Reserve "Sophia of Kyiv"		Kyiv, Sudak	Kyiv	Ministry of Culture		1934		
National Museum-Reserve of Ukrainian Military Achievements *		Novi Petrivtsi	Kyiv Oblast	Kyiv Regional State Administration		12 March 1996		
National Historic and Ethnographic Reserve "Pereiaslav"		Pereiaslav	Kyiv Oblast	Ministry of Culture		13 March 1979		
State Historic and Cultural Reserve in Vyshhorod		Vyshhorod	Kyiv Oblast	Kyiv Regional State Administration		6 July 1994		
State Historic and Cultural Reserve in Belz		Belz	Lviv Oblast	Ministry of Culture		13 December 2001		
Historic and Cultural Reserve "Ancient Plisnesk"		Pidhirtsi	Lviv Oblast	Lviv Regional State Administration		15 September 2015		
Historic and Cultural Reserve "Ancient Zvenyhorod"		Zvenyhorod	Lviv Oblast	Lviv Regional State Administration	31	2020		
State Historic and Architectural Reserve in Lviv (Note: De facto not functioning since 1991)		Lviv	Lviv Oblast	Lviv Regional State Administration		12 June 1975	Old Town	
Historic and Cultural Reserve "Lychakiv Cemetery"		Lviv	Lviv Oblast	Lviv Regional State Administration		10 July 1990		
State Historic and Cultural Reserve "Nahuievychi"		Nahuievychi	Lviv Oblast	Lviv Regional State Administration		10 March 1994		
Historic and Cultural Reserve "Stilsko Hillfort"		Stilsko	Lviv Oblast	Lviv Regional State Administration		15 September 2015		
State Historic and Cultural Reserve "Tustan"		Urych	Lviv Oblast	Lviv Regional State Administration		5 October 1994		
State Historic and Architectural Reserve in Zhovkva		Zhovkva	Lviv Oblast	Ministry of Culture		10 August 1994		
Historic and Archeological Reserve "Olbia"		Parutyne	Mykolaiv Oblast	National Academy of Sciences of Ukraine		31 May 1926		
Historic and Cultural Reserve "Bilsk"		Bilsk	Poltava Oblast	Poltava Regional State Administration		15 April 2005		
State Historic and Cultural Reserve "Poltava Battlefield"		Poltava	Poltava Oblast	Poltava Regional State Administration		31 March 1981		
State Museum-Reserve of N. V. Gogol *		Hoholeve	Poltava Oblast	Poltava Regional State Administration		17 July 1979		
National Museum-Reserve of Ukrainian Pottery in Opishnia *		Opishnia, Miski Mlyny	Poltava Oblast	Poltava Regional State Administration		3 November 1989		
National Reserve "Chersonesos Taurica"		Sevastopol, Inkerman	Sevastopol	Ministry of Culture		1978	Chersonesos was a major ancient and medieval Greek colony on the Black Sea, and the remains of the city and its chora (surrounding agricultural plots) are included in the reserve. It also covers the Cembalo and Kalamita fortresses. The reserve gained national status on 8 February 1994. Chersonesos became a World Heritage Site in 2013.	
National State Historic and Cultural Reserve "Hlukhiv"		Hlukhiv	Sumy Oblast	Ministry of Culture		8 February 1994		
State Historic and Cultural Reserve "Posullia"		Pustoviitivka, Khoruzhivka, Kulishivka, Nedryhailiv, Romny	Sumy Oblast	Sumy Regional State Administration		2007		
State Historic and Cultural Reserve in Putyvl		Putyvl	Sumy Oblast	Sumy Regional State Administration		30 December 1986		
State Historic and Cultural Reserve in Dubno		Dubno	Rivne Oblast	Rivne Regional State Administration		14 June 1993		
National Historic and Memorial Reserve "Berestechko Battlefield"		Pliasheva	Rivne Oblast	Ministry of Culture		12 June 1991		
State Historic and Cultural Reserve in Ostroh		Ostroh	Rivne Oblast	Rivne Regional State Administration		11 August 1981		
National Reserve "Castles of Ternopil Oblast"		Zbarazh, Chortkiv, Kryvche, Mykulyntsi, Pidzamochok, Skala-Podilska, Skalat, Terebovlia, Vyshnivets, Yazlovets, Zaluzhzhia, Zolotyi Potik	Ternopil Oblast	Ministry of Culture		8 February 1994		
State Historic and Cultural Reserve in Berezhany		Berezhany	Ternopil Oblast	Ministry of Culture		17 November 2001		
Kremenets–Pochaiv State Historic and Architectural Reserve		Kremenets, Pochaiv	Ternopil Oblast	Ministry of Culture		29 May 2001		
State Historic and Cultural Reserve "Busha"		Busha	Vinnytsia Oblast	Vinnytsia Regional State Administration		18 August 2000		
State Historic and Cultural Reserve "Ancient Volodymyr"		Volodymyr	Volyn Oblast	Volyn Regional State Administration		17 November 2001		
Lutsk Historic and Cultural Reserve		Lutsk	Volyn Oblast	Volyn Regional State Administration		26 March 1985		
National Historic and Archeological Reserve "Stone Grave"		Terpinnia	Zaporizhzhia Oblast	Ministry of Culture		12 February 1986		
National Reserve "Khortytsia"		Zaporizhzhia	Zaporizhzhia Oblast	Ministry of Culture		18 September 1965		
Historic and Architectural Museum-Reserve "Popov's Manor" in Vasylivka *		Vasylivka	Zaporizhzhia Oblast	Zaporizhzhia Regional State Administration		29 January 1993		

== Map ==
Location of historic and cultural reserves in Ukraine. Blue dots indicate museum-reserves. There are six reserves in Kyiv.

== See also ==
- List of World Heritage Sites in Ukraine
- Protected areas of Ukraine
- State Register of Immovable Monuments of Ukraine
- Historical regions in present-day Ukraine
