= Svetlana Pletnyova =

Russian archaeologist (1926-2008)

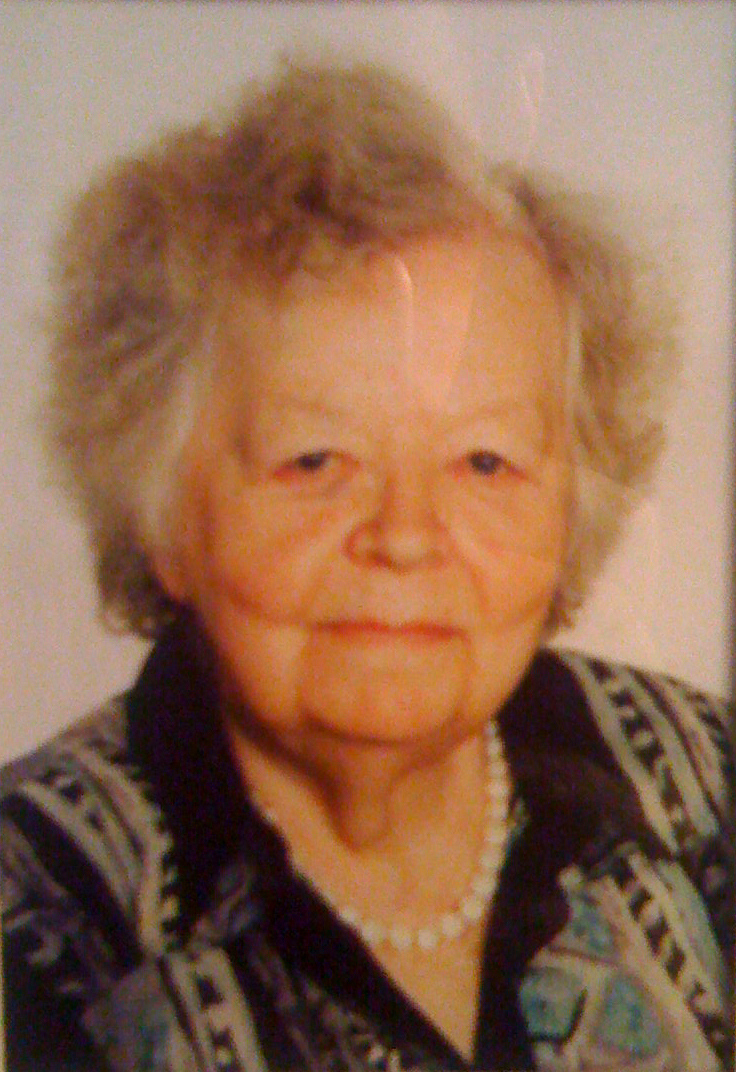

Svetlana Alexandrovna Pletnyova (also spelled Pletneva and Pletnyeva; Russian: Светлана Александровна Плетнёва, Russian pronunciation: [svʲɪtˈɫanə ɐlʲɪkˈsandrəvnə plʲɪtʲˈnʲɵvə]; 1 April 1926, Vyatka – 20 November 2008, Moscow) was a Russian archaeologist and historian. She was the world's leading authority on the Khazars and authored numerous books about early medieval inhabitants of the Pontic–Caspian steppe.

Both Pletnyova and Lev Gumilev studied under Mikhail Artamonov, but she rejected many of Gumilev's theories as groundless speculation. She participated in Artamonov's excavation of Sarkel (1949–1951), then led a series of expeditions which excavated other key sites of the Saltovo-Mayaki culture. For instance, a Soviet-Bulgarian-Hungarian expedition under Pletnyova's leadership explored the Mayatskoye settlement (1975, 1977–1982). She also directed excavations of the Tmutarakan fortress on the Black Sea coast.

In her seminal monograph From Mobile Camps to Cities (1967), Pletnyova examines the transformation of the Pontic-Caspian nomads from mobile steppe riders into semi-nomadic and eventually fully sedentary communities. She traces the gradual evolution of their settlements — from temporary camps and unfortified villages to imposing stone fortifications and early medieval cities. At the same time, she charts the parallel shift in housing, from portable yurts to permanent semi-dugouts and surface dwellings with fixed hearths.

Pletnyova also authored the books about the Black Klobuks (1974), Polovtsians / Cumans (1990), and other European steppe peoples. Her influential catalogue of Cuman balbals (stelae) appeared in 1974. According to her disciple Valery Flyorov,

Before her, Russian historiography had treated the nomads as an annoying obstacle on the historical path of Rus'. Pletnyova made the antiquities of the Pechenegs, Torks, and Polovtsians a legitimate object of study on the same level as the cultures of the Scythians, Slavs, Rus', and so on. She was the first to systematize nomadic burials and artifacts and laid the foundations of their chronology.

In 1988, she succeeded Boris Rybakov as the editor-in-chief of the journal Soviet Archaeology. She won the USSR State Prize in 1986. She was also awarded the Order of the Badge of Honour.

Preceded by Rybakov, Boris Alexandrovich	Head Editor of the journal Russian Archaeology; 1988—1994	Succeeded by Gulyaev, Valeriy Ivanovich
