= Divnogorye =

Nature reserve museum Divnogorye
- Музей-заповедник «Дивногорье»
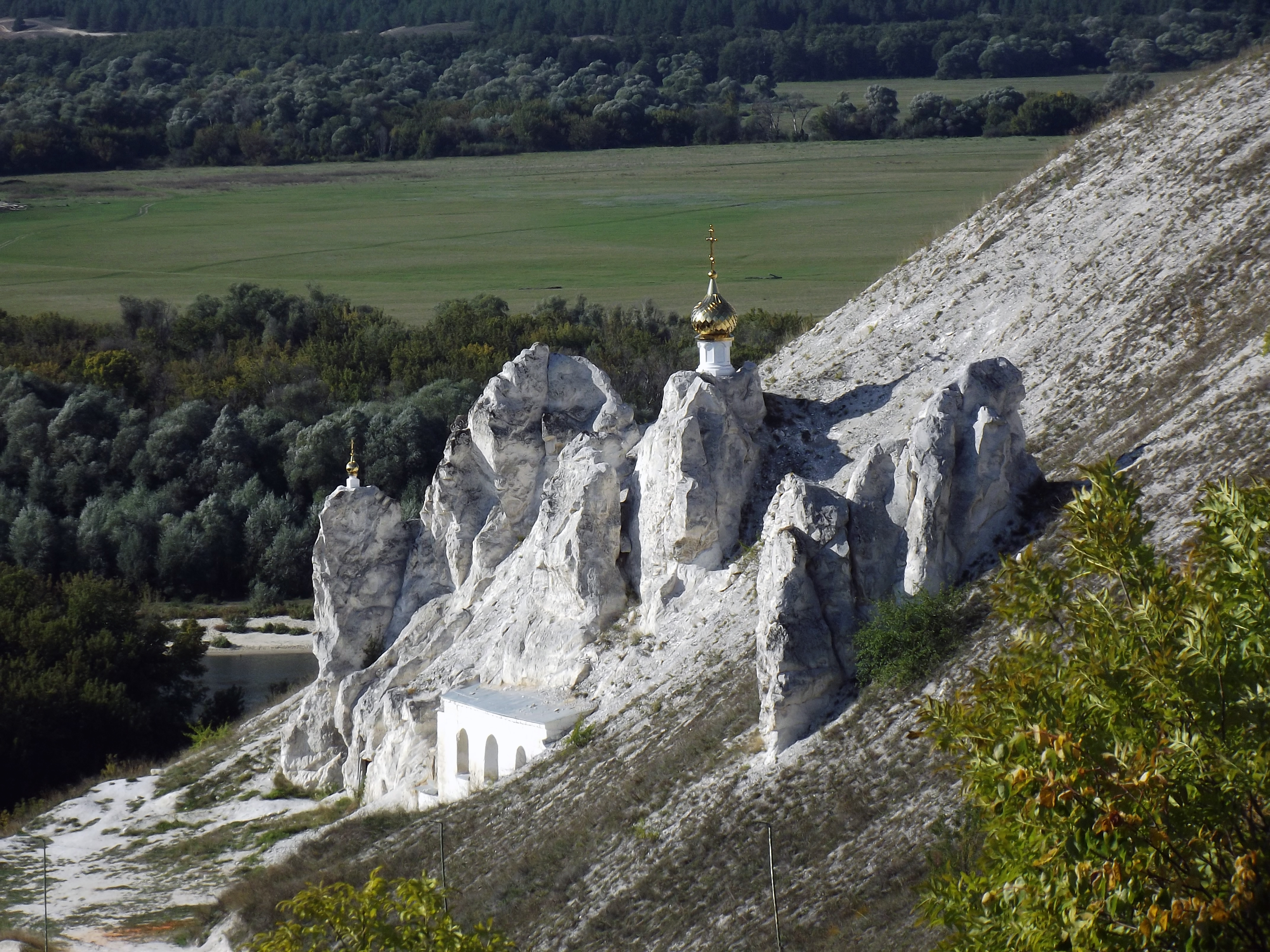
- Cave monastery of St. John the Baptist
- Established: 1988
- Location: Liskinsky District, Voronezh Oblast, Russia
- Coordinates: 50.970°N 39.316°E
- Type: Open-air museum
- Visitors: 60,000
- Website: Official site

Nature reserve museum Divnogorye (Russian: Музей-заповедник «Дивногорье», Muzej-zapovednik Divnogor'e) is a plateau and open-air museum in Liskinsky District, Voronezh Oblast, Russia. It is located 10 km to the west of Liski, the administrative center of the Liskinsky District. It is situated on the right bank of the Don River, 80 km to the south of Voronezh, not far from khutor Divnogorye. The museum was established in 1988 and received the official status of a nature reserve museum in 1991. Divnogorye remains one of the most popular and recognizable tourist attractions of Voronezh Oblast. More than 60,000 visitors are attracted every season (from May to October), mostly from Voronezh and the wider Voronezh Oblast.

== Description ==
Divnogorye Nature reserve museum occupies 11 km^{2} (4.2 sq mi) of limestone outcrops. Maximum altitude above sea level is 181 m or 103 m relative to the mouth of the Tikhaya Sosna River at the confluence with Don River (which flows at the foot of the plateau). Due to the rather significant difference in altitude between the plateau and the floodplain of the Don and Tikhaya Sosna rivers, its microclimate differs significantly from its surrounding lowlands. The plateau quickly heats up; rising streams of hot air drive away the emerging clouds toward the low floodplain lands. As a result, annual rainfall in the region (an average of 480 mm per year) over the plateau is reduced by a factor of 1.5–2. The summer period is especially arid. This inhibits the process of water erosion, and also reduces the likelihood of karst dips. The topsoil layer consists of 15–20% of limestone. Below 80 cm (31 in) there is a layer of pure limestone. The top layer undergoes wind erosion (weathering). Despite rather steep slopes, the plateau has undergone significant anthropogenic changes: in 1860 some of it was blown up using dynamite for laying a railway. In addition, shepherds and vandalism caused significant damage.

== Etymology ==
Divnogorye (Russian: Дивногорье) comes from two Russian words Дивная гора. Local chalk pillars were called "divy" (singular: divo) by the local population; divo means miracle. The first written evidence is the records of deacon Ignatius Smolyanin, who accompanied Metropolitan Pimen in 1389: "We sailed to the Tikhaya Sosna and saw pillars [of] white stone, wonderfully and beautifully standing next to [each other], like small, white and very bright stacks, above the Sosna river" («приплыхом к Тихой Сосне и видехом столпы камень белы, дивно ж и красно стоят рядом, яко стози малы, белы и светлы зело, над рекой над Сосною»).

== Flora and fauna ==
The territory of Divnogorye is located on the northern outskirts steppe zone and differs significantly from the forest steppe zone of Voronezh. For a long time the plateau and its slopes were used for sheep farming which lead to significant vegetation degradation. But after cessation of grazing and human presence regulation, the steppe vegetation was restored in its original form. More than 250 species of xerophytic and petrophytic plants grows on the plateau such as: European feather grass, Salvia nutans, limestone thyme, Securigera varia, Eastern Centaurea, Ephedra distachya, Schiveréckia podólica, Clematis integrifolia, Pulsatilla pratensis, Onosma simplicissima, pygmy iris and Iris aphylla, snowdrop anemone, Adonis vernalis. Great bustard and golden eagle can be occasionally seen on the territory of the reserve. Merops and Eurasian eagle-owl are more common. Hares and foxes are most common mammals. Bats live in the crevices. The entomological fauna is rich, among which the most common are: bumblebees, dragonflies, paper wasps, Saga pedo, stag beetles, Lethrus beetles, swallowtail butterflies

== Tourism ==
Divnogorye is the center of Orthodox pilgrimage. On the territory of the museum and the immediate vicinity there are: cave churches of The Sicilian Icon of the Mother of God, St. John the Baptist and Divnogorsk-3 (XIX century), The Cathedral of the Assumption of the Blessed Virgin Mary (XVII century), and the Mayatsk fortress (Khazar, IX-X centuries) and necropolis and Mayatsk pottery complex (Khazar, IX-X centuries), archaeological park. The nature reserve museum is accessible for free, there is a wide range of excursion programs for organized tourist groups. There is a camping ground and a hotel next to the museum. Excursion trails and attractions on the territory of the museum are marked with information signs and supplied with tourist information. The territory of the museum is guarded.

== Gallery ==
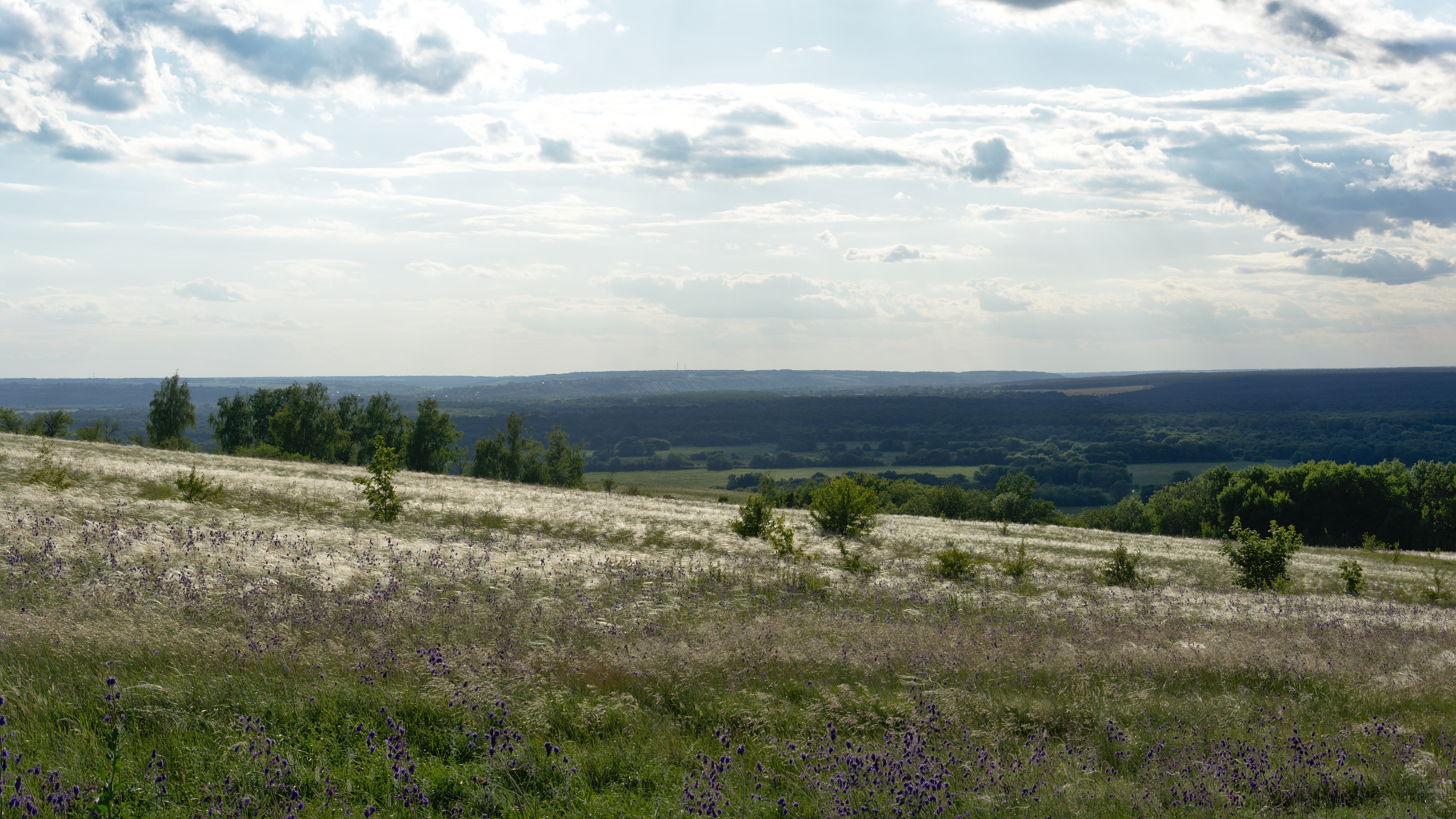
Typical view of steppe in Divnogorye

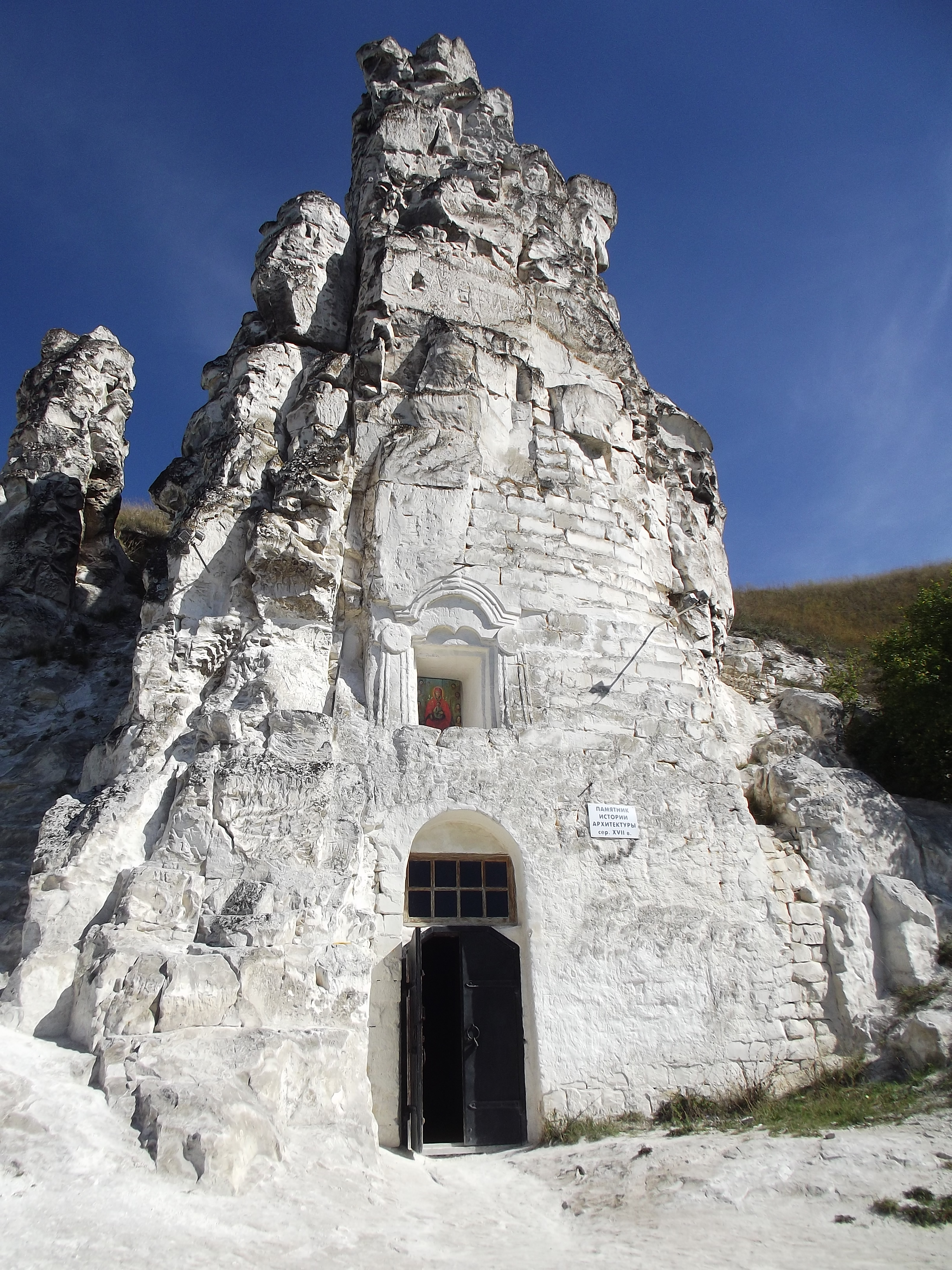
Entrance to cave church of the Sicilian Icon of the Mother of God

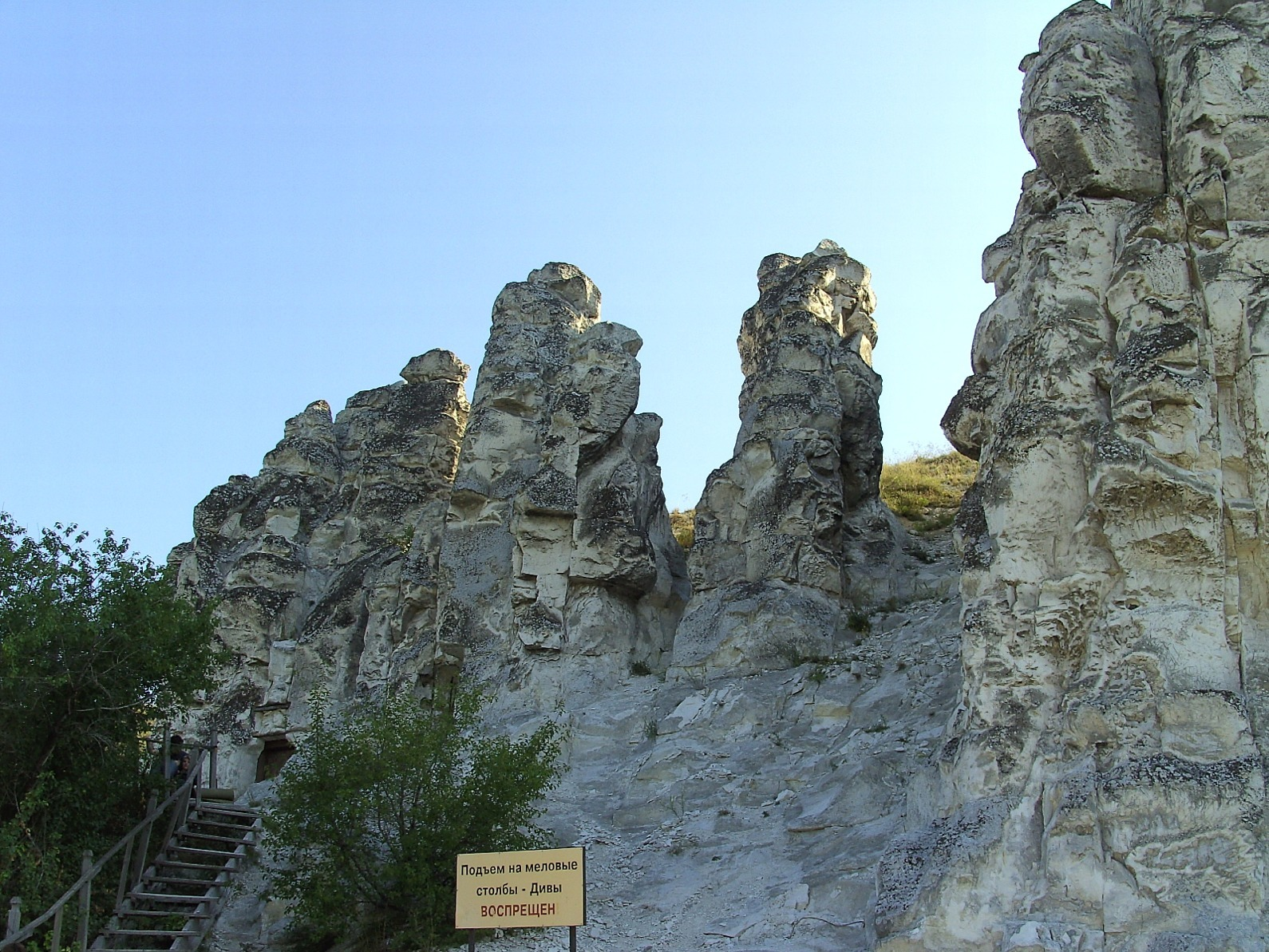
Greater Divy

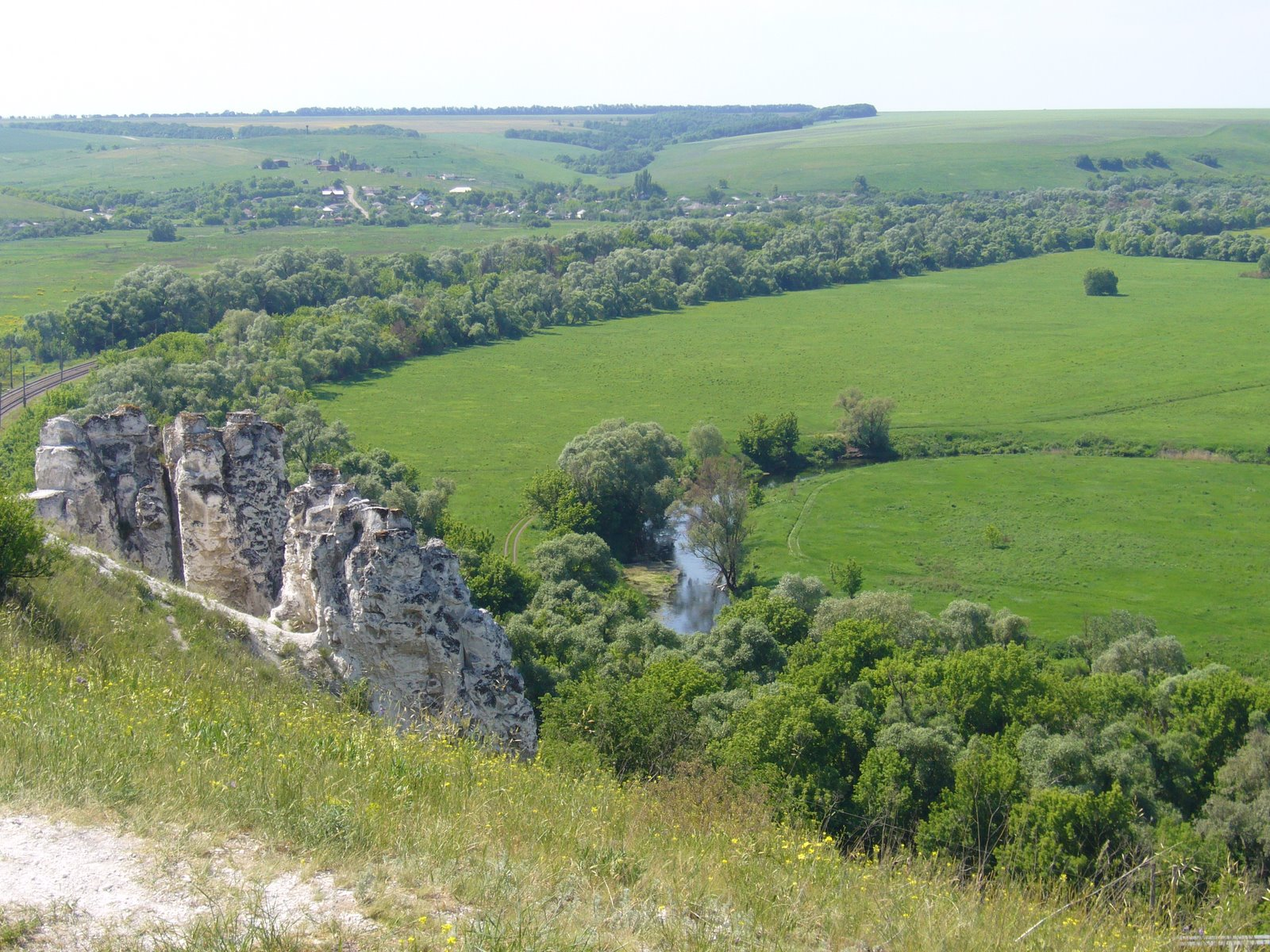
View from hills onto Greater Divy

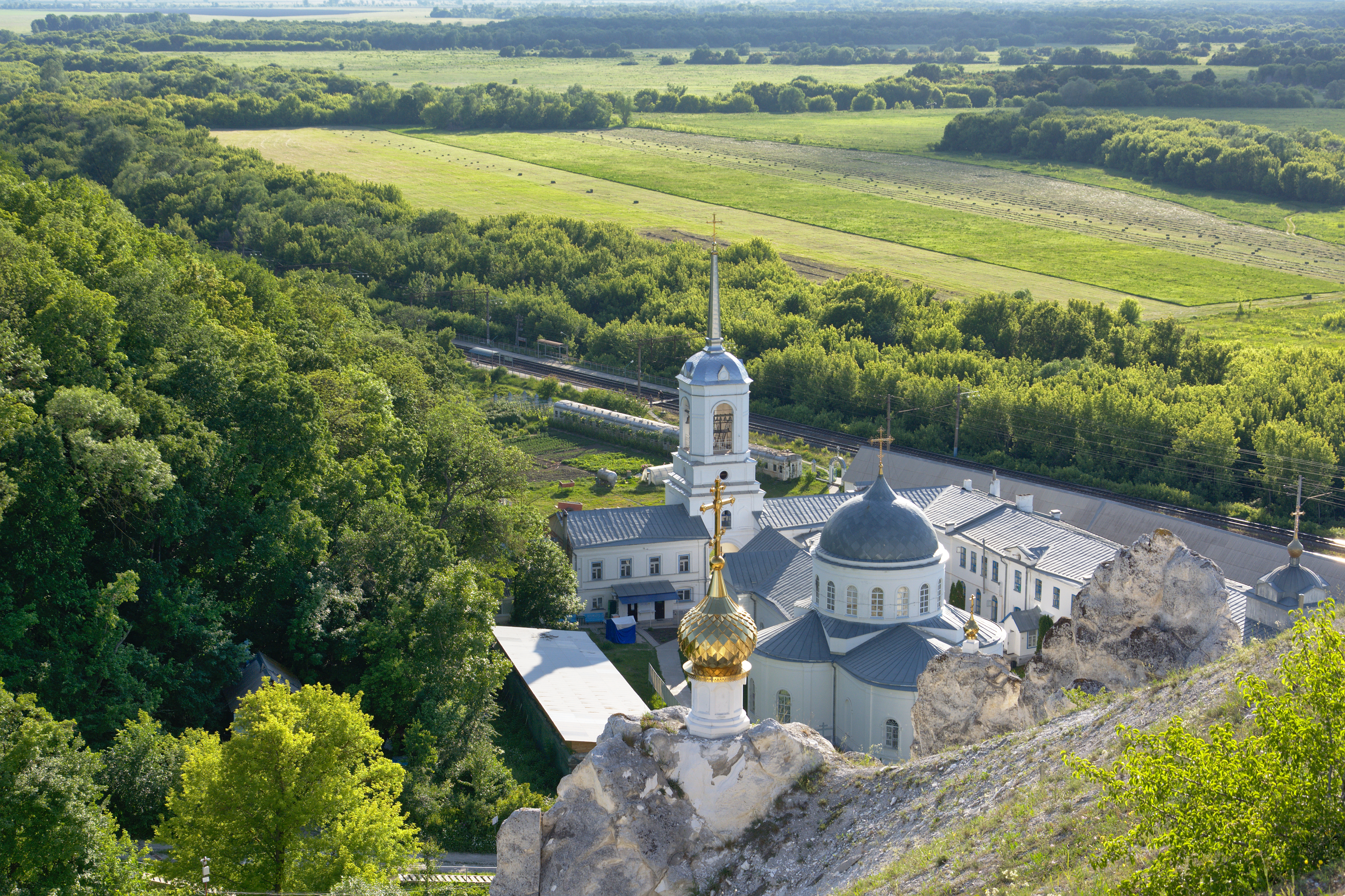
Cathedral of the Assumption of the Blessed Virgin Mary viewed from Lesser Divy

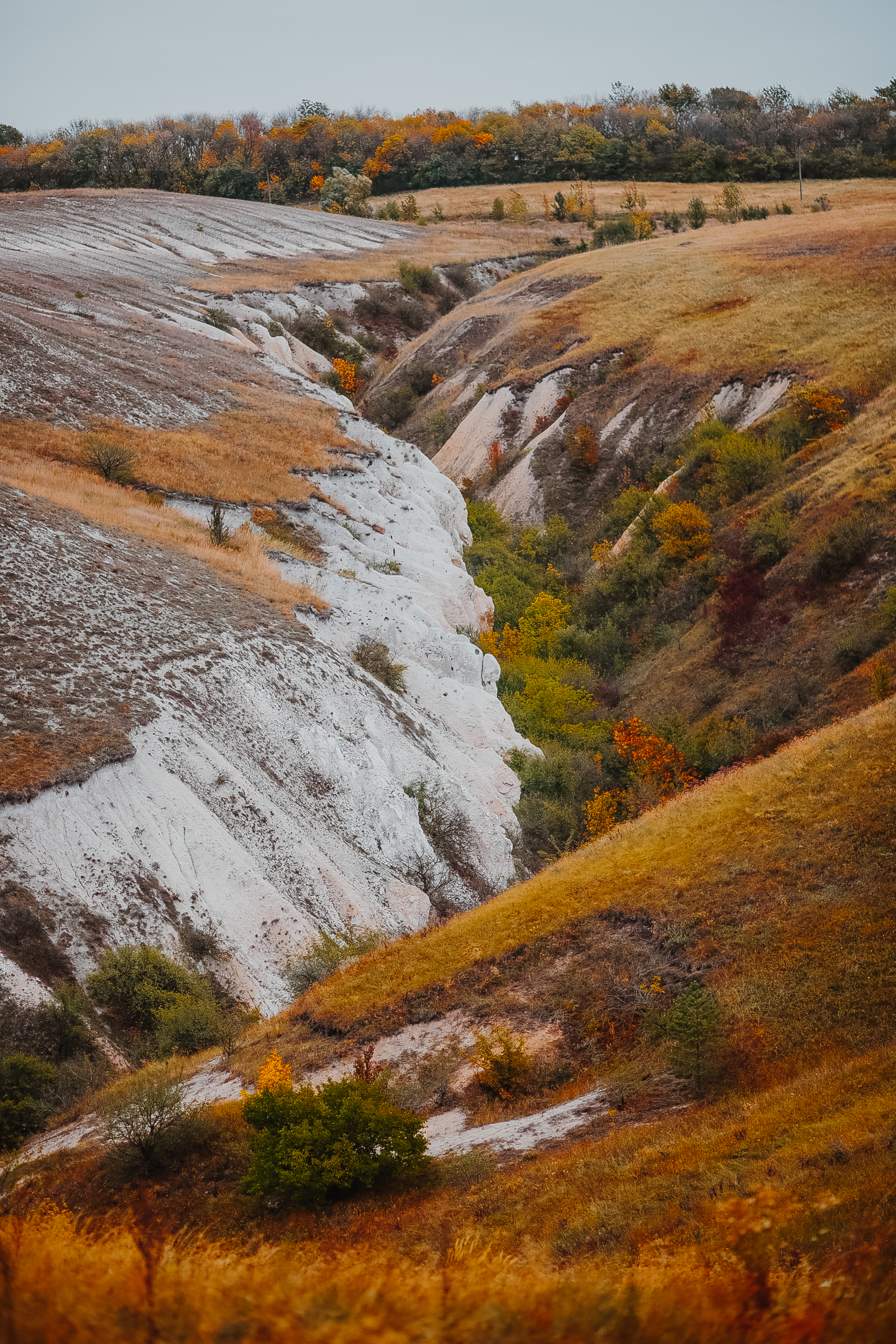
Divnogorye canyon in autumn

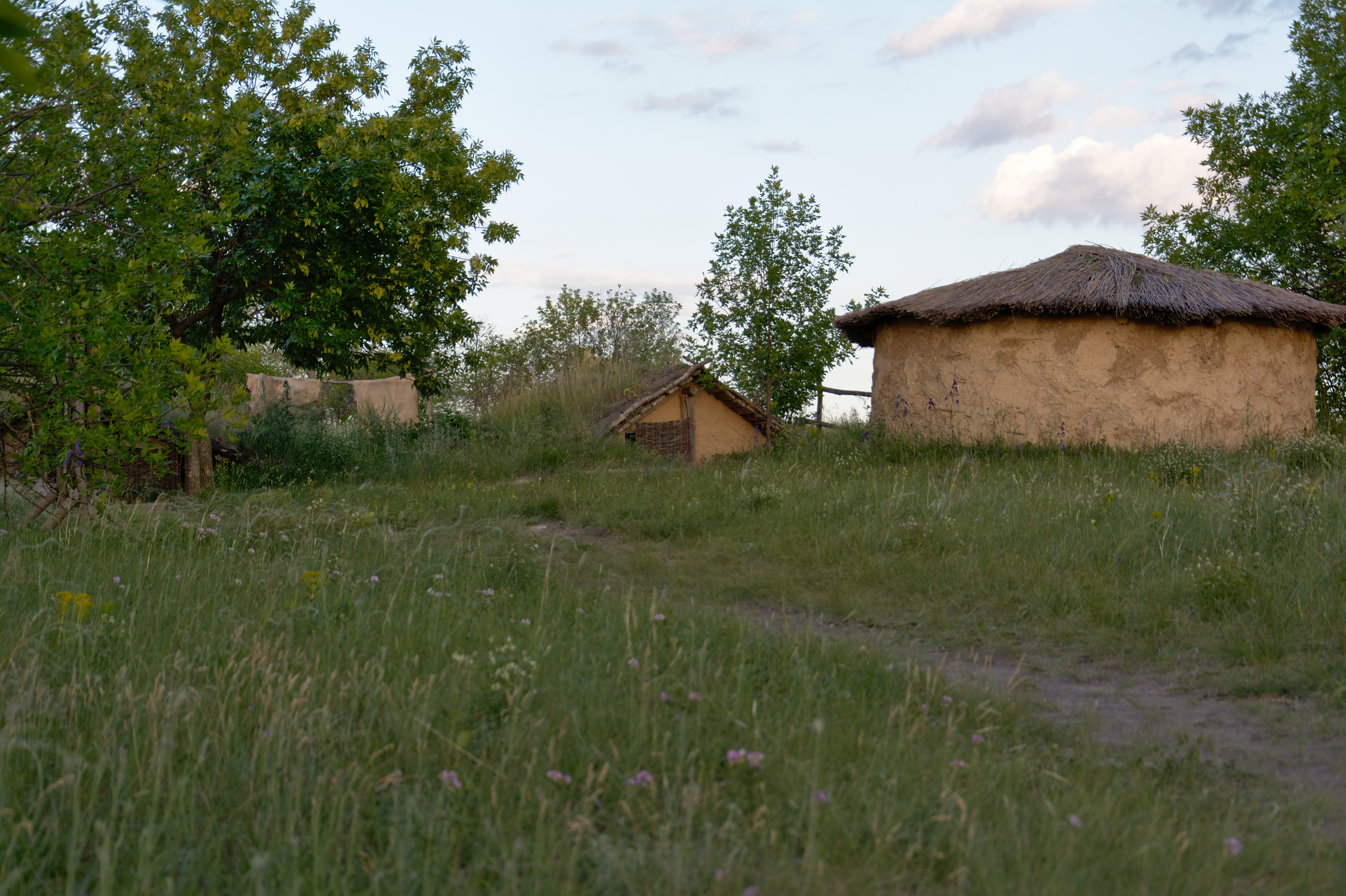
Archeological park

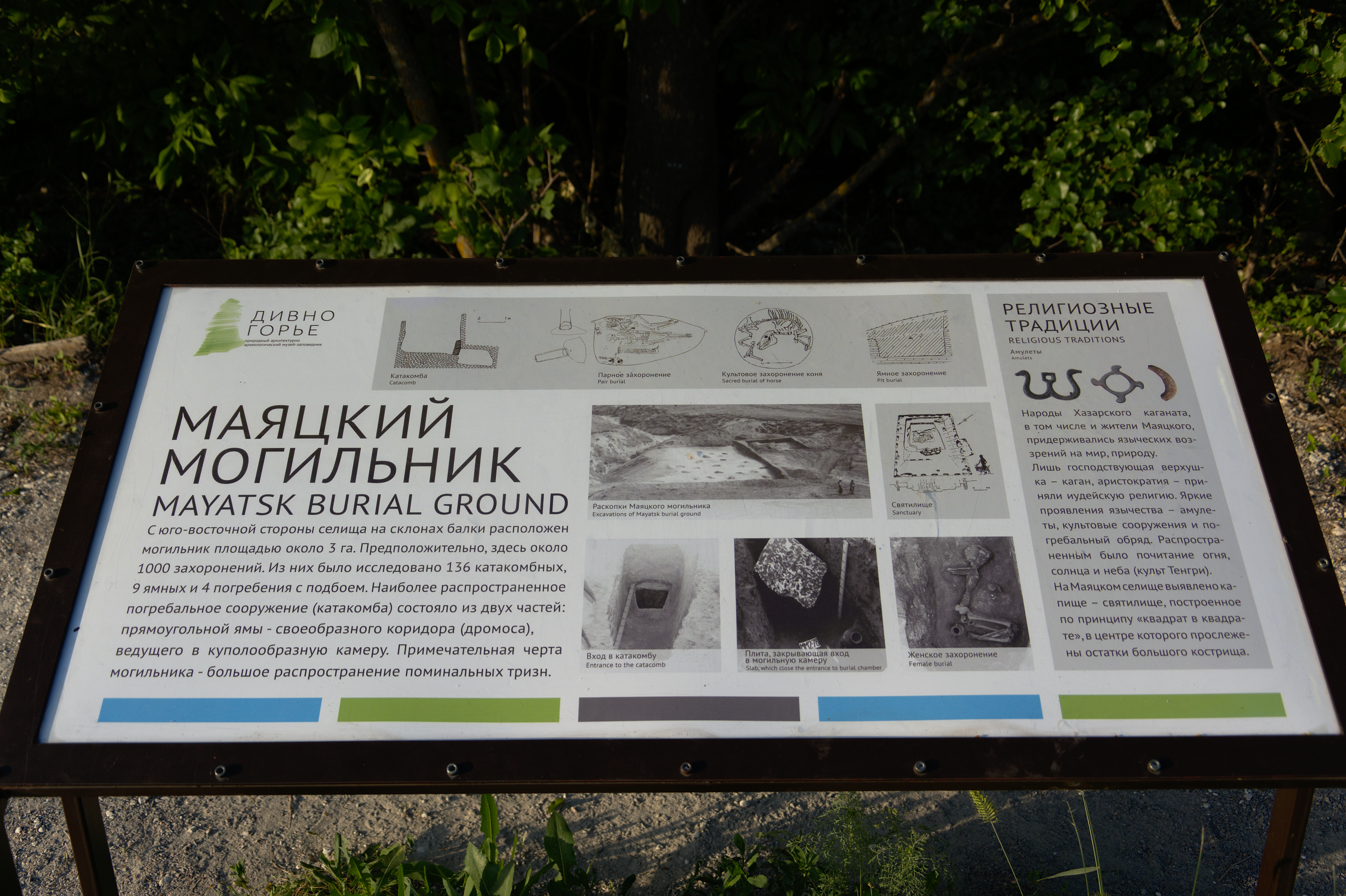
Example of information board for tourists

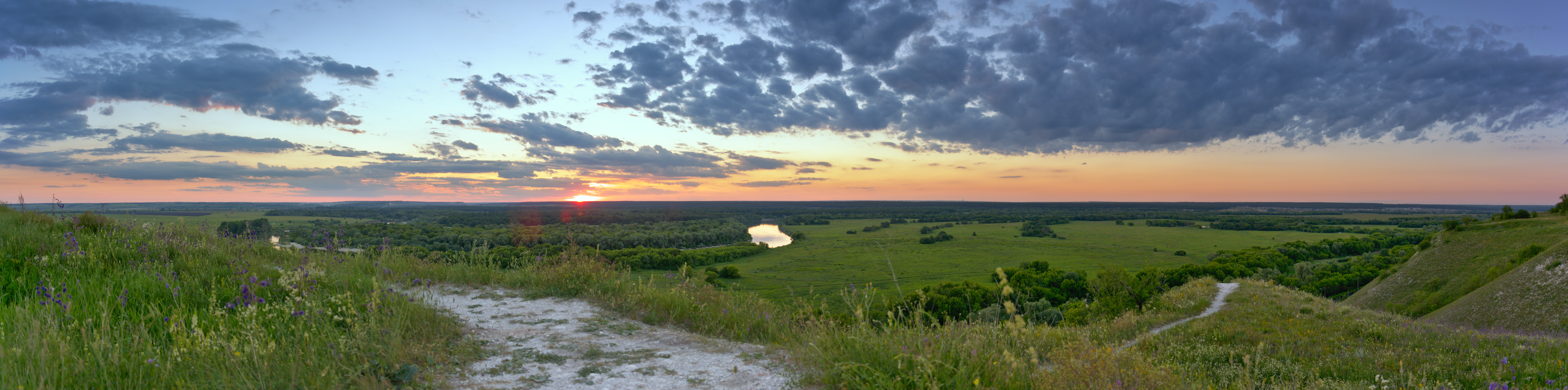
Divnogorye, Don river view from Mayatsk fortress

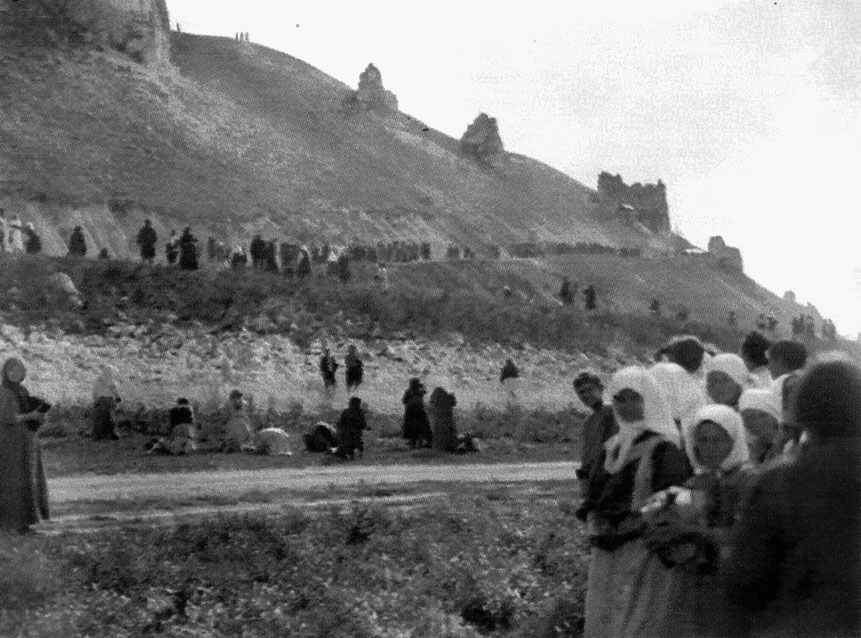
Orthodox pilgrims in Divnogorye, end of 19th century
