= Verkhnii Saltiv (museum-reserve) =

Historic-Archaeological Museum-Reserve "Verkhnii Saltiv" named after V. O. Babenko
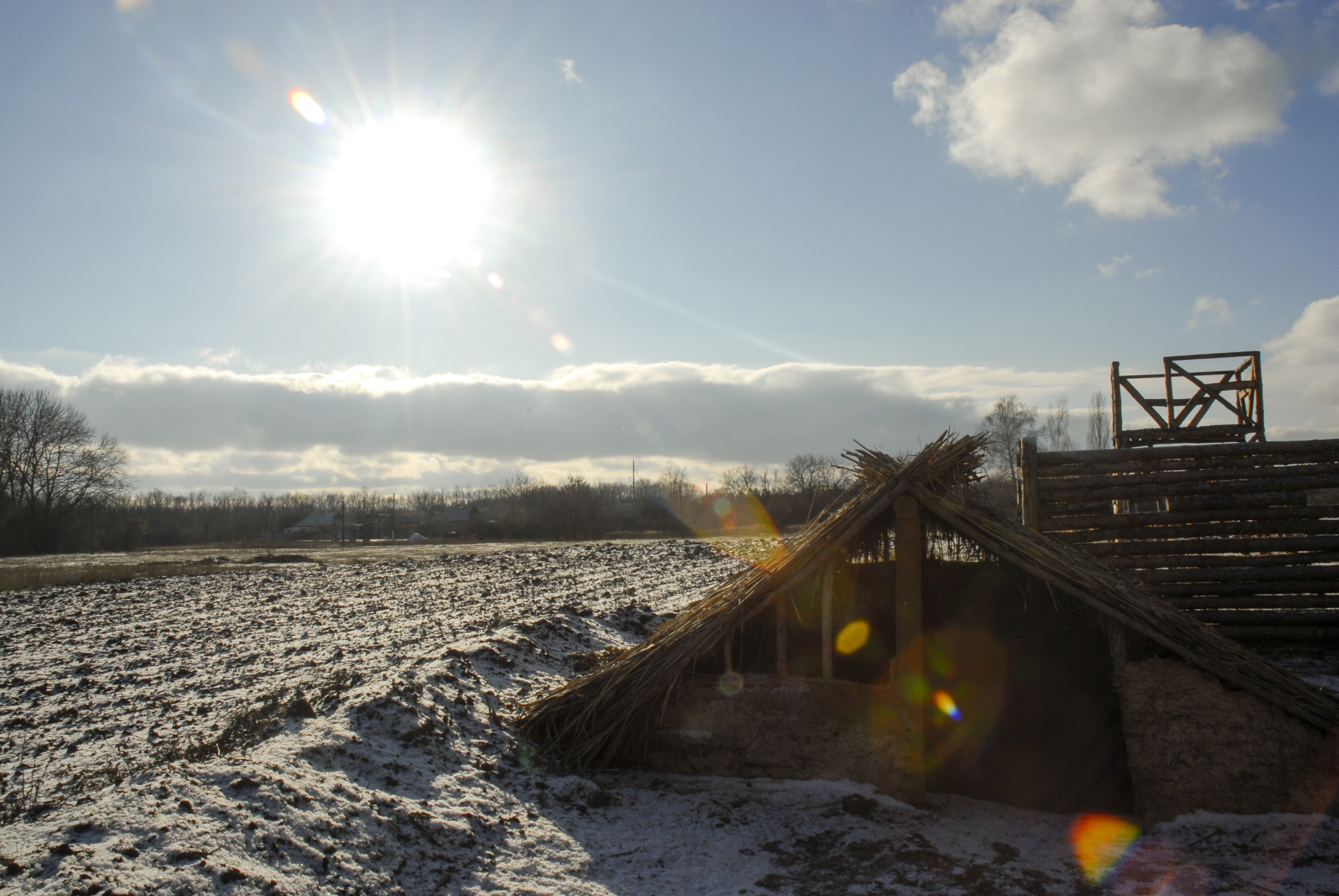
- Interactive map of Historic-Archaeological Museum-Reserve "Verkhnii Saltiv" named after V. O. Babenko
- Location: Chuhuiv Raion, Kharkiv Oblast, Ukraine
- Nearest city: Verkhnii Saltiv
- Coordinates: 50°07′57″N 36°47′30″E
- Area: 518 m^{2} (5,580 sq ft)
- Established: 1899
- Website: https://vsaltiv.at.ua/

Immovable Monument of National Significance of Ukraine
- Official name: Салтівський археологічний комплекс: городище і катакомбний могильник (Saltiv archaeological complex: settlement and catacomb grave field)
- Type: Archaeology
- Reference no.: 200017-Н

Verkhnii Saltiv (Ukrainian: Історико-археологічний музей–заповідник «Верхній Салтів» імені В. О. Бабенка) is a historic-archaeological museum-reserve that is located near the village of Verkhnii Saltiv in Chuhuiv Raion, Kharkiv Oblast, Ukraine. The reserve covers one of the type sites of the Saltovo-Mayaki culture, the main archaeological culture of the Khazars, with the other type site being Mayatskoye. Findings from the Verkhnii Saltiv archaeological complex are mostly displayed in museums of Kyiv, Kharkiv, Odesa, Moscow, Saint Petersburg, and Sofia, while only a small portion of them was kept in the museum in Verkhnii Saltiv.

== History ==
The settlement with traces of fortifications that is located near the village of Verkhnii Saltiv was first mentioned in "Book to the Bolshoy Chertezh" (17th century) as Saltanovskoye. It is located on the high right bank of Pechenih Reservoir on Siverskyi Donets River that rises above the floodplain by 35 m. The area has several defensive lines. The main fortification has the shape of an irregular trapezoid with dimensions 180 × 135 × 160 × 50 m. This territory was protected by a rampart with stone masonry. The settlement adjoins the fortifications from the north, stretching along the reservoir. Therefore, the ensemble of the Verknii Saltiv archaeological complex includes the fortifications, the settlement, four catacomb grave fields, as well as another settlement and Netailivskyi grave field that are located on the other side of the reservoir, opposite to the Verkhnii Saltiv settlement.

In 1900, a local teacher Vasyl Babenko received a request from the Committee of the preparation to the 12th Archaeological Congress to inform about the historical and archaeological monuments around the village of Verkhnii Saltiv. The first search works were carried out by Babenko. During the searches, a grave field was found. This finding prompted the Kharkiv University to send its representatives who confirmed the importance of the settlement. In 1901, archaeological research had begun. The discovery of the Saltiv necropolis caused further research, the result of which was the discovery of other objects in the archaeological complex.

From 1905 to 1927, archaeological commissions of Kharkiv University, Kharkiv Archaeological Museum, Kharkiv Social Museum, Odesa Museum, and Moscow Archaeological Museum have carried out work in the region.

Basic studies of defensive structures began after World War II. In 1946–1948, the scientist S. A. Semenov-Zuser made several cuts of ramparts on all three lines of defense of the ancient fortress and researched several dozens of catacomb burials.

An expedition was formed by the institute of archaeology in 1959 to further research the site. The goal of the expedition was the discovery of new archaeological monuments. As the result, the settlement and the grave field located on the left bank of the reservoir were discovered.

From 1984, Kharkiv Historical Museum systematically sends expeditions to continue investigating Verkhnii Saltiv archaeological complex.

The site has been protected by the government since 21 July 1965 by the decree of the Council of Ministers of Ukrainian SSR. On 15 June 1987, the entire territory of Verkhnii Saltiv archaeological complex was proclaimed a protected reserve. In 1989, the Verkhnii Saltiv historic-archaeological museum-reserve was founded.

The area was under occupation during the Russian invasion of Ukraine. Most of the exposition of the museum was transferred to Kharkiv prior to the occupation. The museum was severely damaged by missiles, and the parts of the archaeological site were mined. In May of 2022, the village of Verkhnii Saltiv was deoccupied.

== Sources ==
- Бражник А. Верхній Салтів: геній місця: Іст.-археол. музей-заповідник «Верхній Салтів»: Путівник / А. Бражник, Н. Бражник, С. Поцілуйко. — Х.: Гімназія-Модем, 2003. — 51 с.: ілюстр. — (Золотий вінець Харківщини).
- Верхній Салтів: Геній Місця (А.Бражник, Н.Бражник, С.Бражник). — Харків: Видавництво «Гімназія Модем», 2004. — 1200с.; іл.
