= Three Wells =

Open-air museum in Subotiv, Ukraine

Coordinates: 49°05′11.8″N 32°32′31.4″E

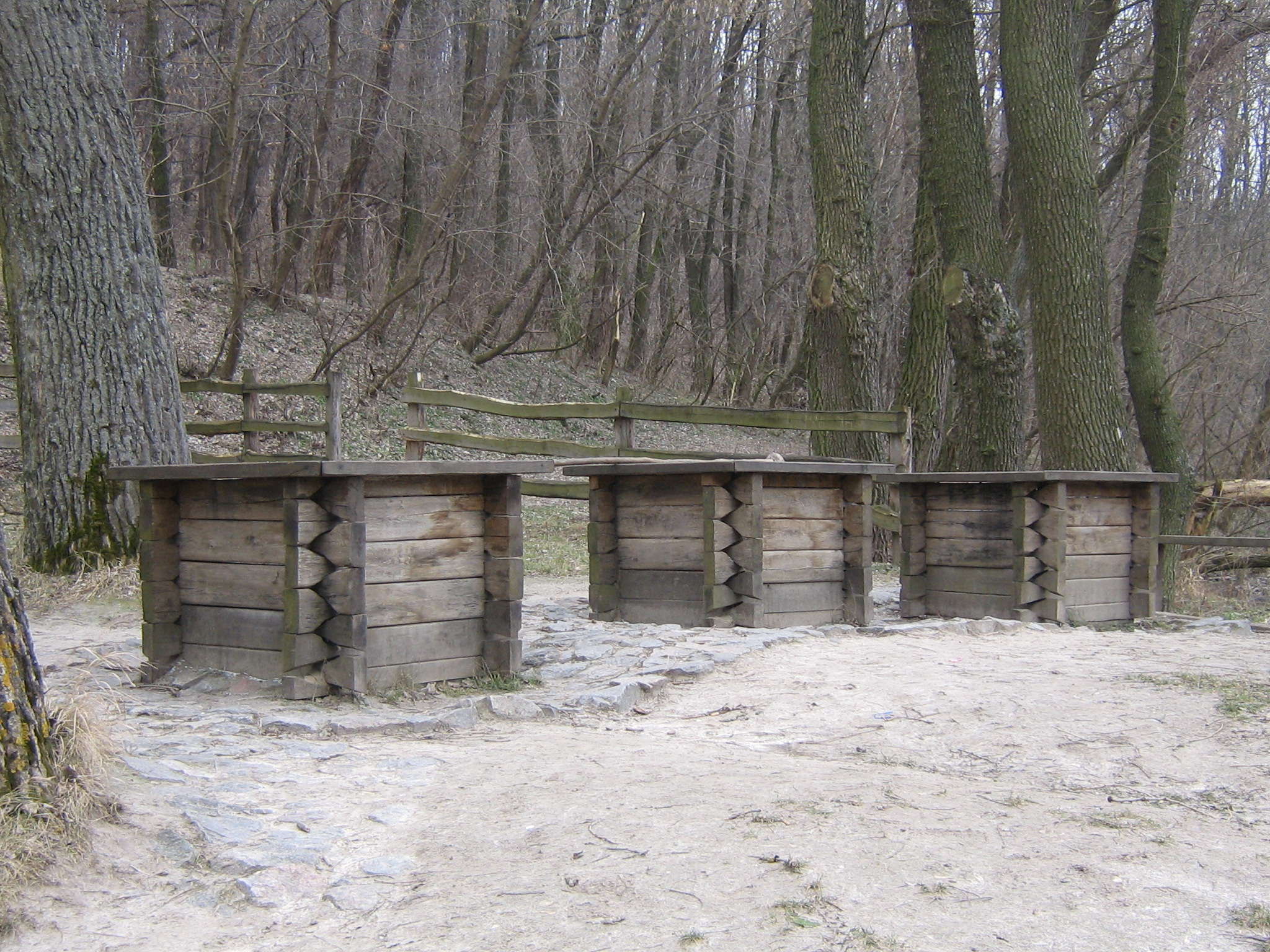
- Three wells
- Interactive map of Three Wells

Immovable Monument of Local Significance of Ukraine
- Official name: Урочище «Три криниці» (Three Wells Tract)
- Type: Landscape
- Reference no.: 126-Чк

Three Wells (Ukrainian: Історико-гідрологічна пам'ятка "Три криниці") is a historical and hydrological monument of local significance in Subotiv village near Chyhyryn, Ukraine. Later it was included into the National Historical-Cultural Reserve "Chyhyryn".

== History ==
Reliable historical documents related to the origin of the sources have not been found, but there are several legend versions.

According to one of the versions, the wells were built during the Khmelnytsky Uprising led by Bohdan Khmelnytsky. Wounded soldiers gathered near Subotiv in the valley near the spring. According to legend, a military hospital was located there. Three horsemen rode into the village with their wounded comrades. On the order of the hetman, they were treated with herbs infused with spring water. When they recovered, they dug wells at the site of the healing springs.

According to another legend, the Cossacks used to water their horses at this place, but there was not enough water in two wells, so Bohdan Khmelnytsky ordered to dig a third one.

In Soviet times, propagandists used the wells as a symbol of the commonwealth of three nations: Ukraine, Russia, and Belarus.

== Gallery ==
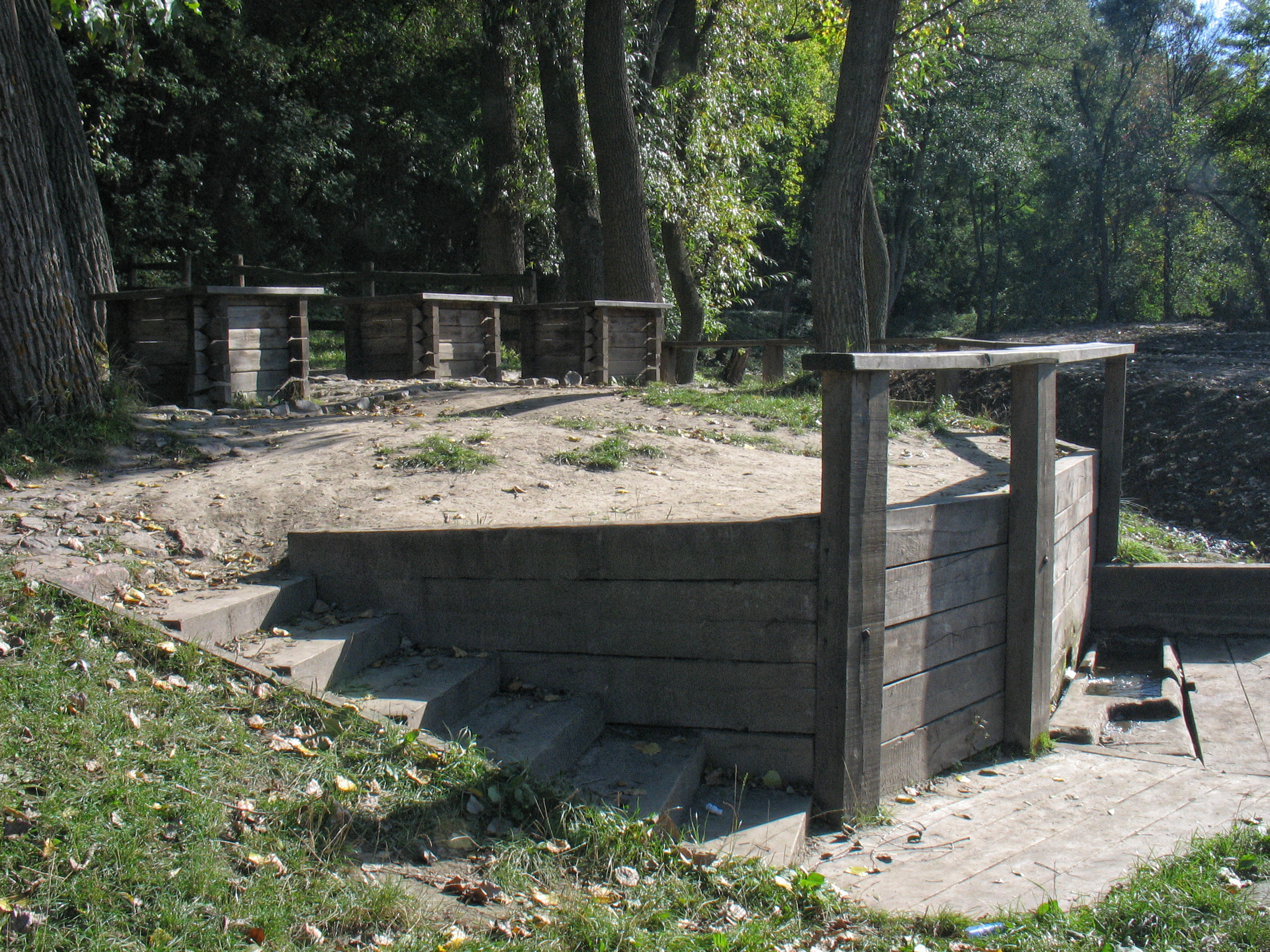

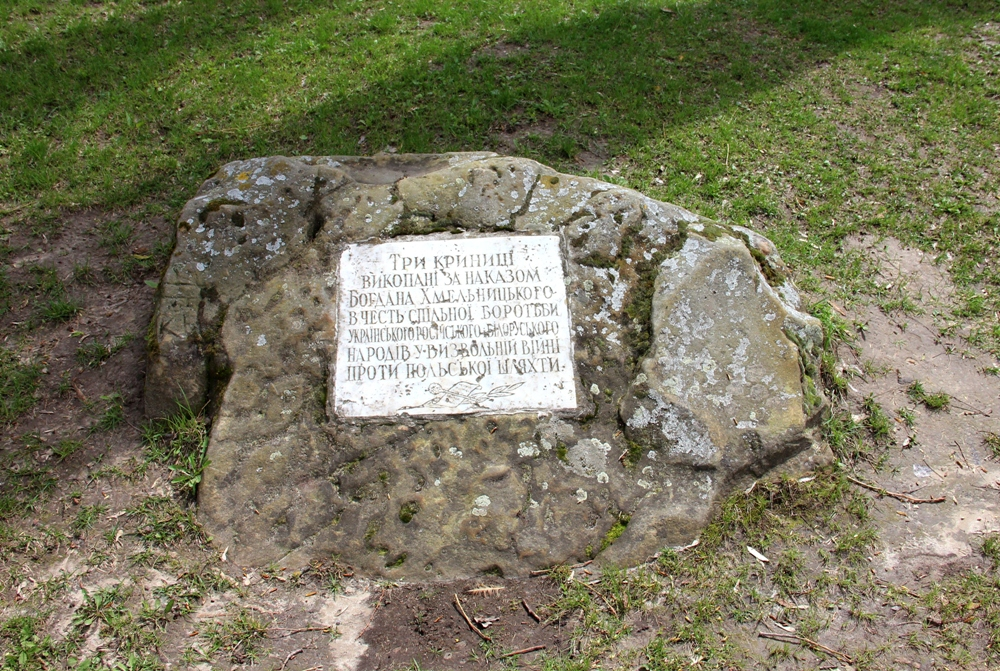
An inscription on a stone near the wells
