= Mayatskoye =

Mayatskoye Mayatskoe, Mayaki
- Historical settlement
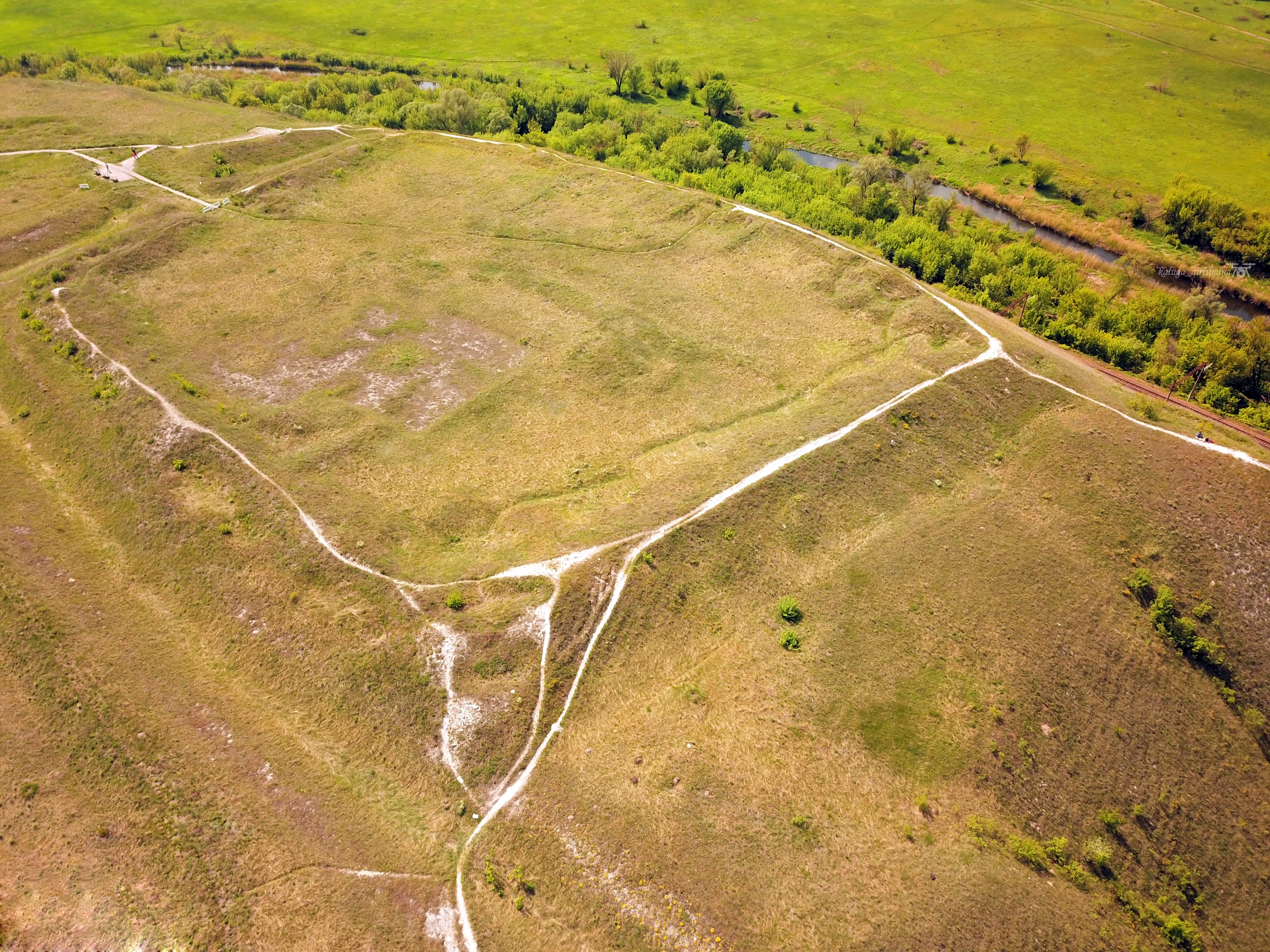

- Location within Voronezh Oblast Location within Russia
- Coordinates: 50.9703°N 39.2929°E
- Country: Russia
- Region: Voronezh Oblast
- District: Liskinsky District
- Time zone: UTC+3:00

Mayatskoye, also known as Mayatskoe or Mayaki, is a gorodishche (hill fort) and historical settlement located in the Divnogorye museum-reserve area of Liskinsky District in Voronezh Oblast, Russia. Along with Verkhnii Saltiv, it gives its name to the Saltovo-Mayaki culture, which is the main archaeological culture of the Khazars. Mayatskoye is the northernmost site associated with the Khazars, and was probably near the frontier with Slavic tribes. It is also one of the best-preserved and best-studied Khazar sites.

The Mayatskoye site consists of a hill fort surrounded by a settlement with an adjacent burial ground. The overall settlement area is 30 hectares, of which 6,000 square meters have been excavated. Remains of pottery workshops have been identified in this area. The fortress itself covers 1.1 hectare, and about 30% of the area enclosed by its walls has been excavated. The walls themselves have been excavated in small portions; most of their circuit remains buried under earthen ramparts. The walls were made of chalk blocks, some of which contain runic inscriptions, and reached about 1.5 to 2 meters in height. As for the cemetery area, it covers 3 hectares, of which 2874 square meters (about 10%) have been excavated. At least 150 individual burial sites have been identified.

The settlement existed from the late 8th century onward; its citadel was built in the 9th century. The settlement was especially important during the second half of the 9th century and the early 10th century. Among its inhabitants were Alans. A Common Turkic inscription found at the site refers to the "As country" and "our land of the Six-Savirs", which Gábor Hosszú interprets as a reference to the Khazars ruling over the area between the Don and Dnieper rivers. The inscription identifies the building as "the mansion of Onagh Tegin", its builder as Ud Didü On, and the author of the inscription as Ineg.

== History of study ==
The first archaeological findings at Mayatskoye were in 1890. The first comprehensive archaeological excavations were undertaken by A. Milyutin in 1906 and then N. Makarenko in 1908-09. Plowing in the 1960s disturbed part of the site's eastern part but does not appear to have damaged the pits marking the site of old buildings. Further excavations were undertaken by a joint Soviet, Bulgarian, and Hungarian project in 1975 and then 1977-82. The burial ground was discovered in 1975.
