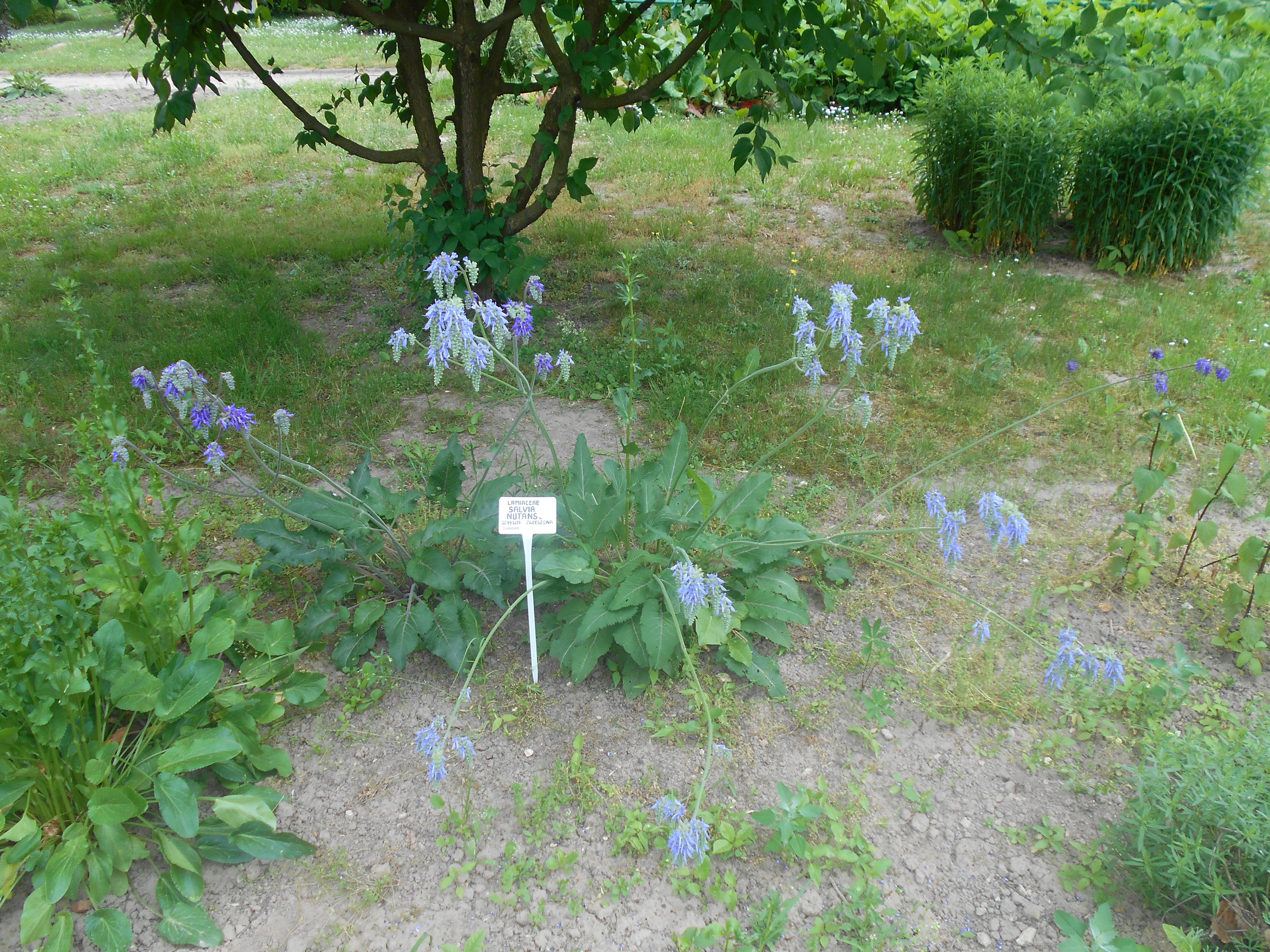
- In bloom at the Botanical Garden of Maria Curie-Skłodowska University
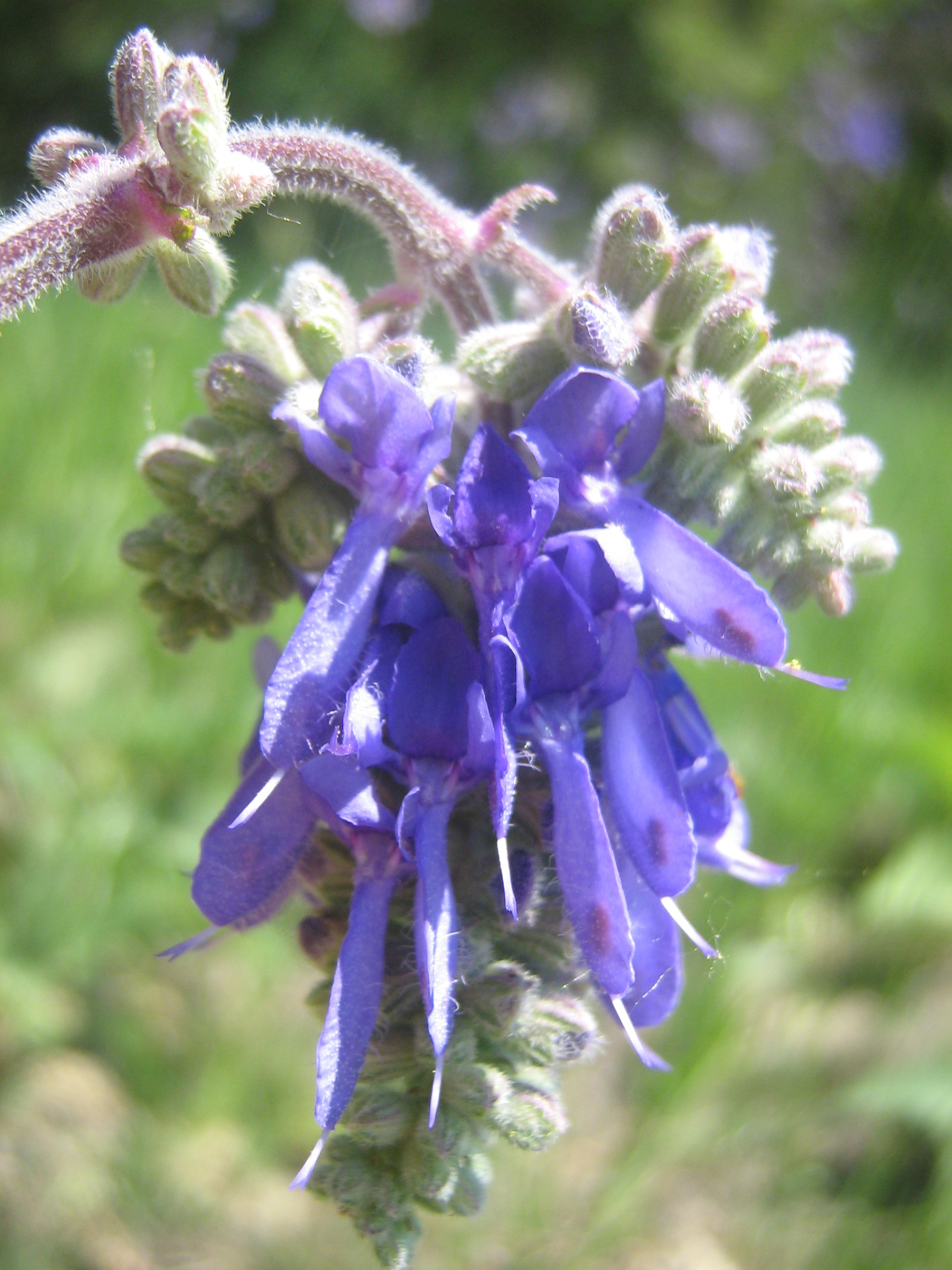
- Close up of flowers

Scientific classification
- Kingdom: Plantae
- Clade: Tracheophytes
- Clade: Angiosperms
- Clade: Eudicots
- Clade: Asterids
- Order: Lamiales
- Family: Lamiaceae
- Genus: Salvia
- Species: S. nutans

Binomial name
- Salvia nutans L.

= Salvia nutans =

Species of plant in the mint family

Salvia nutans, nodding sage, is a species of Salvia in the family Lamiaceae, native to Central and Eastern Europe, the Caucasus, and possibly Siberia. It has been introduced into North America as a garden escapee.
