= Cossack Village (Stetsivka) =

Open-air museum in Ukraine

Coordinates: 49°00′53.7″N 32°47′50.6″E

- Скансен «Козацький хутір»
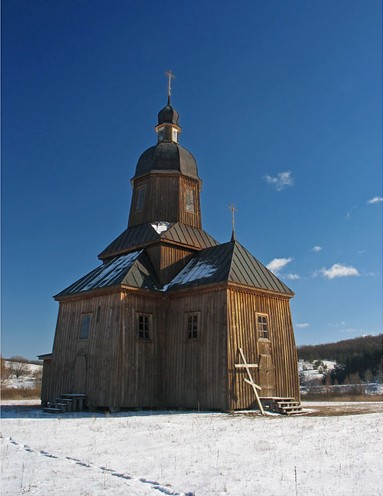
- Location: Stetsivka, Cherkasy Oblast, Ukraine
- Type: Protected area

Cossack Village and St. Nicholas's Church (Ukrainian: Туристично-етнографічний комплекс "Козацький хутір" та церква Св. Миколая XVIII ст.) is an open-air museum of Cossack culture in Ukraine. It was founded in 2005 and belongs to the National Historical and Cultural Reserve "Chyhyryn".

The museum was created for the National Historical and Cultural Preserve Chyhyryn. It is located in Stetsivka, 240 kilometres southeast of Kyiv, in Cherkasy Oblast. The area of the museum is 9 hectares.

== Gallery ==
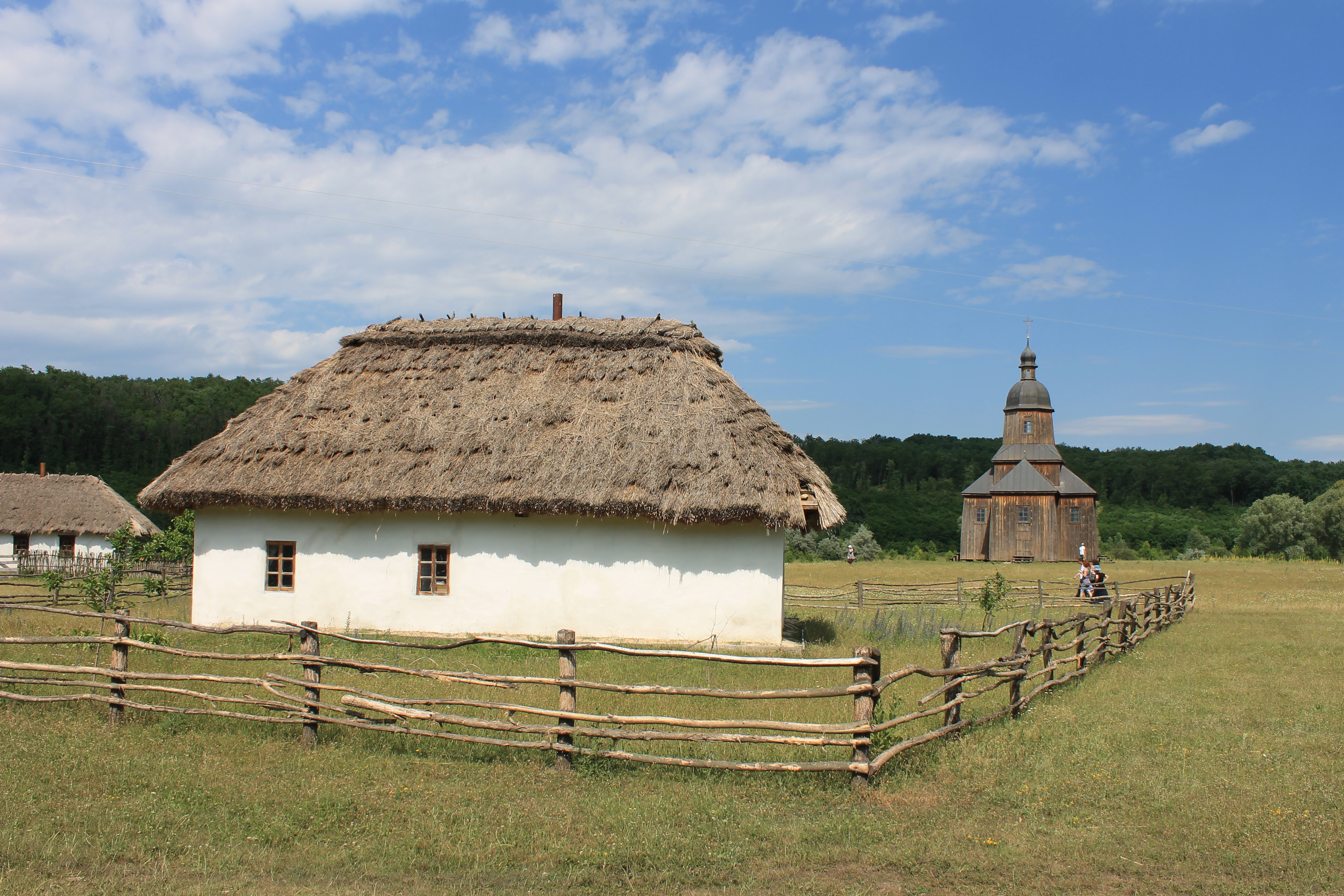

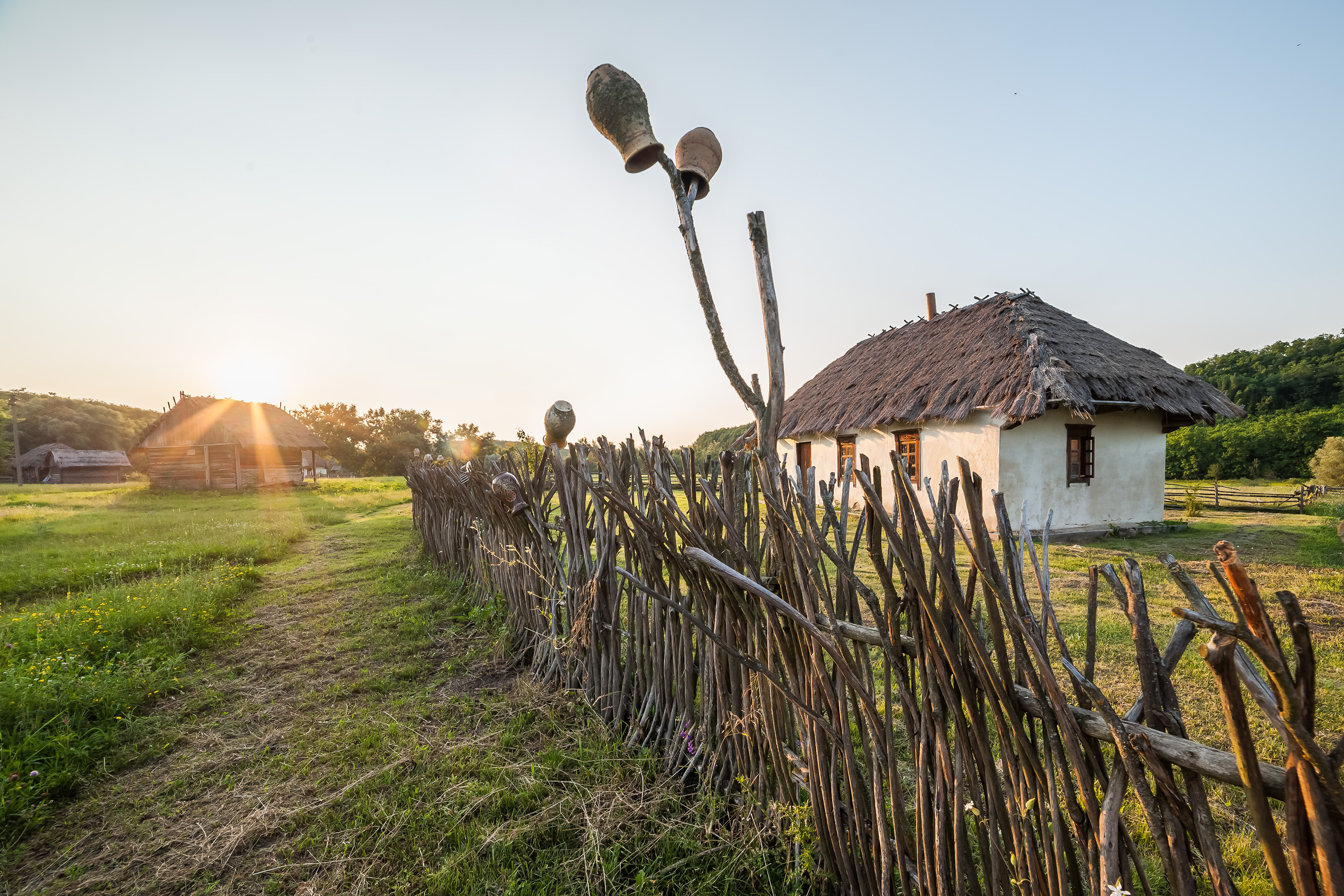

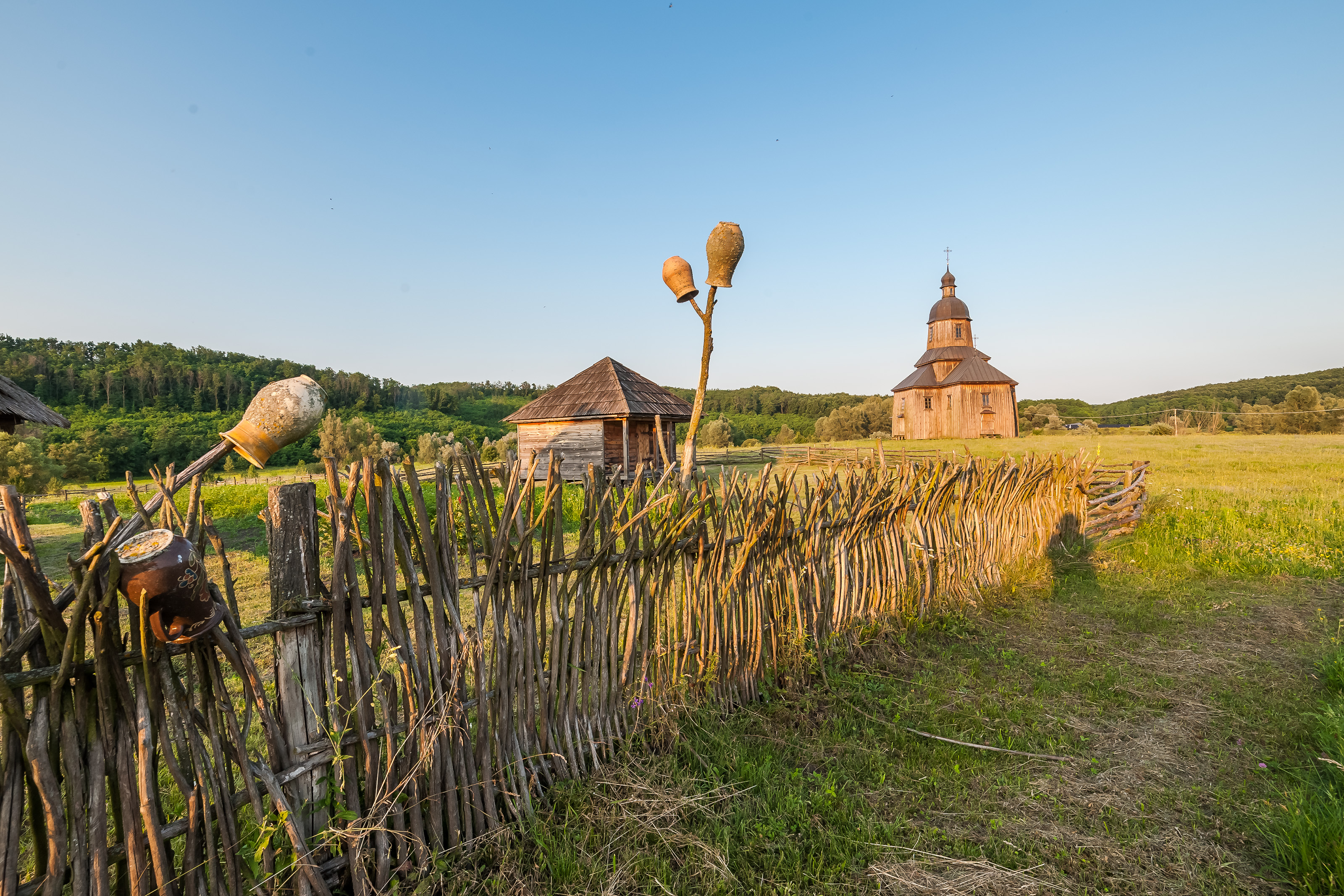

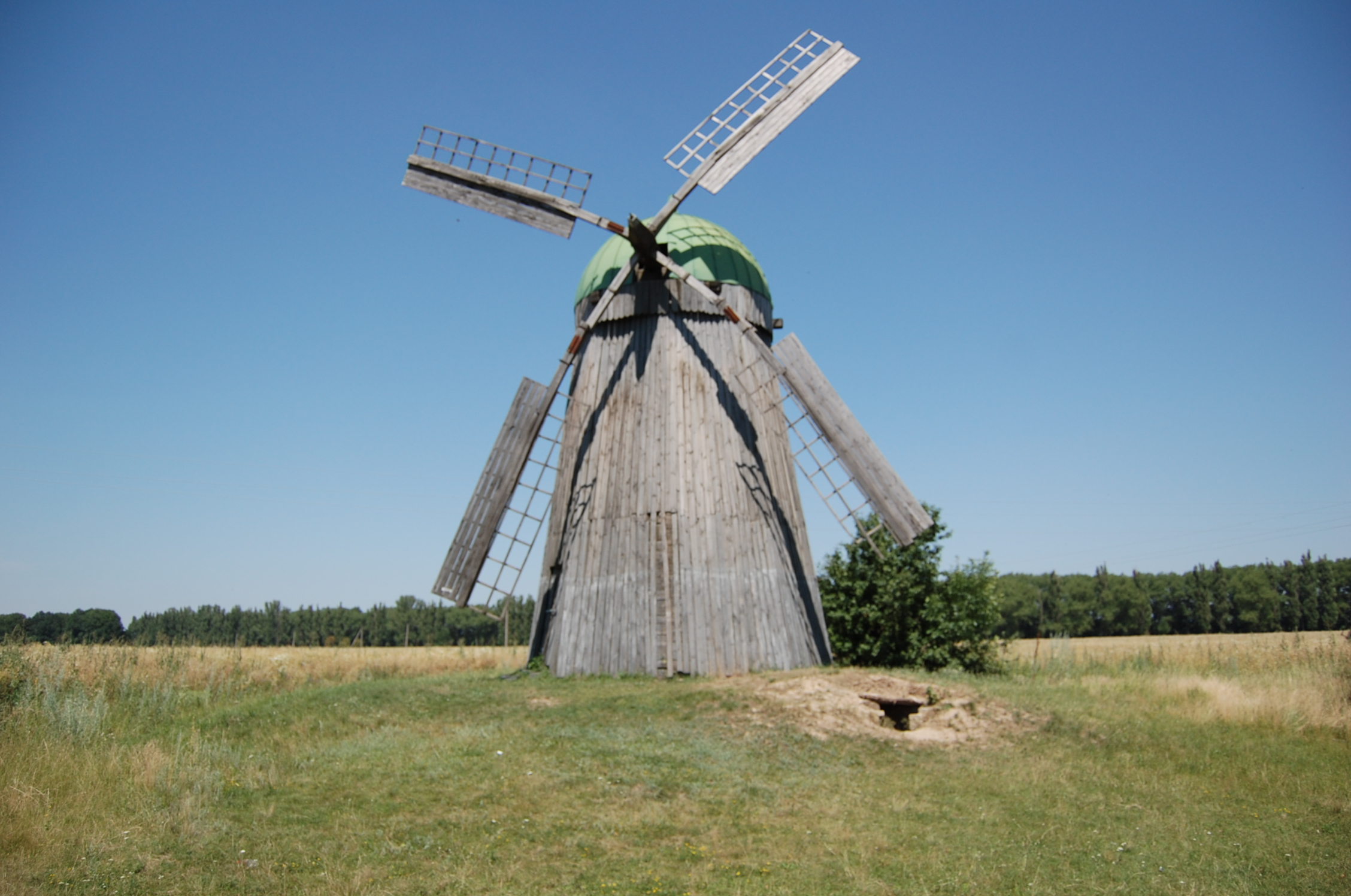
