= State Register of Immovable Monuments of Ukraine =

Register of sites protected as heritage monuments by the law of Ukraine

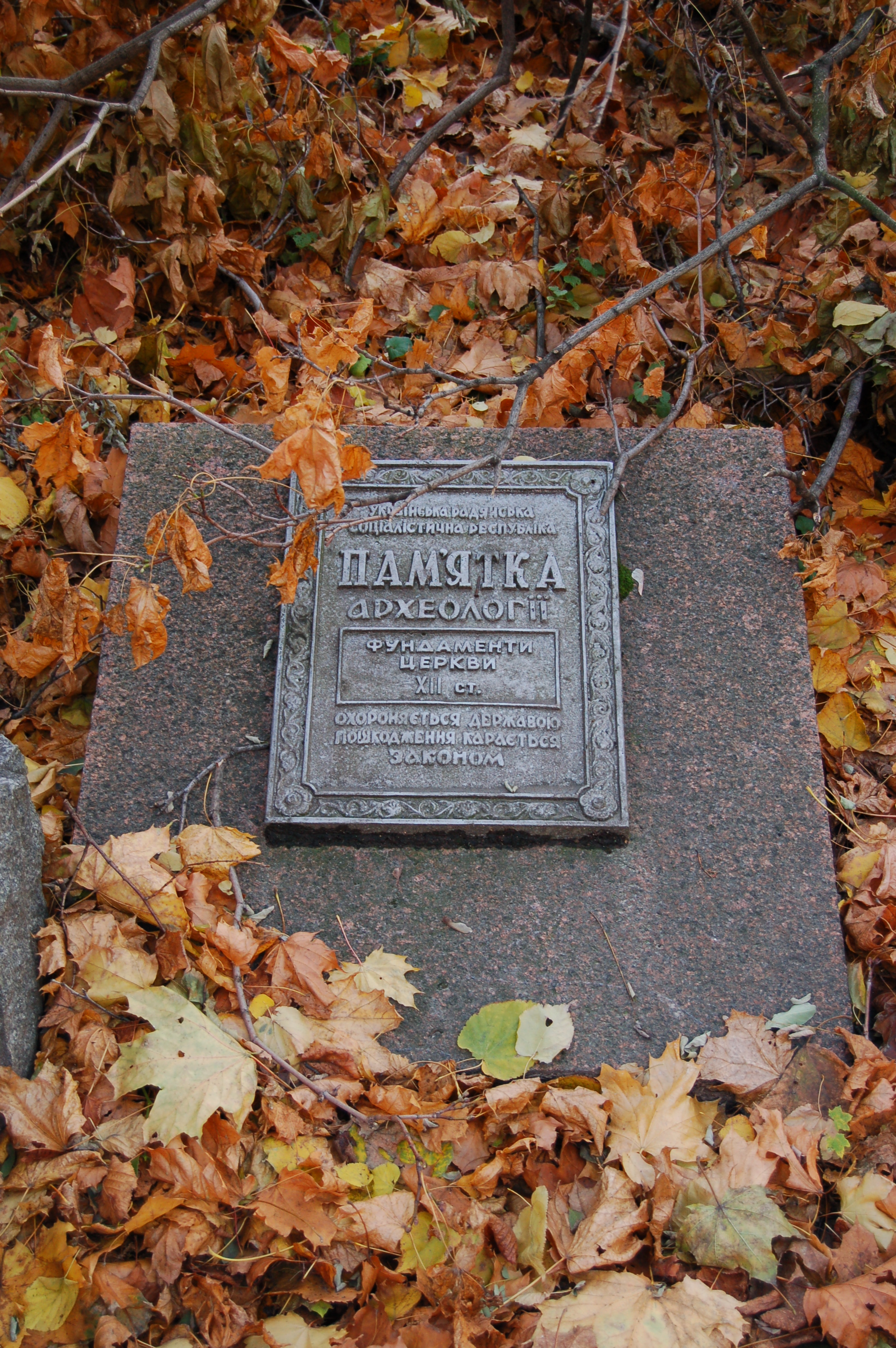
Ukrainian SSR

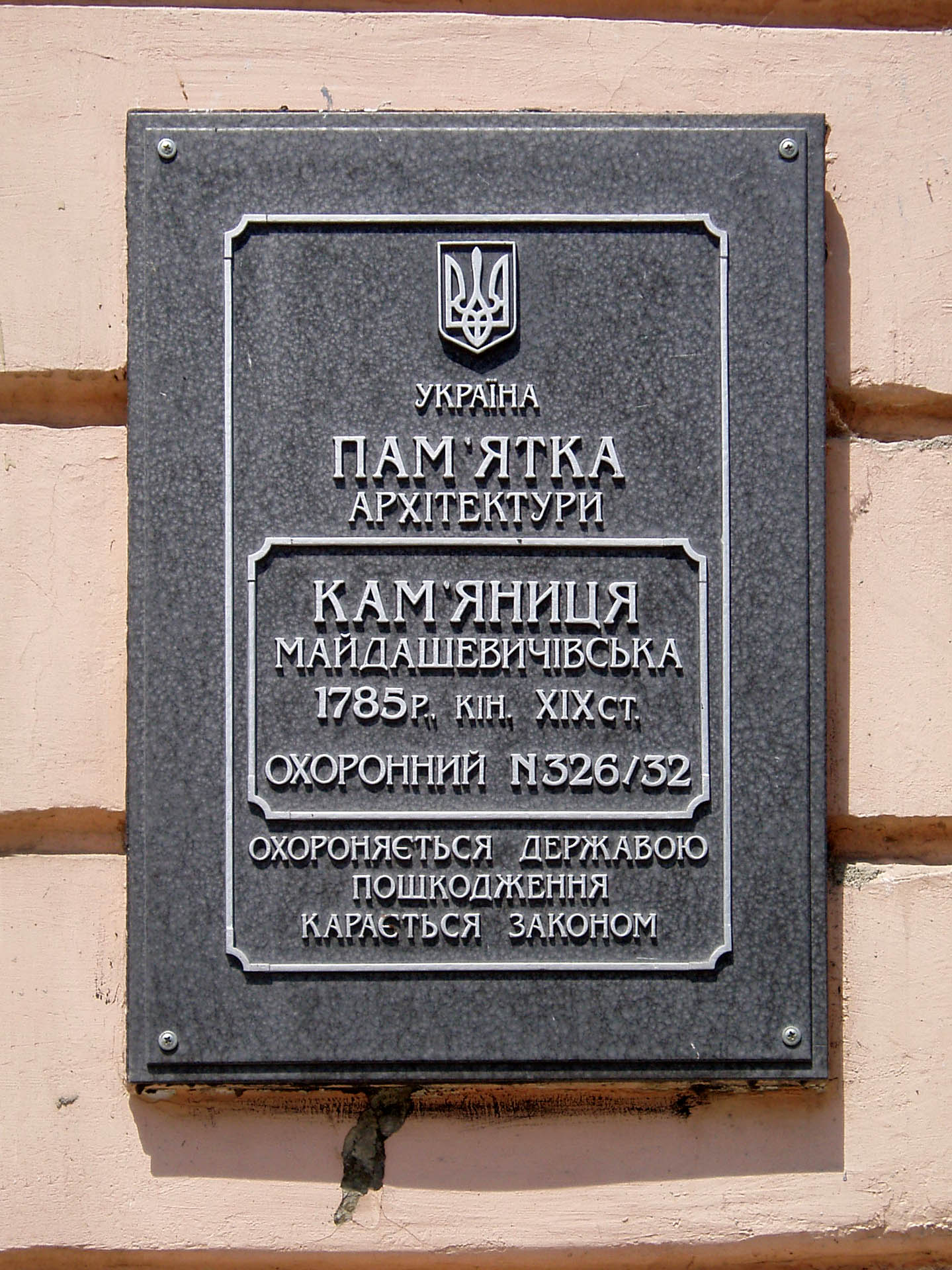
Ukraine

Examples of Ukrainian cultural heritage plaques

The State Register of Immovable (Tangible) Monuments of Ukraine (Ukrainian: Державний реєстр нерухомих пам'яток України, romanized: Derzhavnyi reiestr nerukhomykh pamiatok Ukrainy) is a register of around 25,000 objects of cultural heritage in Ukraine. An object of cultural heritage added to the register is known as a monument.

== Overview ==
The registry was established as early as 1960s. It was established according to article 5 of the second protocol to the Hague Convention for the Protection of Cultural Property in the Event of Armed Conflict, which provides for the establishment of national registers of cultural property.

The list is split by regions including cities with special status. There are two types of lists of immovable monuments: national significance and of local significance. The items are also classified as monuments of archaeology, history, monumental art, architecture, urban planning, garden-park art, landscape, science and technology, or any combination of the above.

Since February 2022, the Heritage Emergency Fund and UNESCO have worked together to catalog damage and losses to listed monuments, as well as tentative monuments, through remote monitoring of satellite imagery.

== See also ==
- List of historic reserves in Ukraine
