= Saltovo-Mayaki =

700–950 AD archaeological culture in the Pontic steppe

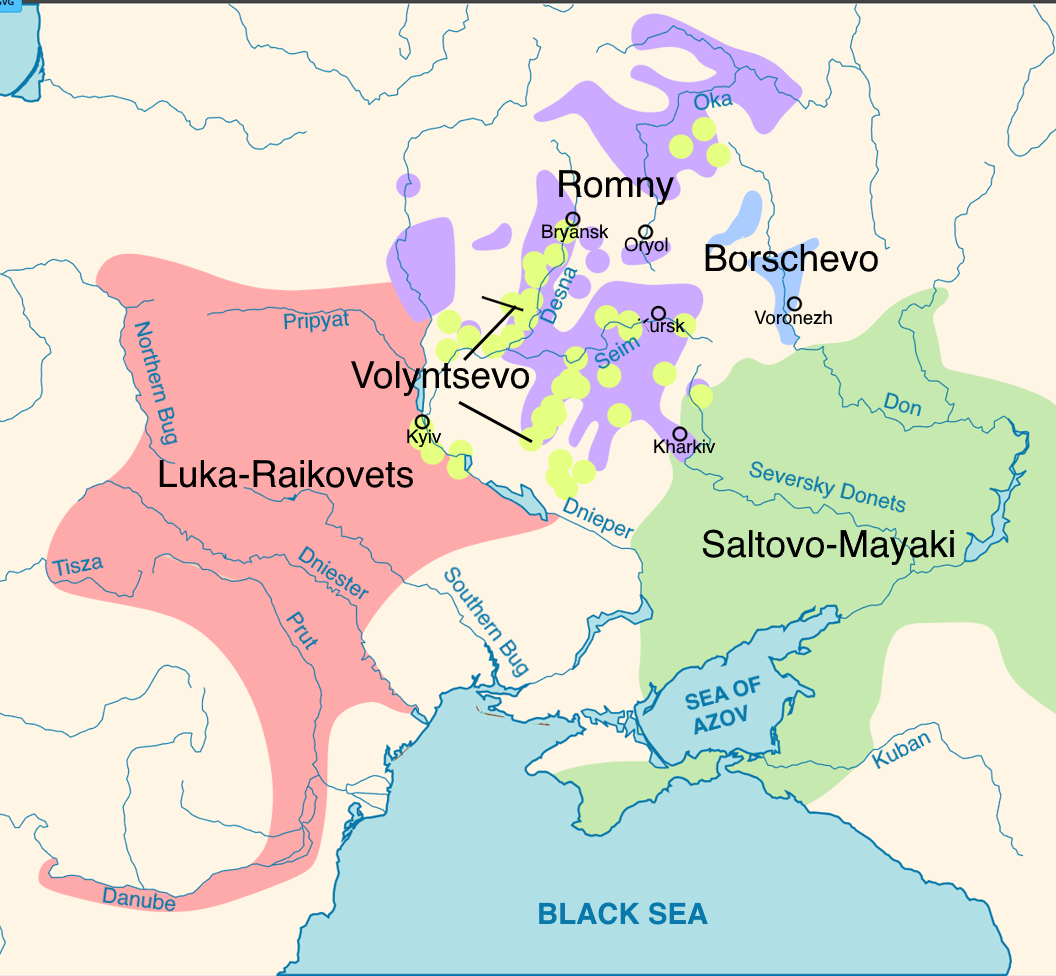
The range of Saltovo-Mayaki culture marked in green.

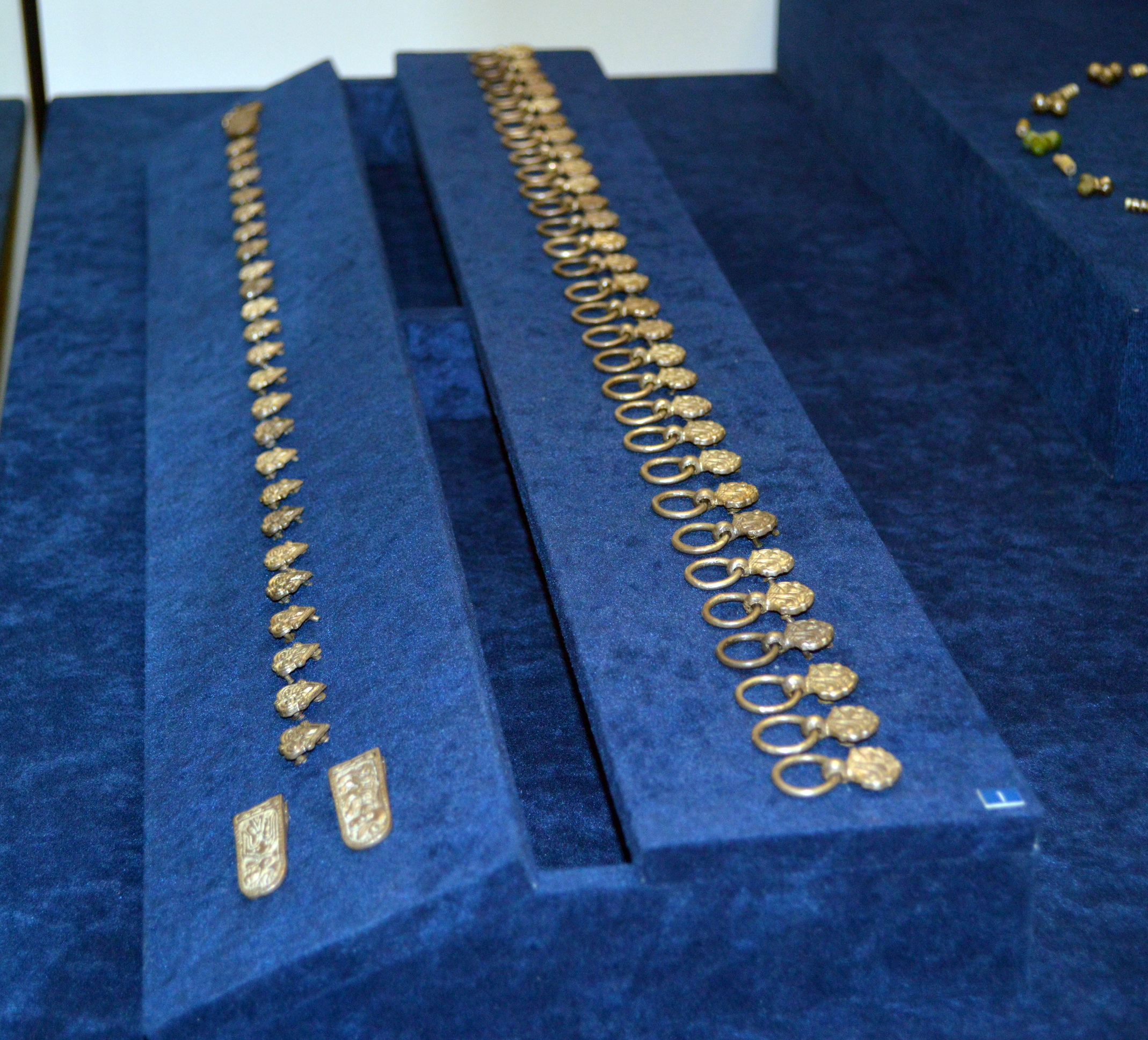
Saltovo-Mayaki belt decorations.

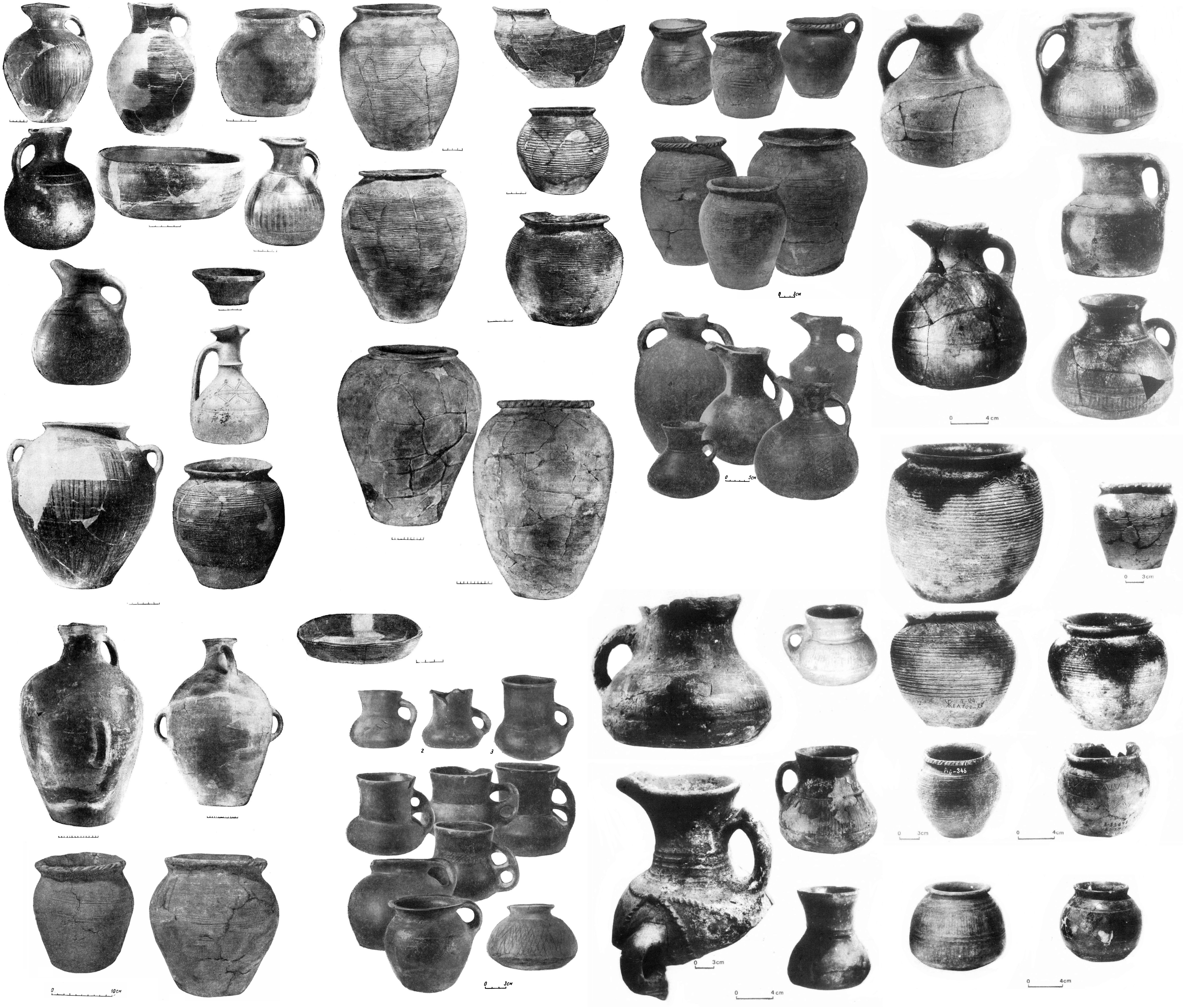
Saltovo-Mayaki pottery.

Saltovo-Mayaki, also known as Saltovo-Majaki or simply Saltiv, is the name given by archaeologists to the early medieval culture of the Pontic steppe region roughly between the Don and the Dnieper Rivers, flourishing roughly between the years of 700 and 950. The culture's type sites are Mayatskoye (a.k.a. Mayaki) near the Don and Verkhnii Saltiv by the Donets.

== History ==
Saltovo-Mayaki influence was strong in the area of the Volyntsevo culture to the northwest of the main Saltovo-Mayaki territory. There's a scholarly debate on the identification of the culture with a particular ethnic group, but is generally associated with the Eastern European steppe nomads (Alans, Bulgars and Khazars or Khazar Khaganate).

== Characteristics ==
The Saltovo-Mayaki material culture was "fairly uniform" across the various tribes.

== Genetics ==
A genetic study published in Nature in May 2018 examined three males of the Saltovo-Mayaki culture buried in Belgorod Oblast, Russia between ca. 700 AD and 900 AD. The sample of Y-DNA extracted belonged to haplogroup R1. The three samples of mtDNA extracted belonged to the haplogroups I, J1b4 and U7a4.

== Sources ==
- Damgaard, P. B.; et al. (May 9, 2018). "137 ancient human genomes from across the Eurasian steppes". Nature. 557 (7705). Nature Research: 369–373. Bibcode:2018Natur.557..369D. doi:10.1038/s41586-018-0094-2. hdl:1887/3202709. PMID 29743675. S2CID 13670282.
