= Kaniv Hills =

Hill range in Ukraine

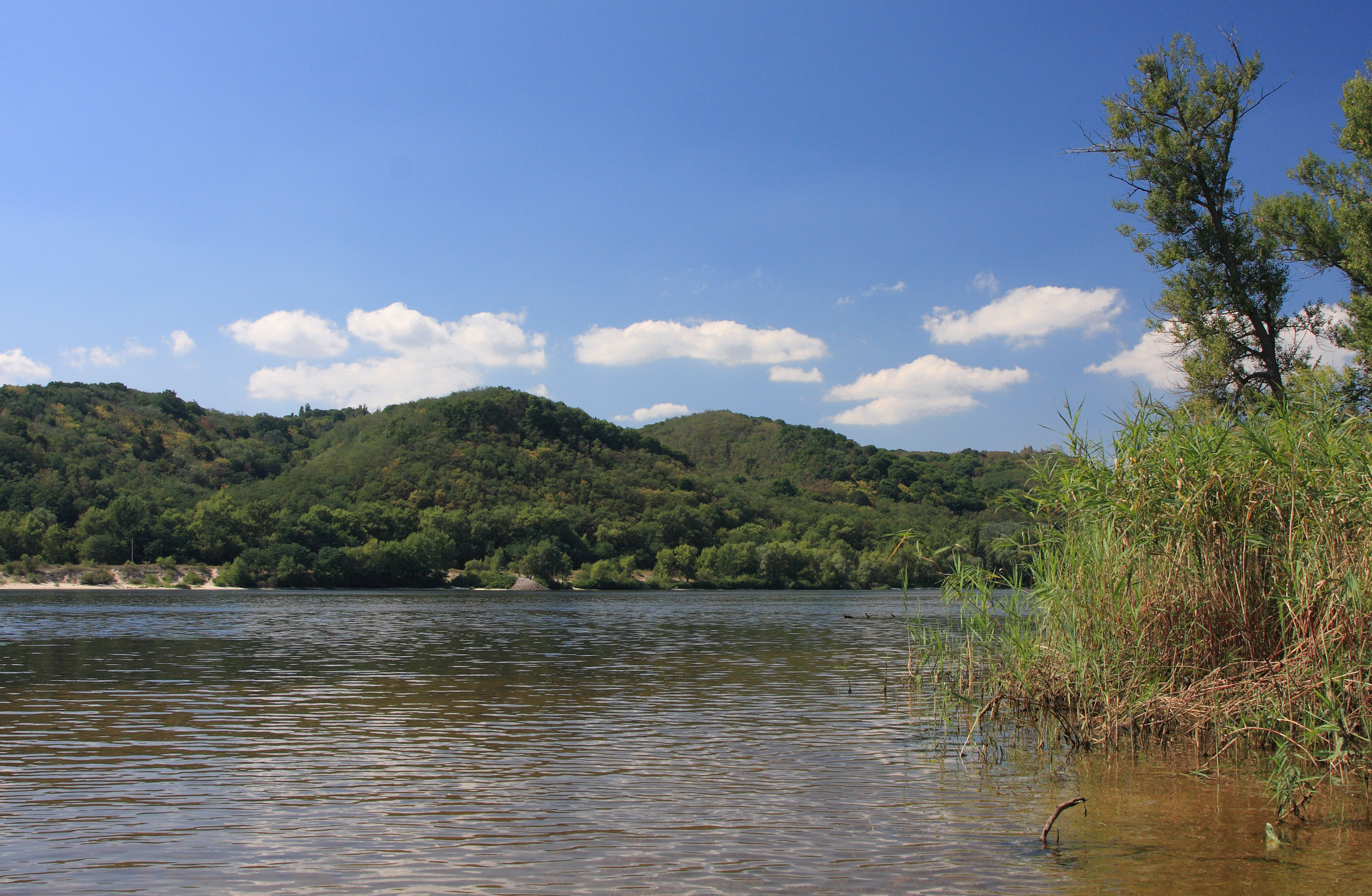
A view on Kaniv Hills from the Dnieper

Kaniv Hills (Ukrainian: Канівські гори) is a hill range forming the eastern edge of the Dnieper Upland. With the length of 70 kilometers and width ranging from 3 to 9 kilometers, the massif extends from Trakhtemyriv to the mouth of Ros river and is clearly separated from the rest of the upland. The hills reach heights from 80 to 255 meters and fall steeply down to the Dnieper river.

== Geology ==
The hills consist of Tertiary, Triassic and Cretaceous strata, which were dislocated by the glacier once covering the Dnieper valley, and are dissected with numerous ravines.

== Flora and fauna ==
The massif's slopes are covered with beech, hornbeam and pine forests. Located in the forest steppe area, Kaniv Hills are home to a rich fauna, including wolves, boars, otters, badgers, martens and beavers.

== Points of interest ==
Kaniv Hills contain the Kaniv Nature Reserve and the Shevchenko National Reserve, where the grave of Taras Shevchenko is located.

== Gallery ==
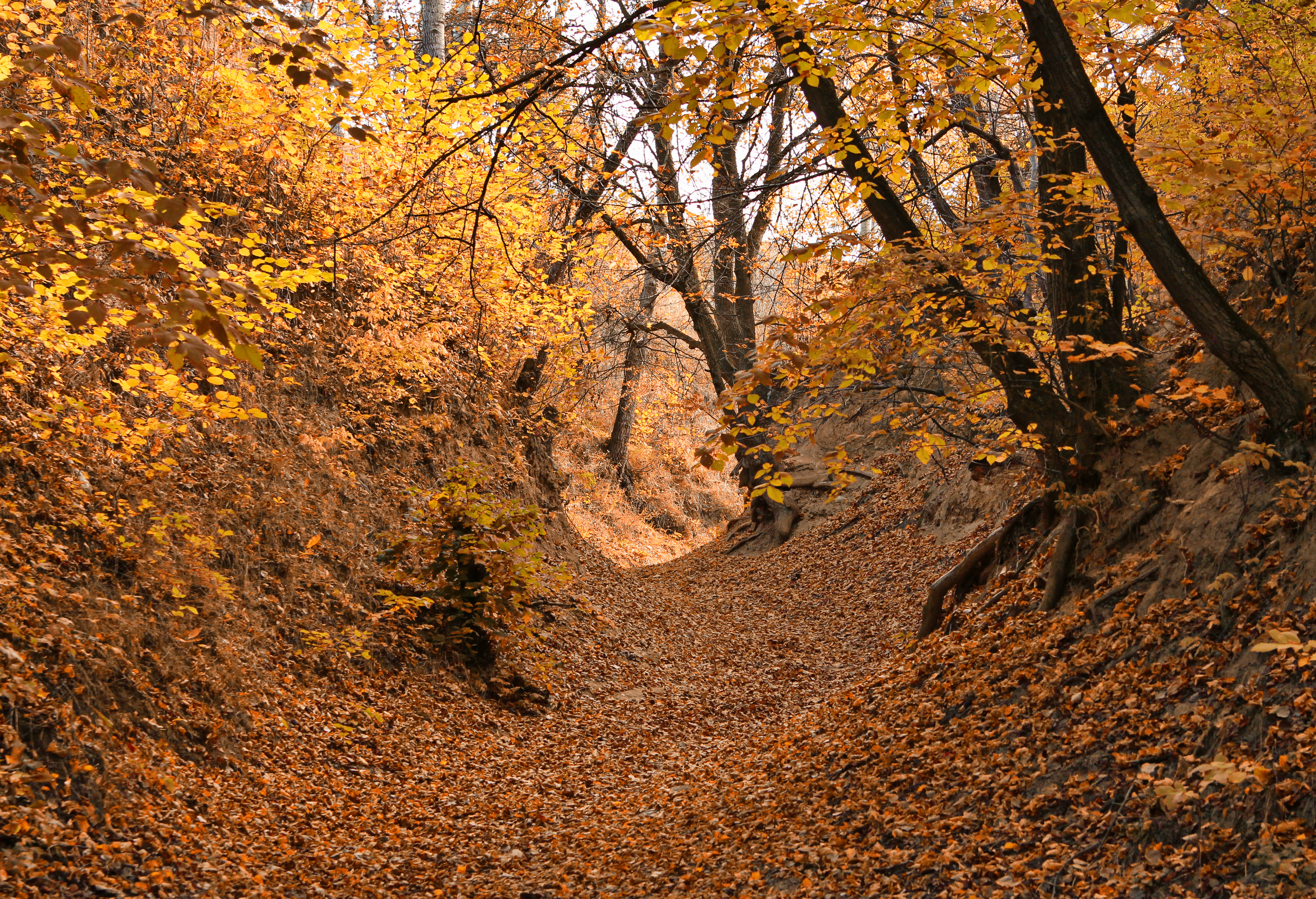
A ravine in Kaniv Hills

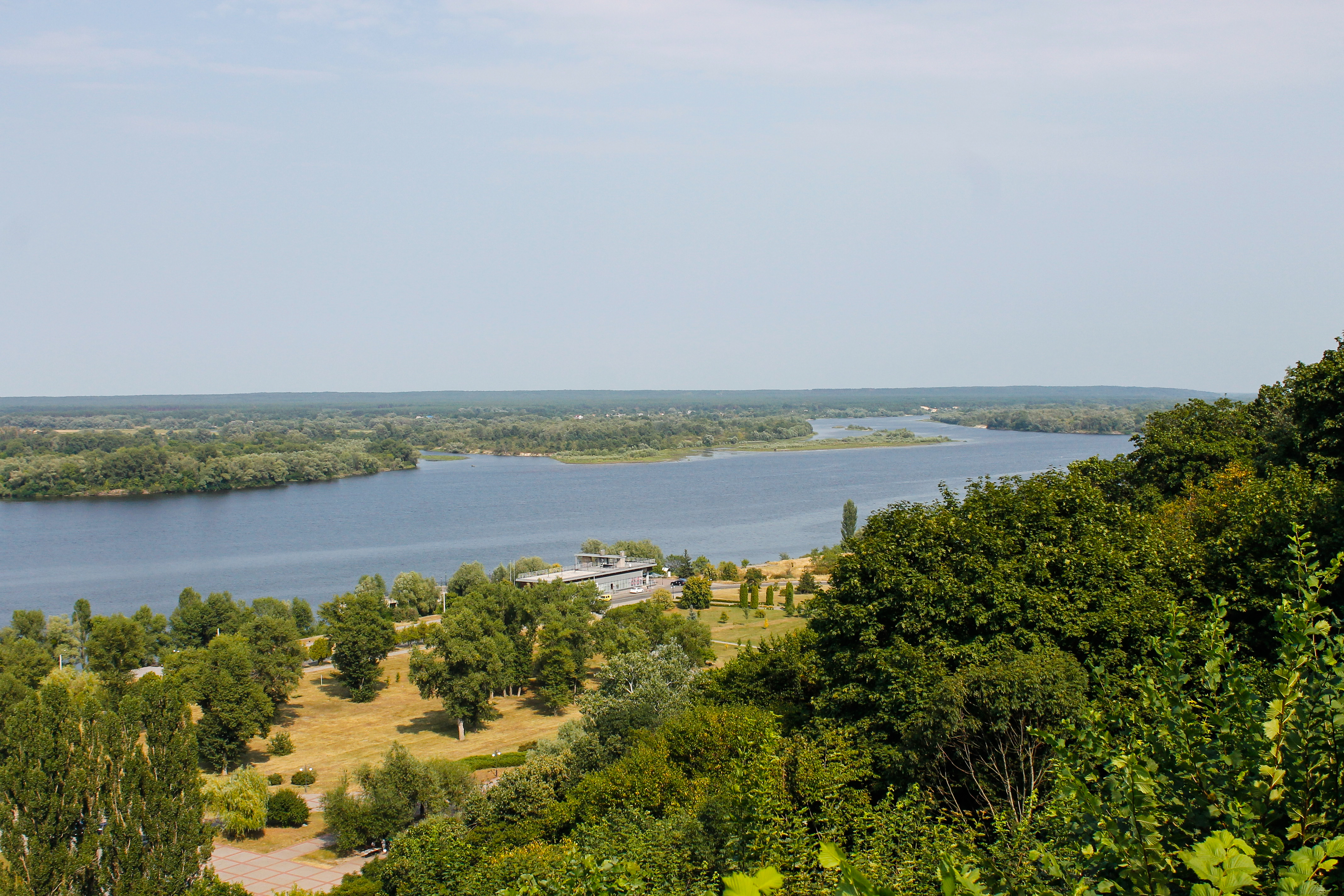
A view on the Dnieper from the grave of Taras Shevchenko

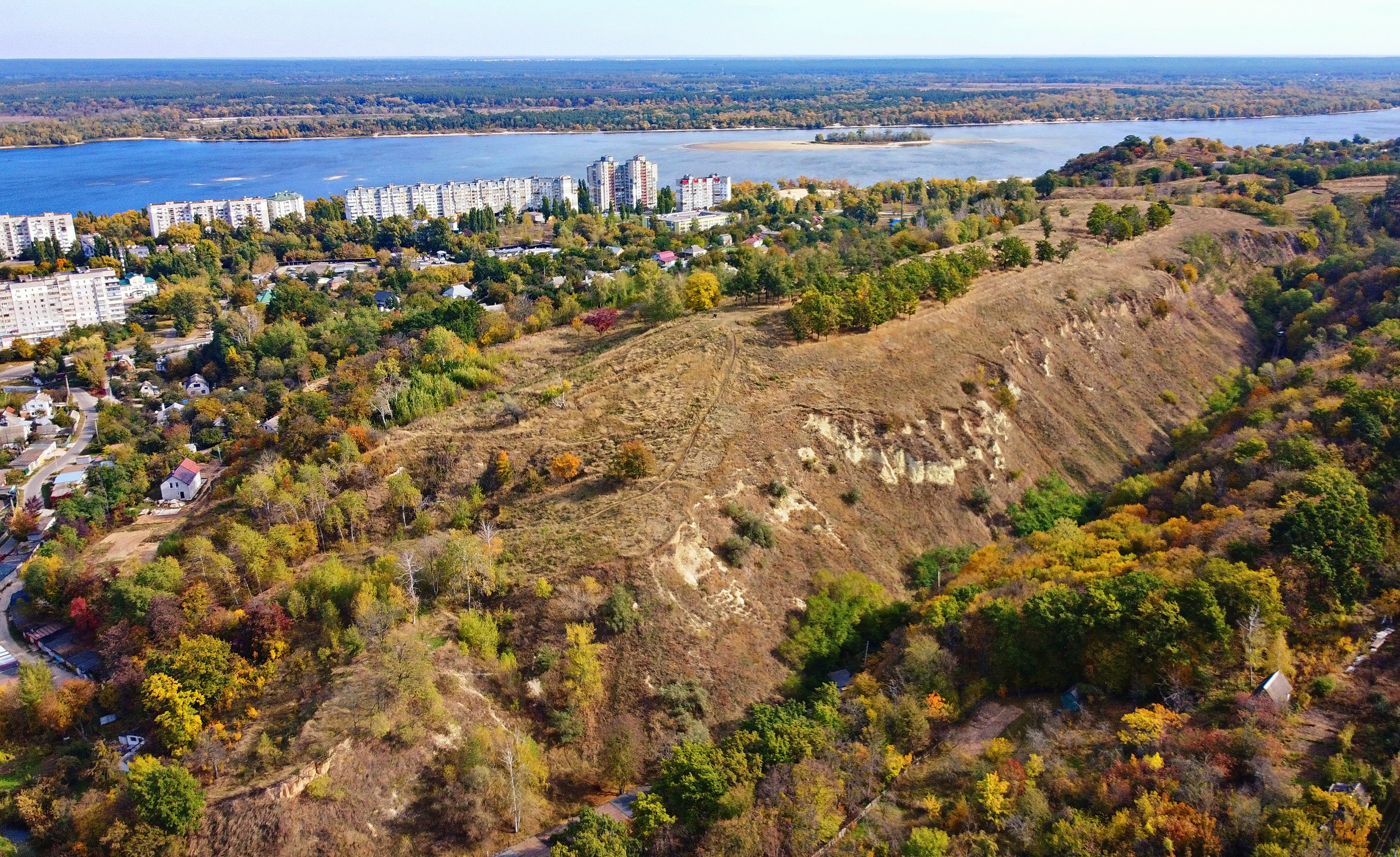
Honcharykha hill near Kaniv

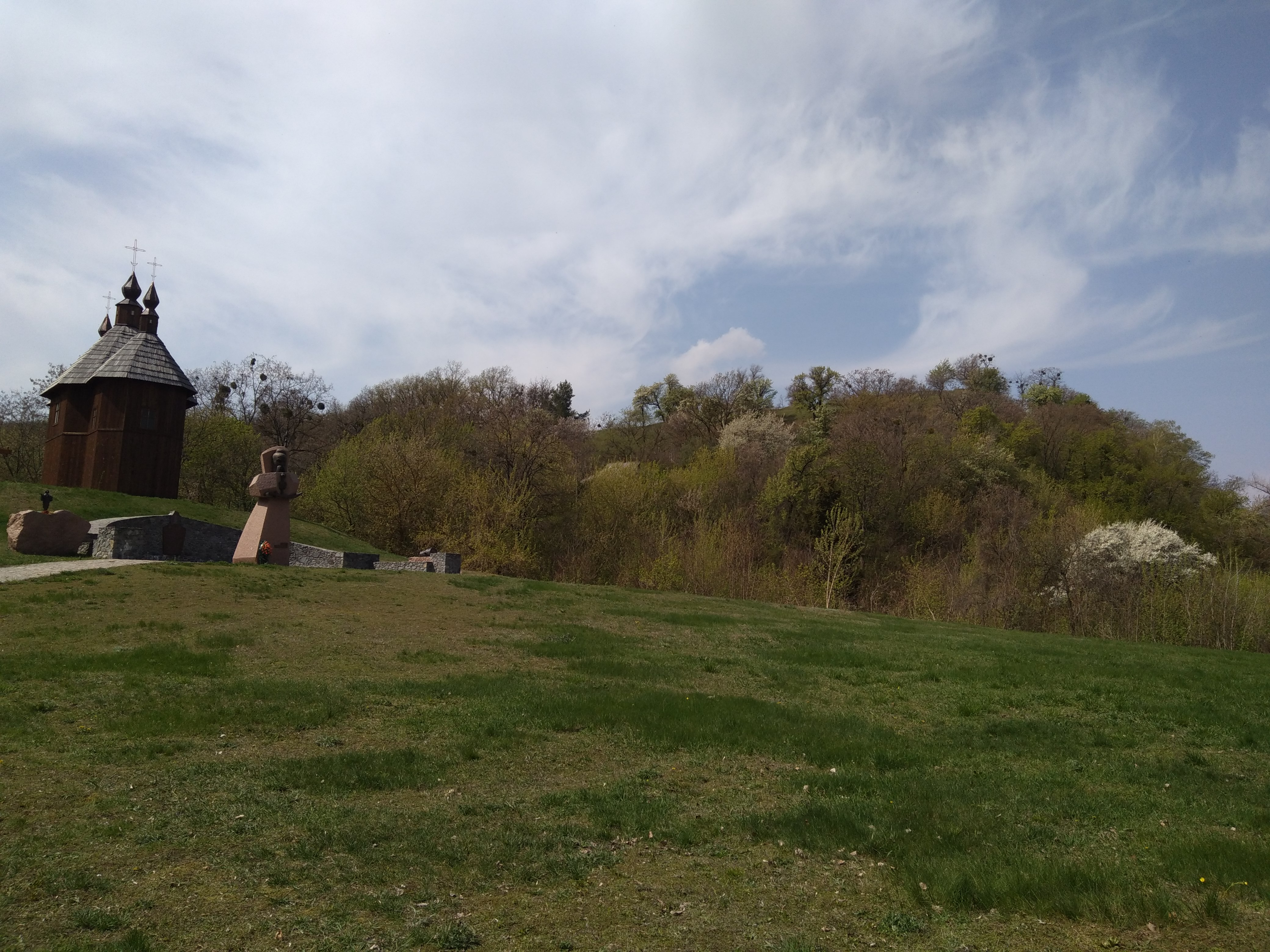
Pylypenkova Hill
