= St. George's Cathedral, Kaniv =

Coordinates: 49.7523°N 31.4600°E

St. George's Cathedral
- Dormition Cathedral
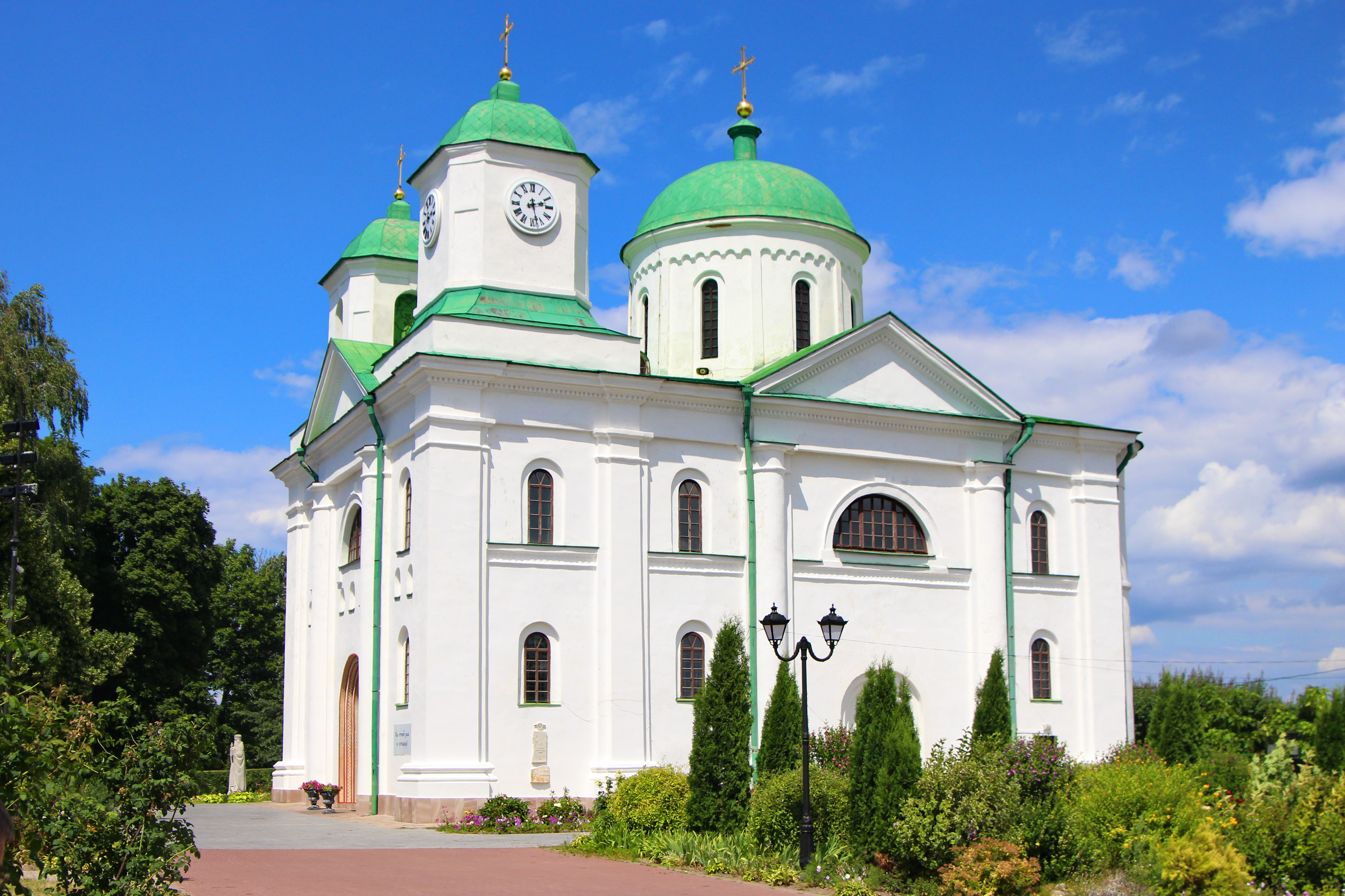
- St. George's Cathedral
- Location: Kaniv
- Address: Heroiv Nebesnoi Sotni Street, 62
- Country: Ukraine
- Denomination: Orthodox Church of Ukraine
- Previous denomination: Ukrainian Orthodox Church (Moscow Patriarchate)

Architecture
- Years built: 1144 (original); 1805–1810 (reconstruction)

Immovable Monument of National Significance of Ukraine
- Official name: Успенський (Георгіївський) собор (Dormition (St. George's) Cathedral)
- Type: Archaeology, History
- Reference no.: 230014-Н

Immovable Monument of National Significance of Ukraine
- Official name: Успенський собор (Dormition Cathedral)
- Type: Architecture
- Reference no.: 230065

Dormition St. George's Cathedral (Ukrainian: Успенський собор Святого Георгія) or St. George's Cathedral (Ukrainian: Георгіївський собор) is a church in Kaniv, Ukraine, originally built in the pre-Mongol period, making it the oldest building in Cherkasy Oblast.

== History ==
An underground monastery may have existed in Kaniv in 1090s. However, the first church of the city, St. George's Cathedral, was built in 1144. The construction was carried out by the order of Vsevolod II during the Kievan Rus' era. It was damaged in 1240 during the Mongol invasion of Kievan Rus'. The cathedral stood partially ruined until its limited restoration in the 16th century when Kaniv was under the Cossack Hetmanate. During the Cossack period, the church was turned into a monastery. The cathedral was burned and damaged during a Crimean Tatar raid on September 4, 1678. St. George's Cathedral was rebuilt in 1805–1810 in a neoclassicist style, incorporating parts of the original building. The cathedral belonged to the Order of Saint Basil until 1833, when it was returned to the Orthodox church. In 1846 it was re-consecrated as the Dormition Cathedral. In 1861, Taras Shevchenko's remains were stored in the cathedral for two days before his re-burial on the Monk's Hill nearby.

The Dormition Cathedral was closed in 1935 under the Soviet Union and turned into a storehouse. Restoration works were carried out in 1966–1970, after which the building became a museum of folk art. After the independence of Ukraine, the ownership of the cathedral was transferred to the Ukrainian Orthodox Church of the Moscow Patriarchate. In 2003, the executive committee of the Kaniv City Council allowed UOC-MP to extend the ownership. In 2024, the court ruled that the privatization of the building was illegal, and the cathedral was transferred to the Orthodox Church of Ukraine soon after.

== Architecture ==
St. George's Cathedral has one dome, three naves, six columns, and three apses. The walls of the Kievan Rus' period are made of brick, but are plastered from both inside and outside. The original cathedral is of the Byzantine type, while later additions introduce neoclassicist elements to the building. Two rectangular sections of the wall are devoid of plaster on the outside to demonstrate the original brick structure, similarly to the walls of the Saint Sophia Cathedral in Kyiv or the Transfiguration Cathedral in Chernihiv.

== Gallery ==
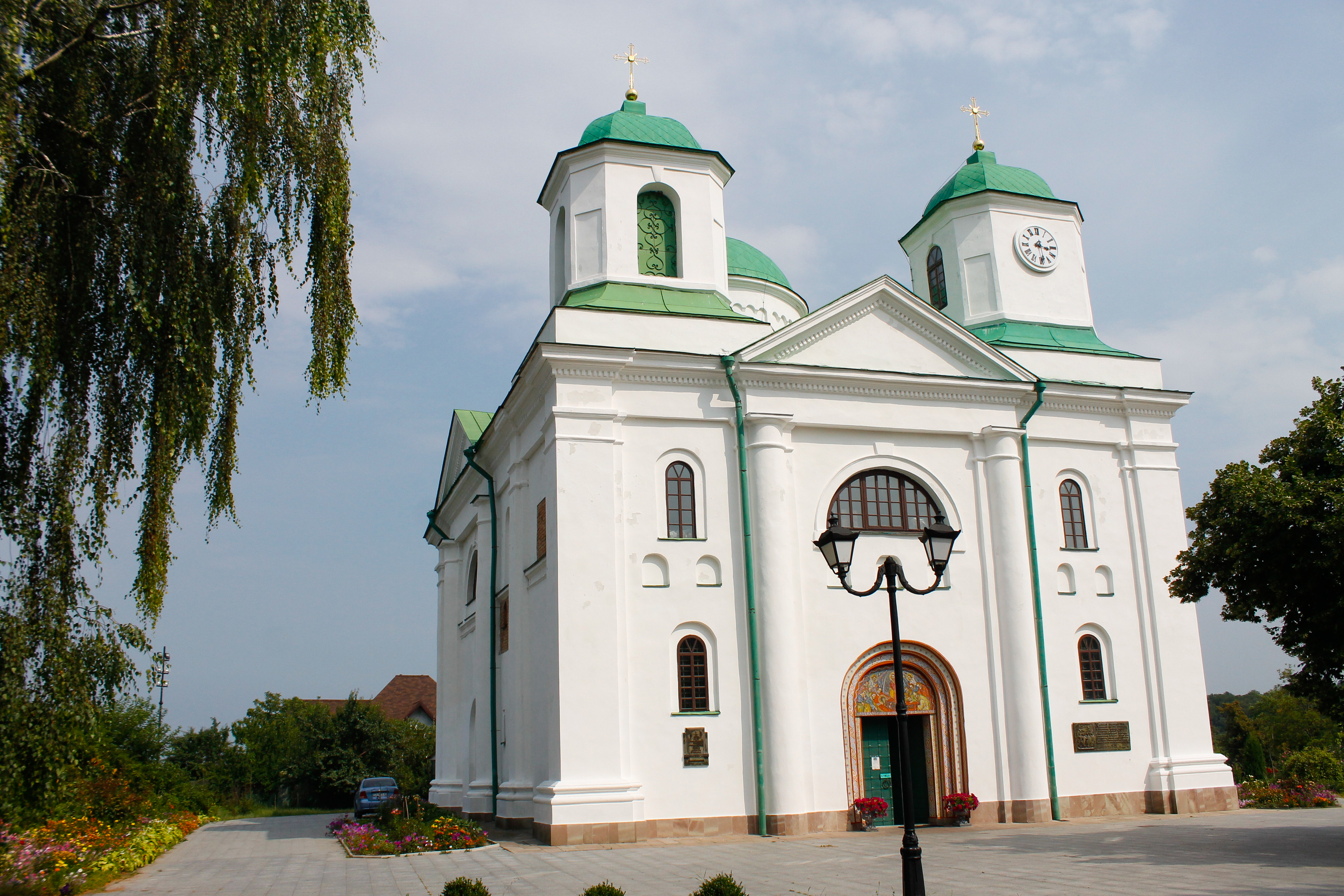
Front view

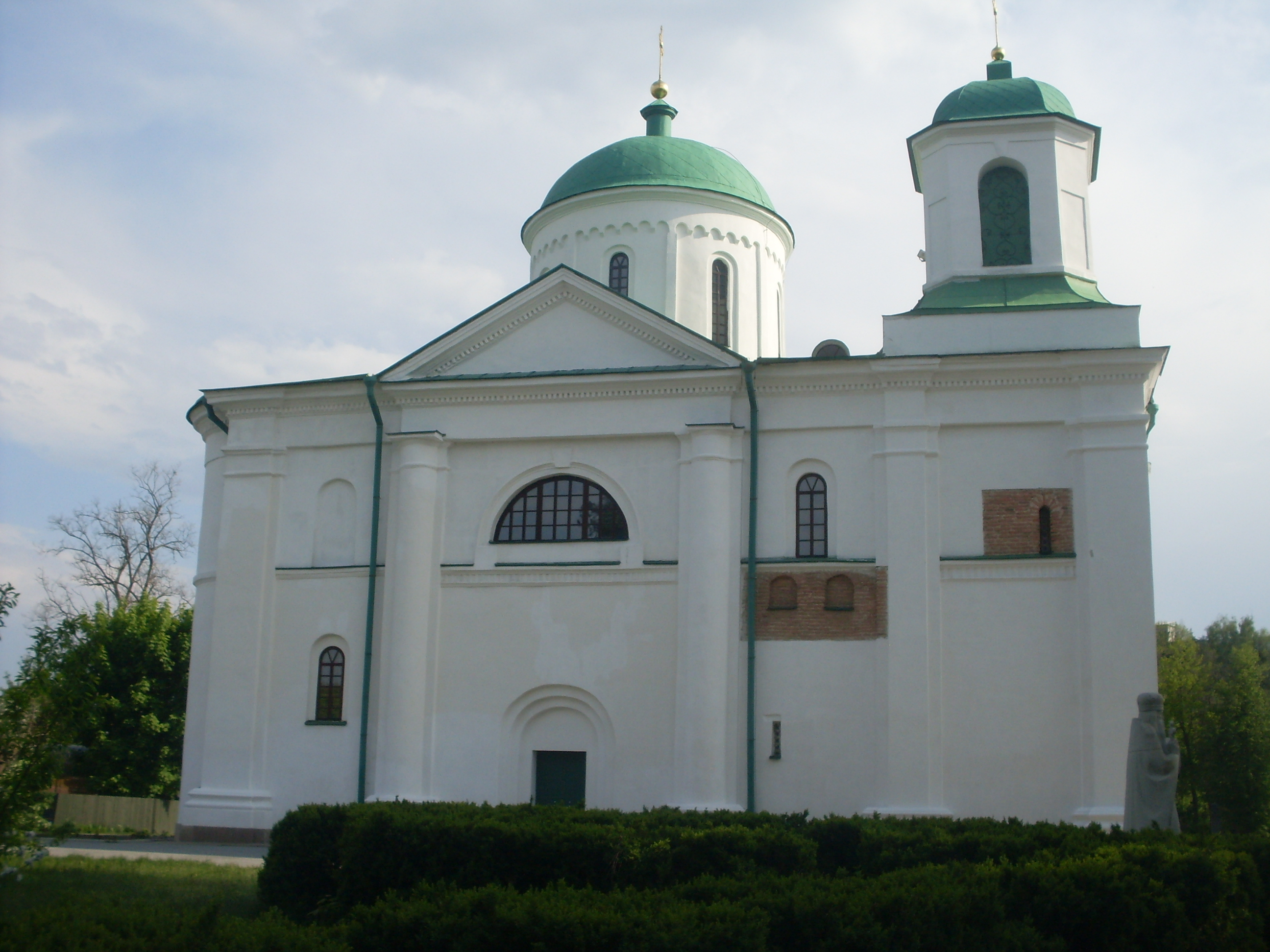
Side view. Note the two exposed parts of the original wall.

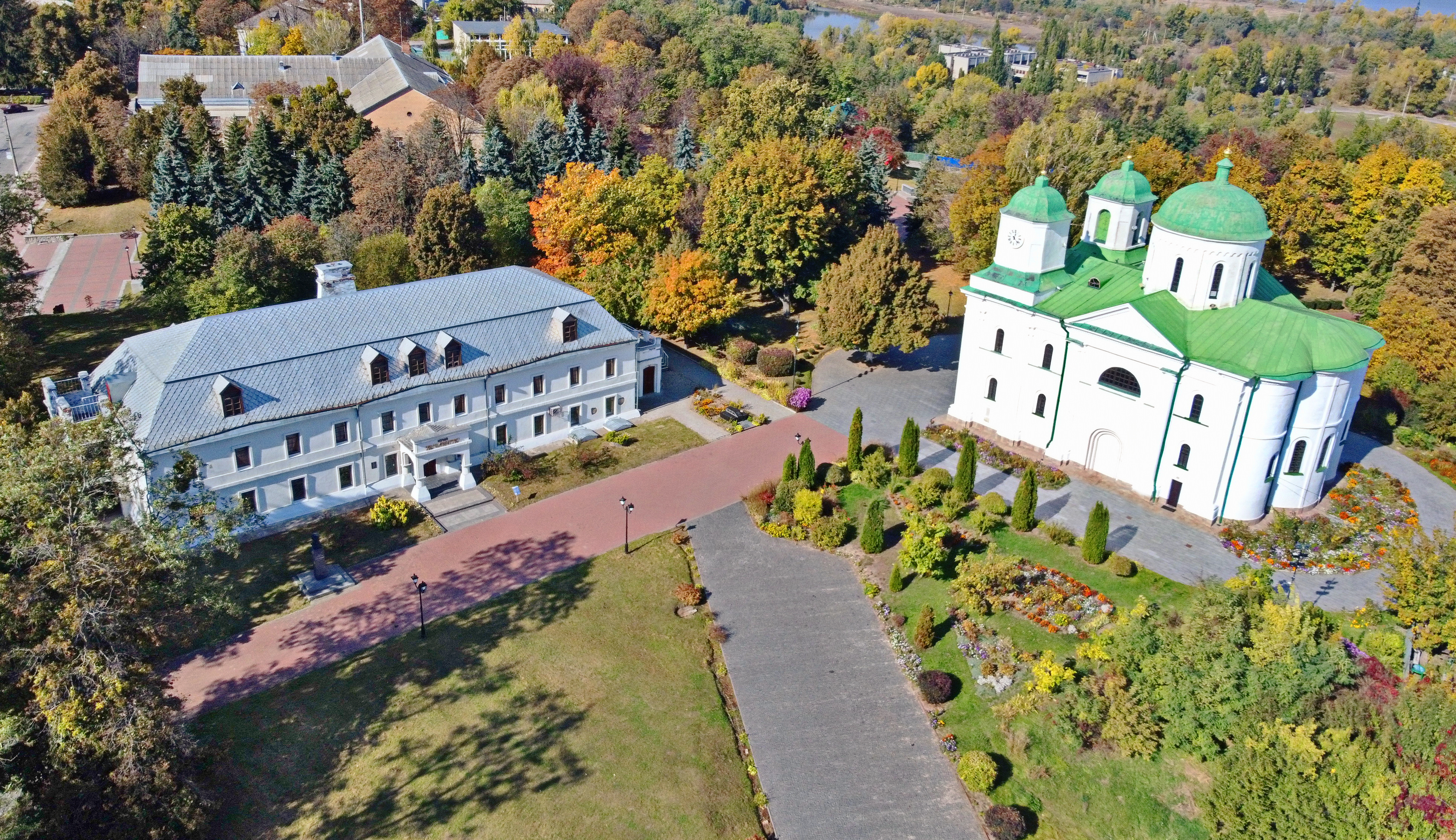
The cathedral complex from above

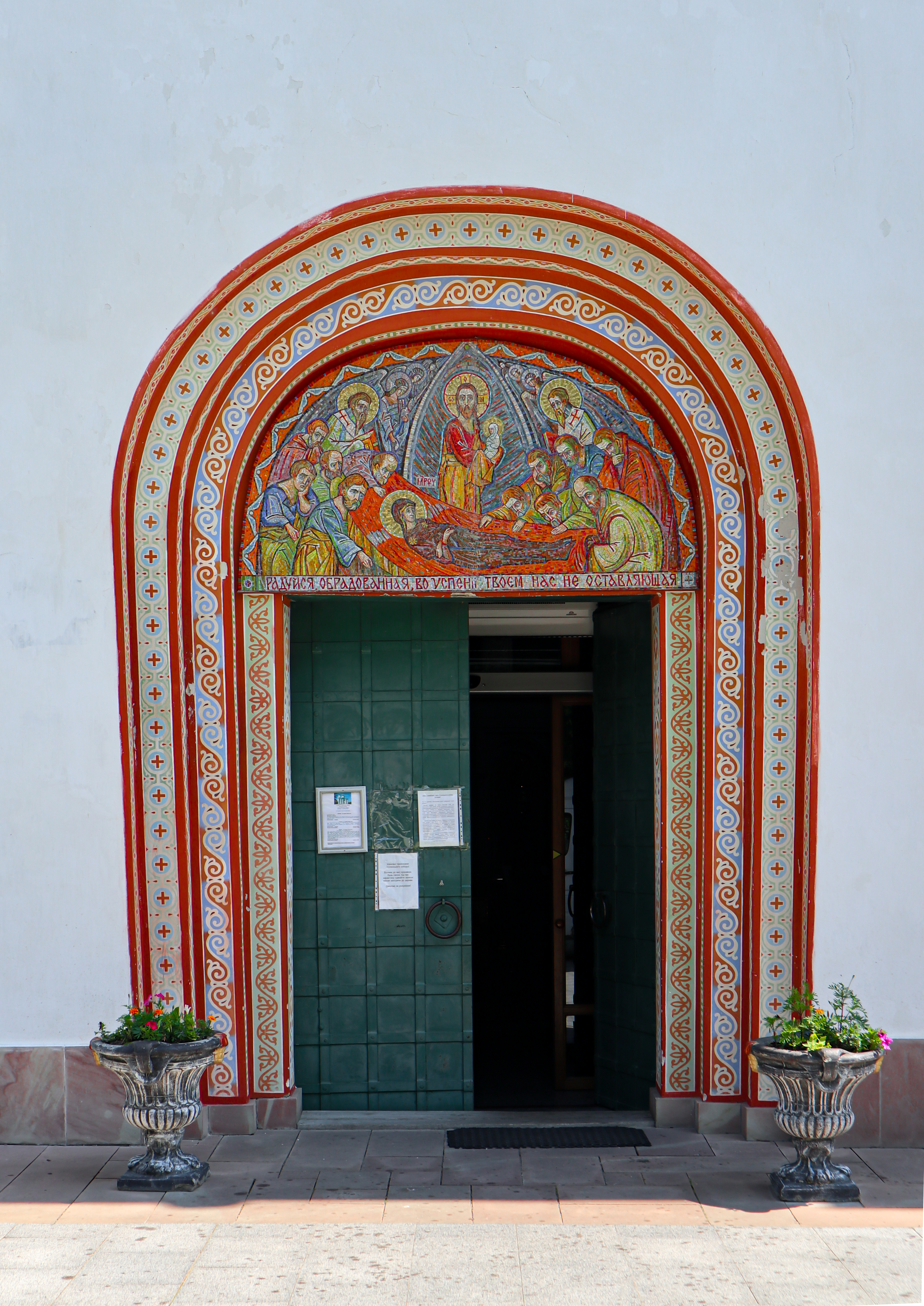
Front door

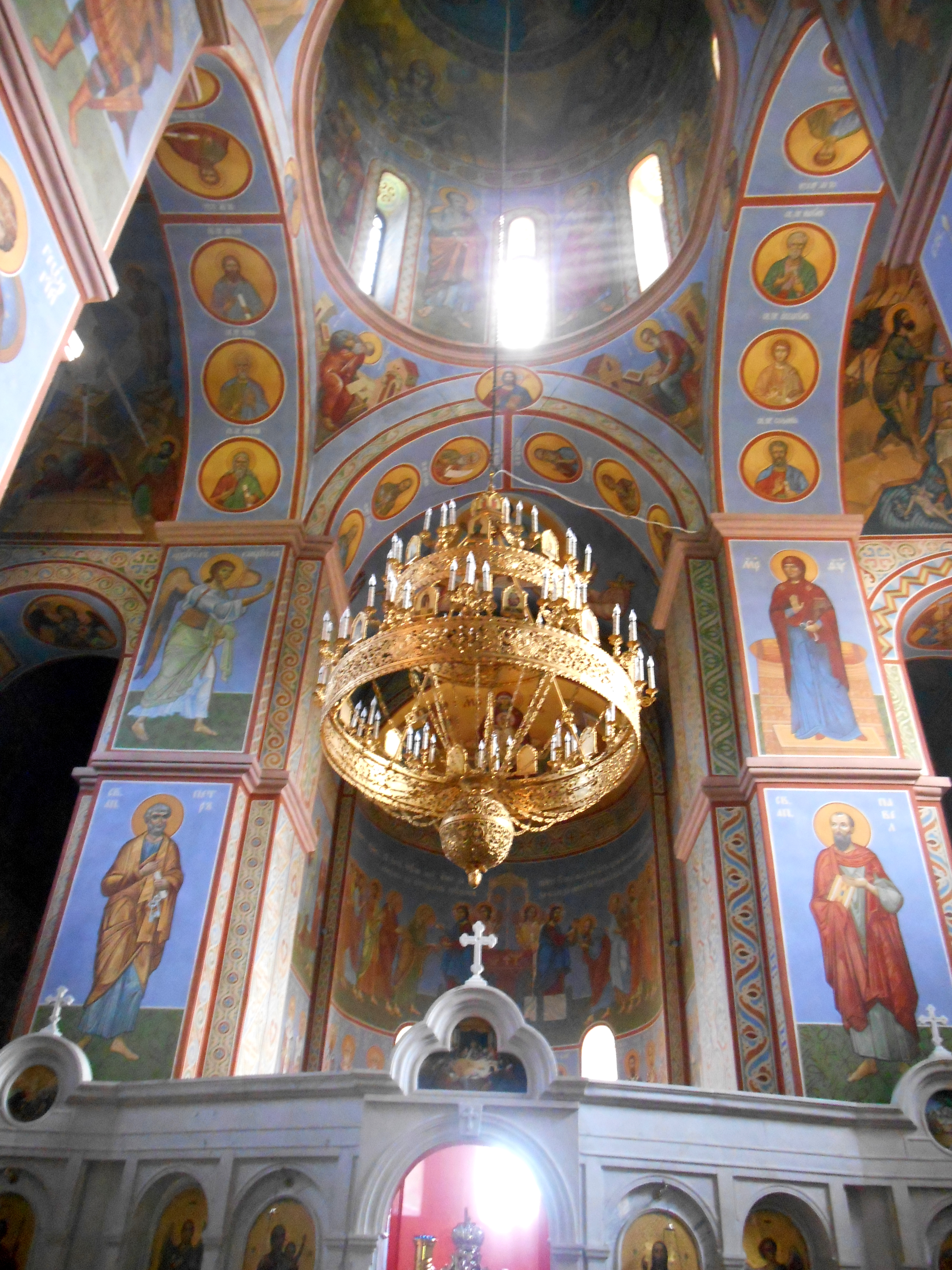
Interior
