= Shevchenko National Reserve =

Ukrainian historic reserve

Coordinates: 49°43′53″N 31°30′56″E

The Shevchenko National Reserve (Ukrainian: Шевченківський національний заповідник, romanized: Shevchenkivskyi natsionalnyi zapovidnyk) is a historic-cultural reserve near Kaniv (Ukraine), known for the grave of Ukrainian poet Taras Shevchenko and a museum dedicated to his memory. The total area of the reserve is 45 hectares, the reserve includes eight cultural heritage sites, and borders the Kaniv Nature Reserve.

== Background ==
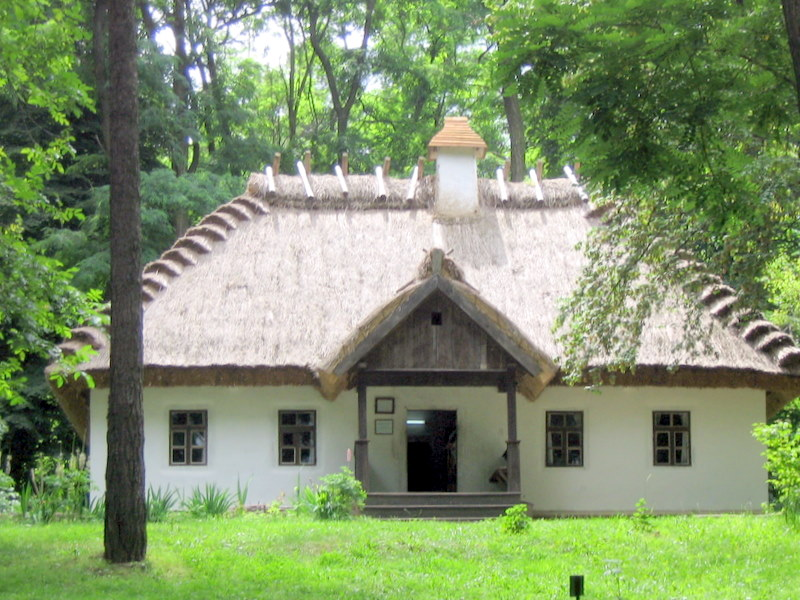
"Taras' room", an 1884 built museum renovated in 1991

On May 22, 1861, famous Ukrainian poet Taras Shevchenko was buried on a Chernecha Hill, which afterwards became known as Taras Hill (Ukrainian: Тарасова гора, romanized: Tarasova Hora). In 1884, the first folk museum of Taras Shevchenko was built on Taras Hill and a monumental cast-iron cross-monument designed to Viktor Sychuhov was erected. On June 10, 1918, the Council of Ministers of the Ukrainian State recognized the tomb of Taras Shevchenko as national property. In August 1925 Tarasova Hill was recognized as a reserve.

During 1935–1937, the Taras Shevchenko Museum was built. In 1939, a new, bronze monument to the poet designed by Matvei Manizer was erected. Destroyed during the Second World War by the German army, the museum and the monument were rebuilt. In 1989, the reserve was inscribed in the tentative World Heritage list of Ukraine. In the same year, the reserve was granted national status and assumed its present name. This was confirmed by the Decree of the President of Ukraine in 1994.

== Nowadays ==
The reserve is included in the sphere of management of the Ministry of Culture and Tourism of Ukraine. The department is managed by the State Service for National Cultural Heritage.

The reserve is a cultural-educational, research and tourist center that studies and promotes the heritage of the Ukrainian national and world historical and cultural heritage, the work by Taras Shevchenko, the history of Chernecha Hill, as well as protects cultural monuments from prehistoric times to the present, as well as the natural landscape. Its collection includes works by textile artist Hanna Veres.

Every year the museums of the Shevchenko National Reserve are visited by more than 100 thousand tourists from Ukraine and abroad.

General directors of Shevchenko National Reserve:

- 1989–2005 – Ihor Likhovy
- 2005–2010 – Maryan Pinyak
- 2010–2011 – Ihor Renkas
- 2011–2013 – Vasyl Kolomiets
- 2014–2015 – Vasyl Tulin
- 2015–2020 – Maryan Pinyak
- Since 2020 – Valentyna Kovalenko

== Gallery ==
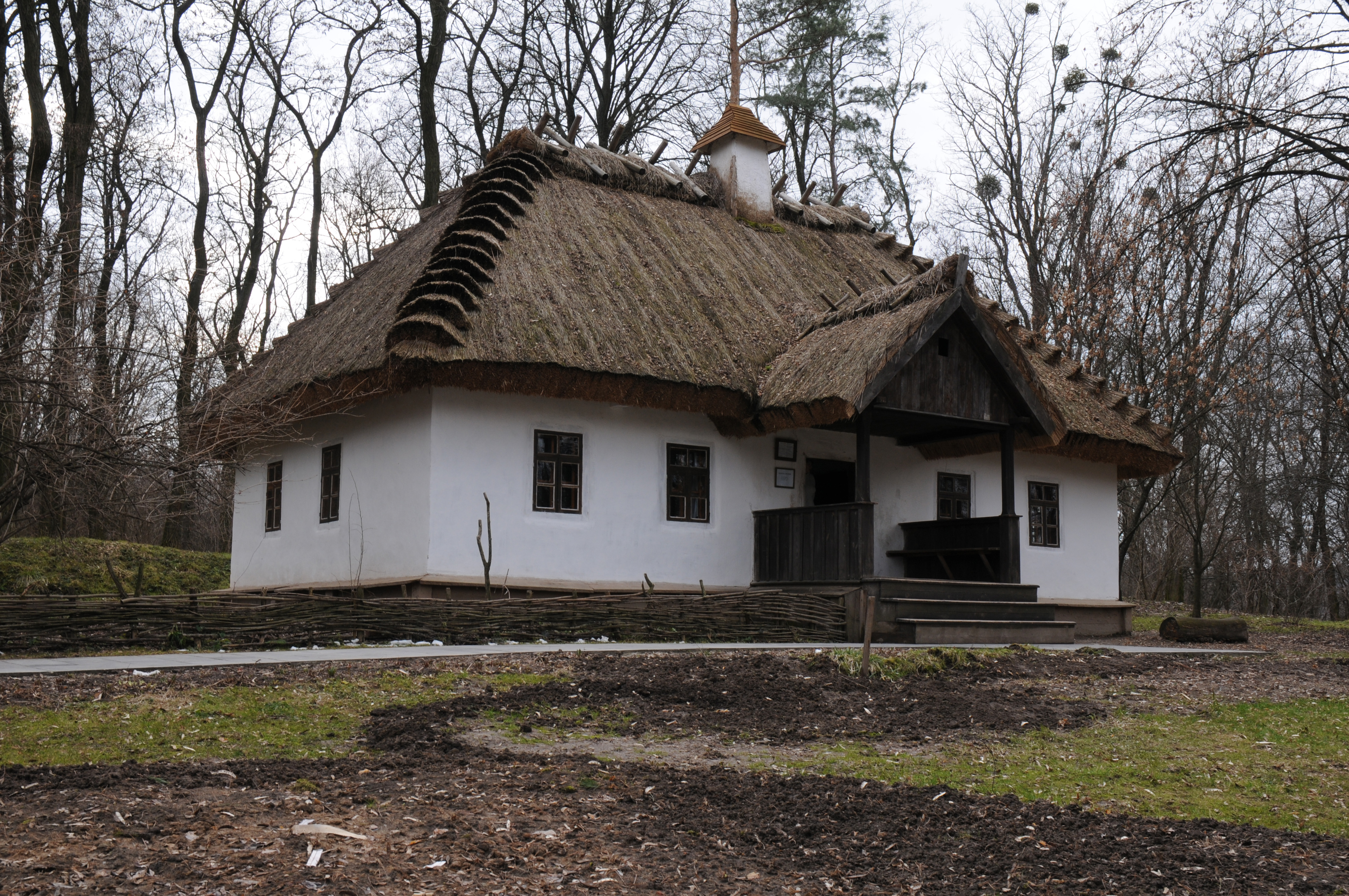
Taras Shevchenko's chamber

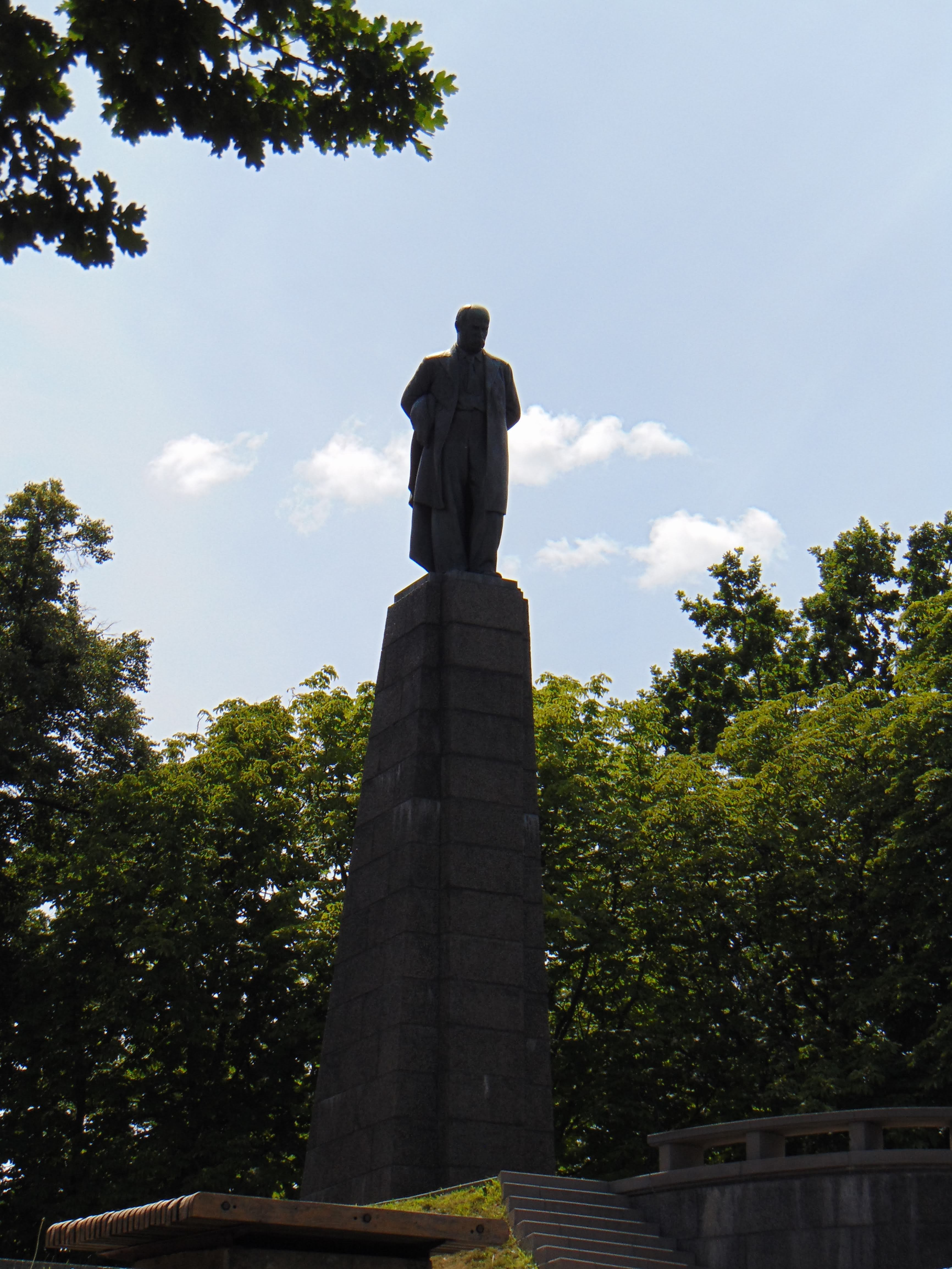
Monument to Taras Shevchenko

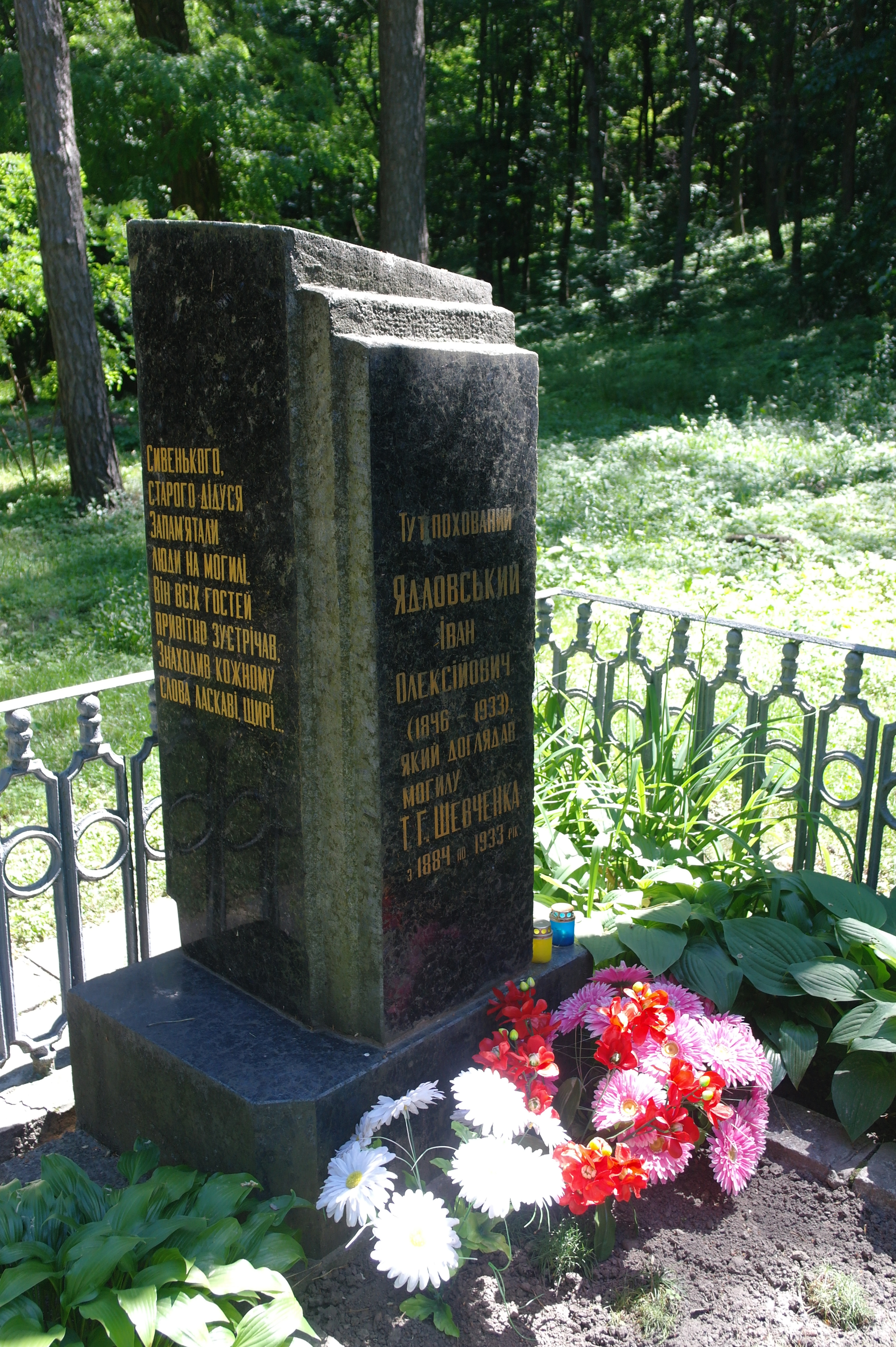
The grave of Ivan Yadlovsky, the first caretaker of Taras Shevchenko's burial
