= Kaniv Nature Reserve =

Strict nature reserve in Ukraine

- Ukrainian: Канівський природний заповідник
- IUCN category Ia (strict nature reserve)
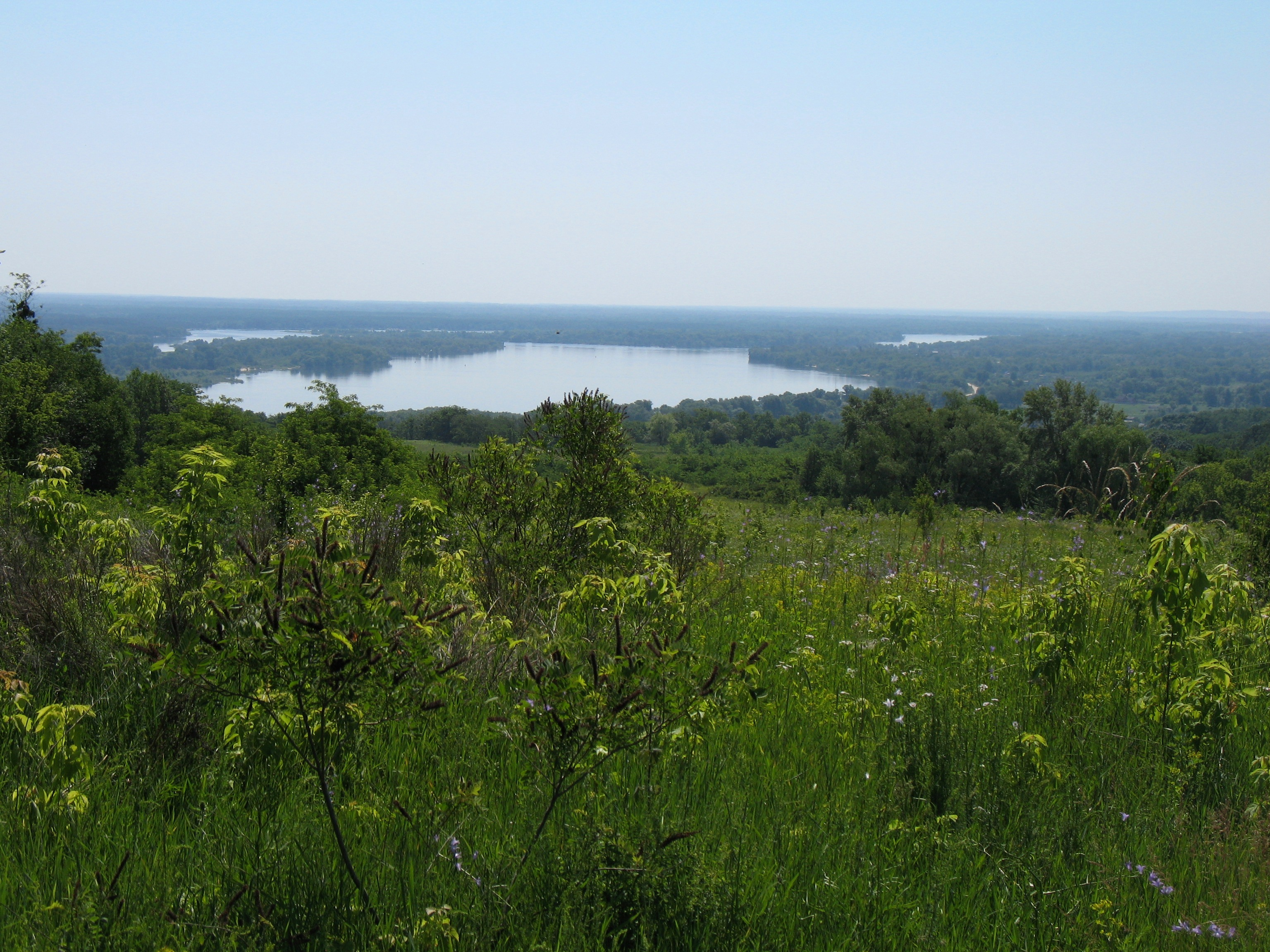
- Kaniv Nature Reserve

- Location within Ukraine
- Location: Cherkasy Oblast
- Nearest city: Kaniv
- Coordinates: 49°44′40″N 31°27′21″E
- Area: 2,027 hectares (5,009 acres; 20 km^{2}; 8 sq mi)
- Established: 1923
- Governing body: Taras Shevchenko National University of Kyiv
- Website: http://kanivbiosfera.at.ua/

The Kaniv Nature Reserve (Ukrainian: Канівський природний заповідник) is a protected nature reserve of Ukraine that covers a portion of the right bank of the Dnieper River, and two floodplain islands in the river itself. The reserve is in the center of Ukraine, along the northeast edge of the Dnieper Upland. It was created to protect valuable forest-steppe and floodplain habitat. The site is known for an abundance of archaeological sites left by cultures back to the Paleolithic. The reserve is a unit of the Taras Shevchenko National University of Kyiv, and is located in Cherkasy Oblast.

== Topography ==
The hills on the right bank (west side) of the Dnieper are forested and represent the majority of the reserve. The largest floodplain islands are the Serpentine Islands (116 ha) in the Kaniv Reservoir, Shelest Island (394 ha) in the Dnieper, and Kruglik Island in the Dnieper. There is a protective zone of 1,353 hectares around the reserve's borders. The reserve was originally founded in 1923 as the National Forest Steppe Reserve, and went through several changes in control before assuming its present form in 1986.

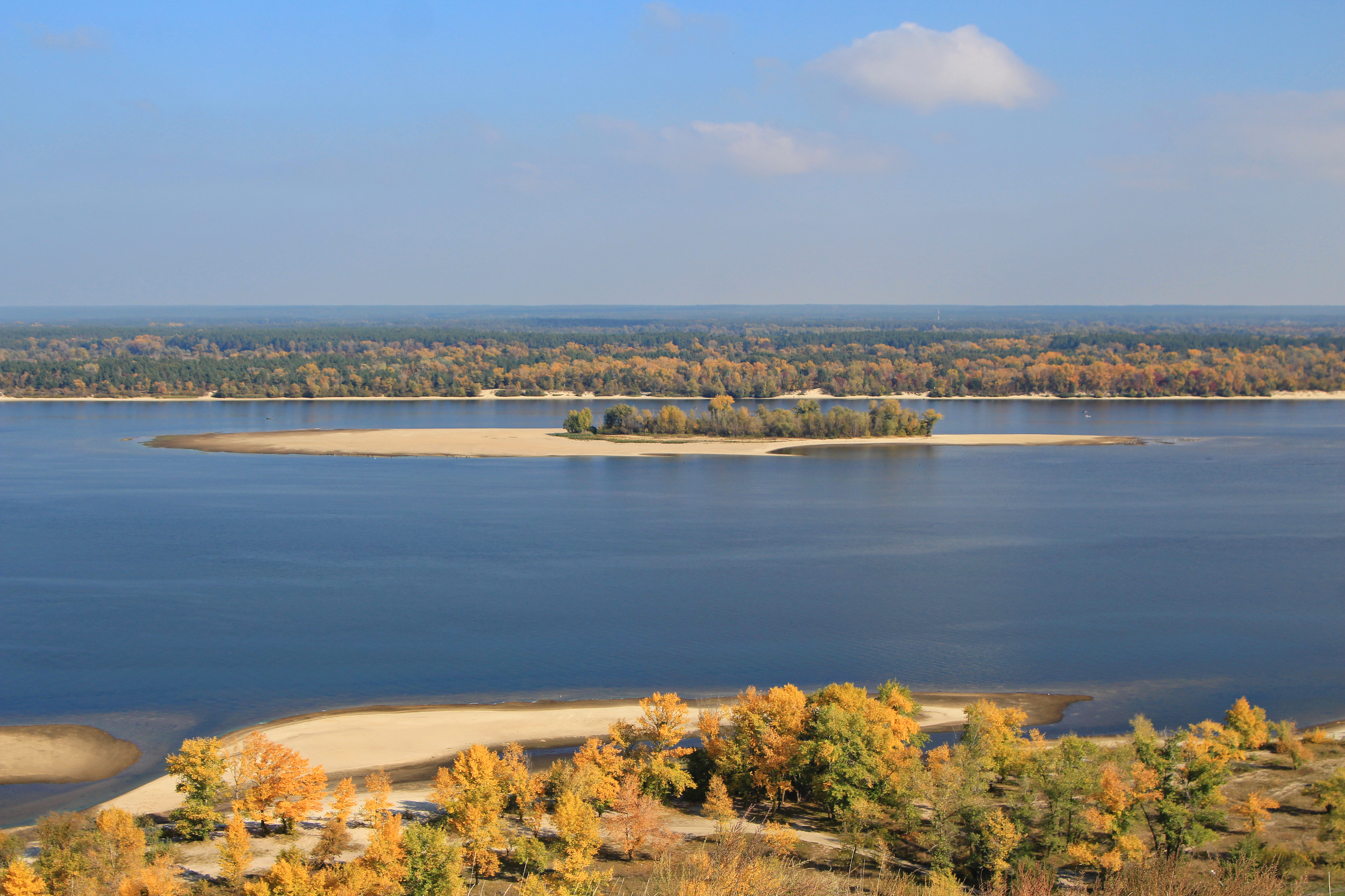
Floodplain islands in the reserve

== Climate and ecoregion ==
The climate of Kaniv is Humid continental climate, warm summer (Köppen climate classification (Dfb)). This climate is characterized by large seasonal temperature differentials and a warm summer (at least four months averaging over 10 °C (50 °F), but no month averaging over 22 °C (72 °F).

The Kaniv reserve straddles the transition zone between the Central European mixed forests and East European forest steppe ecoregions.

== Flora and fauna ==
85% of the reserve is forested, with elm and oak the most common trees. The animals are those typical of the forest steppe, including roe deer, badgers, and marten. 233 species of birds have been recorded on the site.

== Public use ==
As a strict nature reserve, Kaniv's primary purpose is protection of nature and scientific study. Public access is possible at certain points of cultural interest, notably Taras Hill, the site of a monument to Ukrainian poet Taras Shevchenko. The reserve also hosts a Museum of Nature that is open to the public, containing 2,000 exhibits related to the paleontology, archaeology, forestry, botany, zoology, and history of the Kaniv Reserve. Two rooms in the museum house a tribute to the Ukrainian scientist Mykola Biliashivsky. Reserve staff provide guided tours for the public on three ecological tour routes through the reserve; these routes are only open in the warm months. Limited lodging is also available on site.

== See also ==
- Kaniv Hills
- Lists of Nature Preserves of Ukraine (class Ia protected areas)
- National Parks of Ukraine (class II protected areas)
