= Kaniv =

City in Cherkasy Oblast, Ukraine

Kaniv Канів
- City
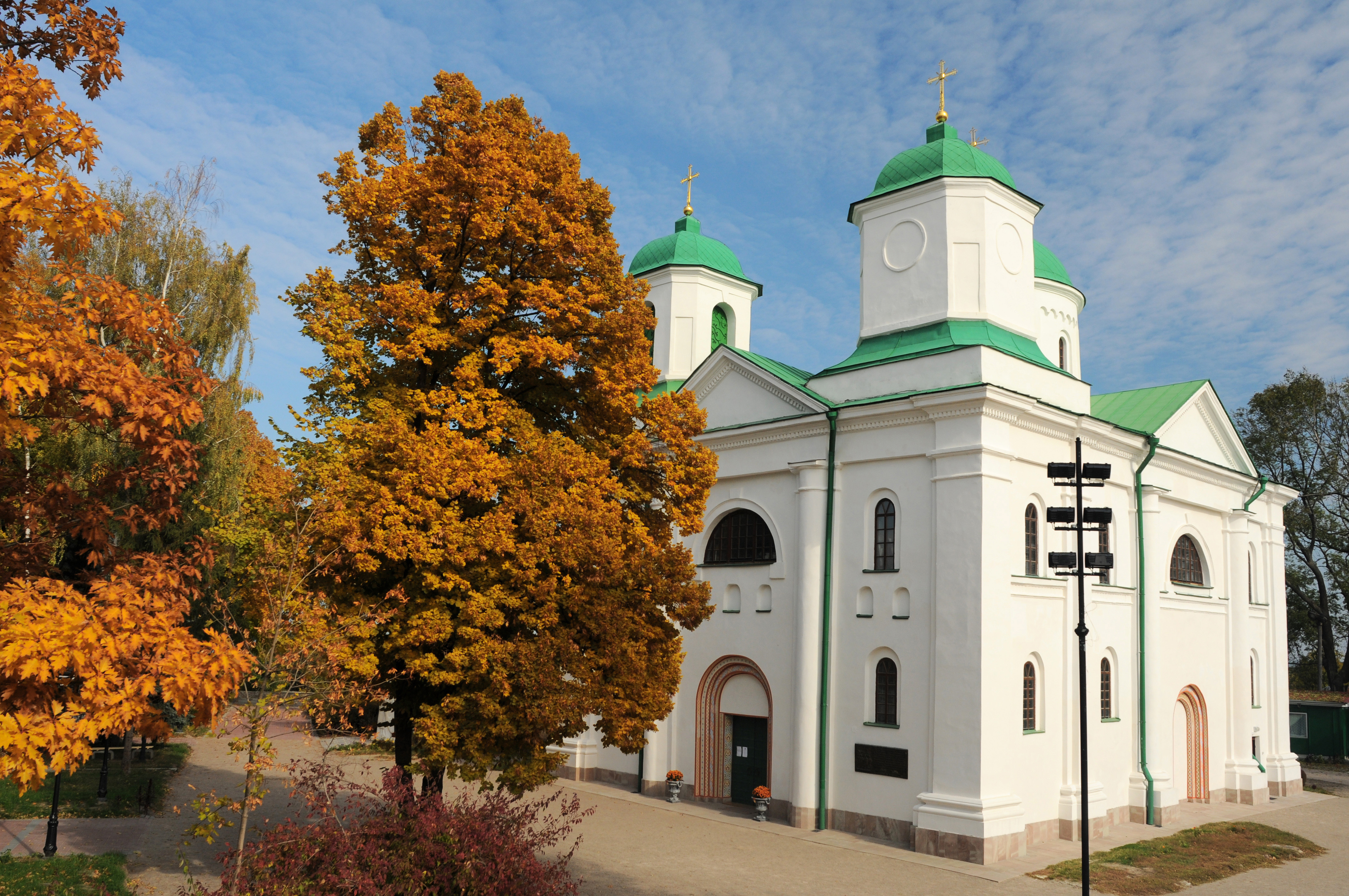
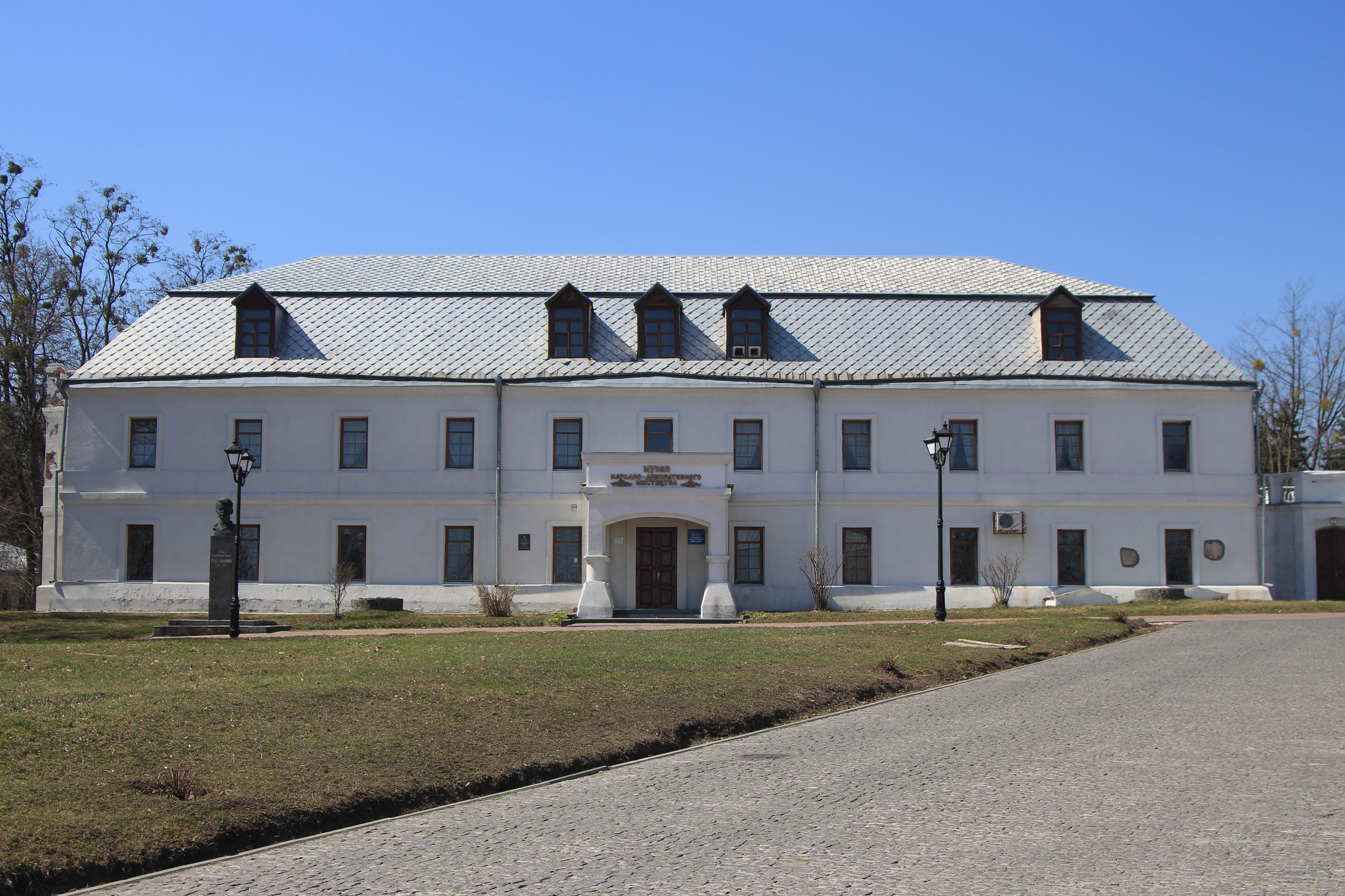
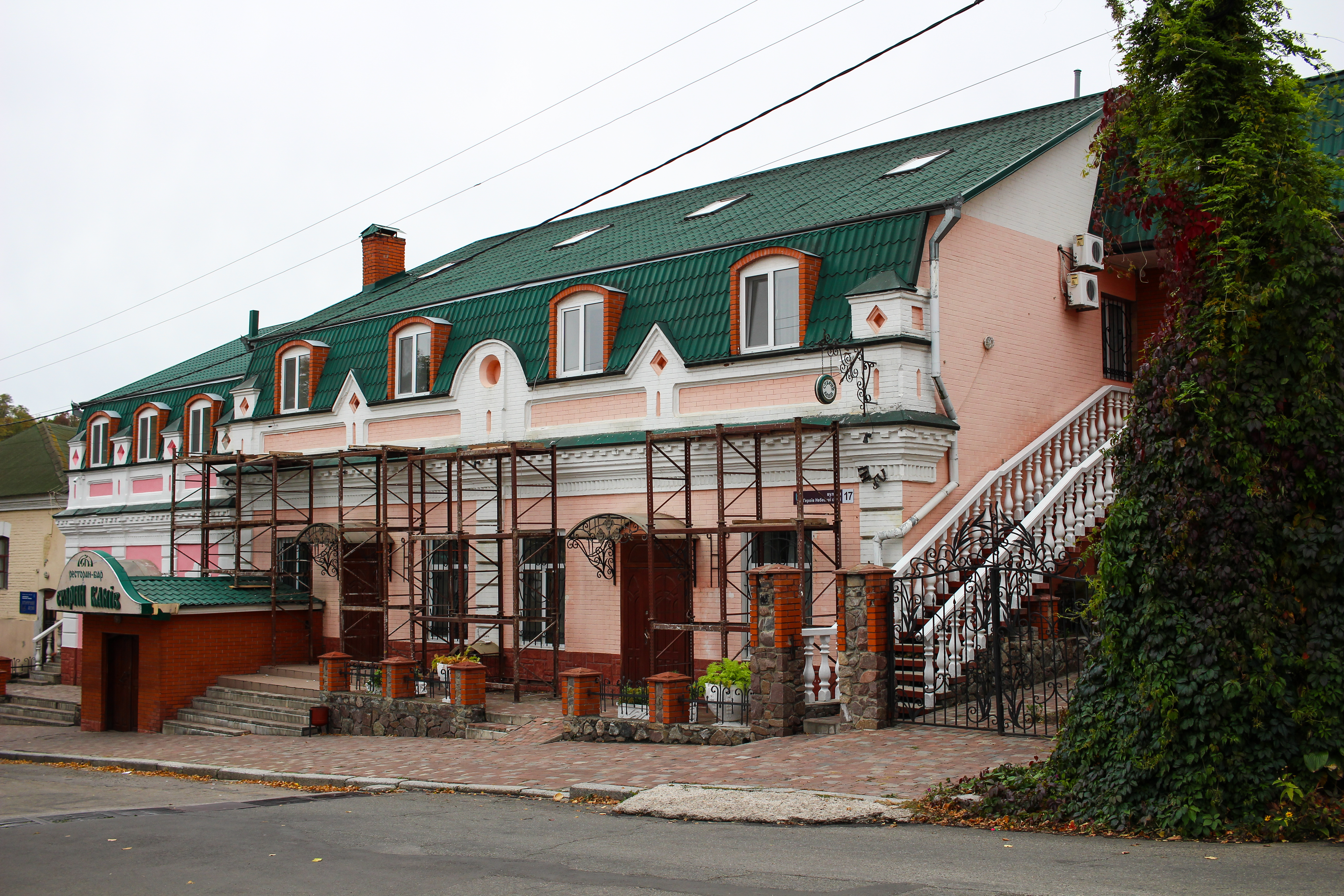
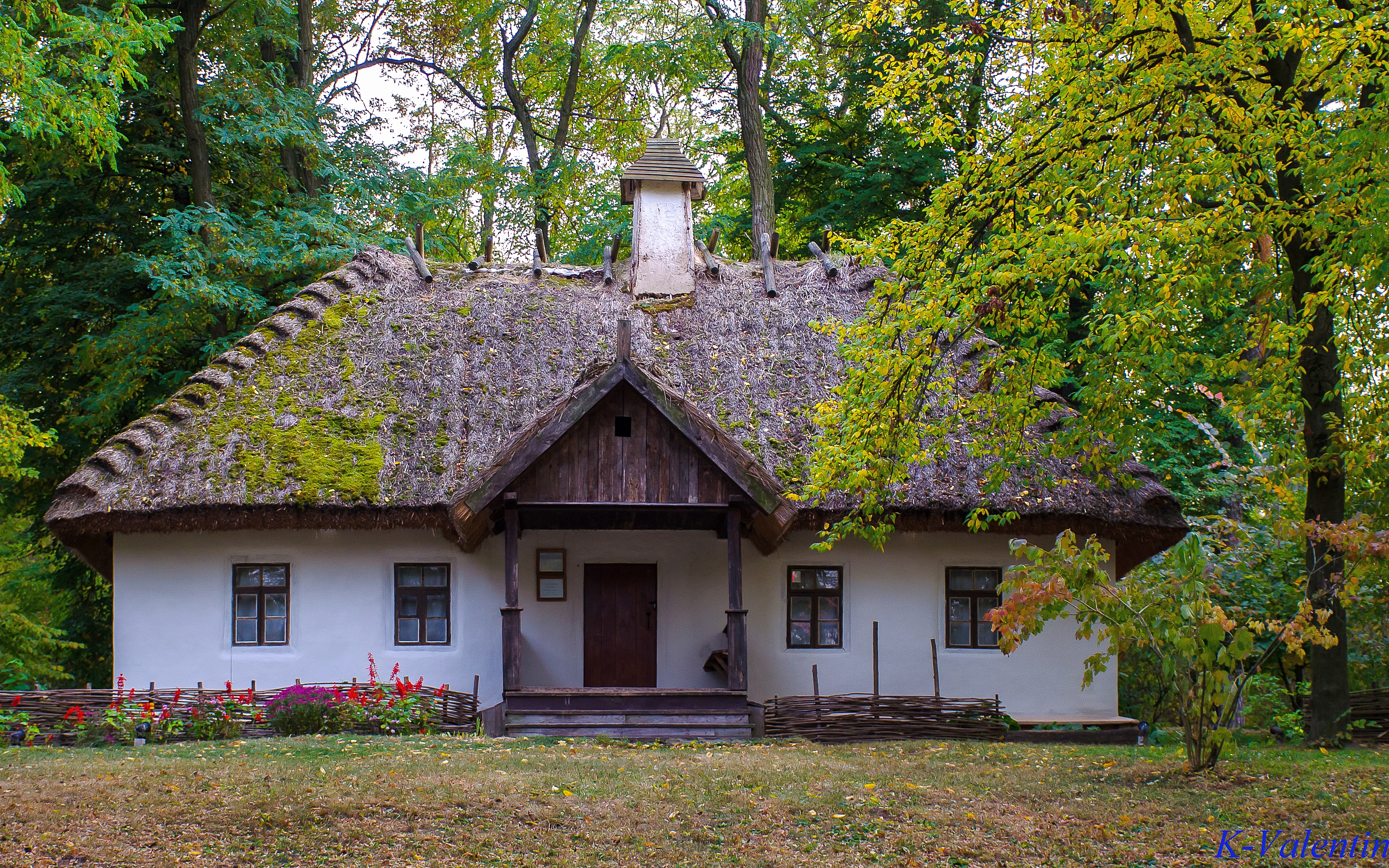
- Saint George's Cathedral Basilian School Shops of Krokovych Taras Shevchenko's Chamber

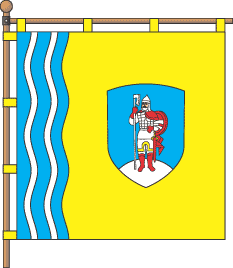
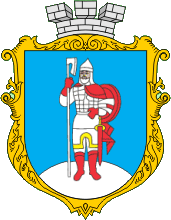
- Flag Coat of arms

- Location of Kaniv Kaniv (Ukraine)
- Coordinates: 49°45′N 31°28′E
- Country: Ukraine
- Oblast: Cherkasy Oblast
- Raion: Cherkasy Raion
- Hromada: Kaniv urban hromada
- First mentioned: 1078
- City rights: 1796

Government
  - Mayor: Ihor Ren'kas

Area
  - Total: 17.42 km^{2} (6.73 sq mi)
- Elevation: 101 m (331 ft)

Population (2022)
  - Total: 23,172
  - Density: 1,330/km^{2} (3,445/sq mi)
- Postal code: 19000—19009
- Area code: +380 4736
- Sister cities: Viersen, Sonoma, Lambersart, Człuchów
- Website: Official government website, City website

Kaniv (Ukrainian: Канів, IPA: [ˈkɑn⁽ʲ⁾iu̯]) is a city in Cherkasy Raion, Cherkasy Oblast, central Ukraine. The city rests on the Dnieper River, and is one of the main inland river ports on the Dnieper. It is an urban hromada of Ukraine. Population: 23,172 (2022 estimate).

Located on the right bank of the Dnieper, Kaniv is a historical city that was founded in the 11th century. As one of the largest cities of Kievan Rus', it was an outpost providing defence from Cuman raids. Later, in the 18th century, it became a popular destination for elderly Cossacks. Today Kaniv is best known as the burial site of Ukrainian poet and painter Taras Shevchenko, who is considered a founder of modern Ukrainian literature. The nearby Kaniv reserve is one of the oldest historical and cultural reserves in Ukraine.

== History ==
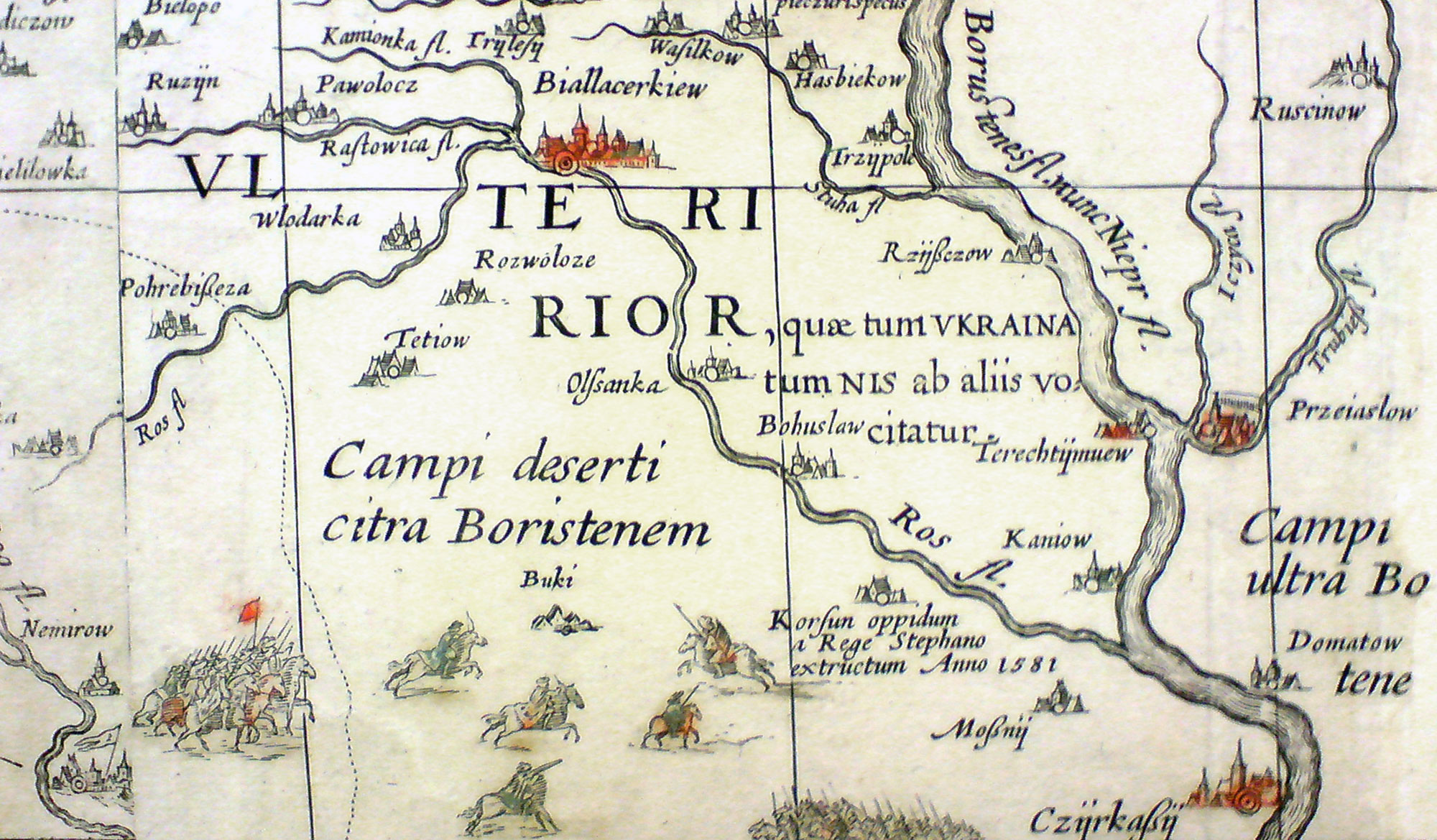
Kaniv (Kaniów) on the Radziwiłł map (1613)

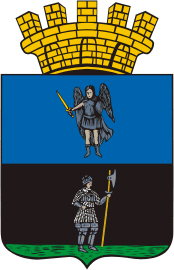
Coat of arms of Kanіv under the Russian Empire (1852).

The city's date of establishment is unknown. It was first mentioned in the Paterikon of Caves Monastery in Kyiv of the 11th century where it is mentioned about relocation of icon painters from Constantinople during rule of Vsevolod of Kyiv. The first mention of Kaniv in chronicles is dated 9 June 1144 when the Grand Prince of Kyiv Vsevolod II founded the St. George's Cathedral (later known as the Dormition Cathedral). In chronicles it is also mentioned that in 1149 the Grand Prince of Kyiv George the Long-Armed after conquering Kyiv appointed his son Gleb as a prince in Kaniv. The city was also mentioned later in chronicles often in relation to raids onto Cumans. Among the killed Ruthenian princes at the 1223 battle at Kalka River, there was mentioned Prince Svyatoslav of Kaniv.

Archaeological excavations indicated that earlier Slavic settlement already existed near Kaniv before the 10th century. Also, some documents indicate the existence of the Holy Dormition Kaniv monastery in the 11th century.

There is no definite information on the source and meaning of the city's name; supposedly its name is derived from the personal nickname Kanya ('buzzard'). Mykola Yanko in his Toponymic dictionary of Ukraine says that the name is derived from Turkish word meaning the place of khan.

Founded near the older settlement of Roden (Rodnia), Kaniv soon overtook it as an important point of trade on the route from Kyiv to Constantinople. From mid-12th century Kaniv became a big city and played prominent role in the Kievan Rus' (Ruthenian state) where it was a center of an apanage principality within the principality of Kyiv. Until the 13th century, the central part of Kaniv was so called "Hellenic town" located at the Moskovka Mountain. During its heyday Kaniv served as the residence of princes Mstislav Mstislavich and Roman the Great and was an important defensive fortification during raids by Polovtsians.

According to popular historical sources, in 1239 the city was conquered and razed by the Mongols. Kaniv was mentioned in the 1245 report of Giovanni da Pian del Carpine as a Tatar post. In 1362 it was annexed by the Grand Duchy of Lithuania. In the 14th century, Grand Duke of Lithuania Vytautas the Great built in Kaniv a castle that existed until 1768. Under Lithuanian rule Kaniv served as the residence of a starost.

In 1431, Kaniv became part of the Lithuanian Kyiv Voivodeship. It was sacked by the Ottoman Turks in 1458. In 1569, Kaniv came under the rule of Poland, and became one of the centers of Cossack culture and military life. In 1600, it received the Magdeburg Rights, but the city's prosperity was halted by successive plagues, fires, and Cossack unrest. Kaniv (known in Polish as Kaniów) was a royal city of the Lesser Poland Province of the Polish Crown. During The Deluge the town was captured by the forces of Bohdan Khmelnytsky in 1648.

In 1648-78, the city was the center of the Kaniv Regiment, Cossack formation of which was established long before the Khmelnytsky Uprising as part of registered Cossack formations in Polish service. In 1662, the Right-Bank forces of Yuri Khmelnytsky, supported by Polish and Crimean Tatar troops, were defeated in a battle by the Russian forces of Grigory Romodanovsky and the Left-Bank Cossacks of Yakym Somko. In 1678, the Kaniv regiment was overran by Turks and its administration was transferred to Bohuslav. In 1768, it was captured by one of the leaders of the Koliyivschyna, Maksym Zalizniak. As an effect of a pogrom, most of the local szlachta and Jews were killed.

In 1775 Kaniv became a personal property of the King of Poland Stanisław August Poniatowski who, in 1777, gave it away to his nephew S. Poniatowski. In 1787, Kaniv was visited by Catherine II, who met there with the Polish king. Following the Second Partition of Poland in 1793 the town with large parts of other territories came under the control of the Russian Empire. In 1800, Poniatowski sold the bigger portion of the city to archimandrite of the Kaniv Monastery of Saint Basil the Great B. Fizikiewicz, who in his turn bequeathed his property to the local school of the Order of Saint Basil the Great.

Under the Russian rule Kaniv served as a minor district centre. In 1897 the city had 9,000 inhabitants.

During the later stages of the Great War, on 11 May 1918, the town was the scene of the Battle of Kaniów, in which the forces of the 2nd Polish Corps and the Polish Legions under Józef Haller de Hallenburg failed to break through the Austro-German lines to the Russian side. In 1920 a battle between forces of the Ukrainian People's Republic and the Bolsheviks took place there. During the Second World War, Kaniv was a site of an unsuccessful drop of Soviet paratroopers.

In 1978, Oleksa Hirnyk burned himself to death on a hill near Shevchenko's tomb in protest of Russification. In 2007, he was honored as a Hero of Ukraine.

Until 18 July 2020, Kaniv was designated as a city of oblast significance and did not belong to Kaniv Raion even though it was the center of the raion. As part of the administrative reform of Ukraine, which reduced the number of raions of Cherkasy Oblast to four, the city was merged into Cherkasy Raion.

== Population ==
=== Ethnic groups ===
Distribution of the population by ethnicities according to the 2001 census:

Ethnic groups in Kaniv
	percent
Ukrainians	89.14%
Russians	9.61%
Belarusians	0.50%
Armenians	0.12%
others	0.63%

=== Language ===
Distribution of the population by native language according to the 2001 census:

Language	Percentage
Ukrainian	88.43%
Russian	11.24%
other/undecided	0.33%

== Administrative status ==
Kaniv is the administrative center of the Kaniv Raion (district). However, the city is a city of oblast subordinance, thus being subject directly to the oblast authorities rather to the raion administration housed within the city itself.

== Economy ==
Industry in the city includes Kaniv hydroelectric power plant located on the Kaniv Reservoir on the Dnieper, fruit and vegetable, condiments factory, large milk and cheese factory, poultry processing.

== Landmarks and monuments ==
A major landmark of Kaniv is the Dormition Cathedral constructed in 1144 by prince Vsevolod Olgovich. Rebuilt in 1966–70, after 1972 the cathedral building was housing the newly established Kaniv folk art museum. After dissolution of the Soviet Union, the church was passed to the Eastern Orthodox community of Moscow Patriarchate, while the museum was relocated to another former religious building that used to belong to the Ukrainian Order of Saint Basil the Great.

=== Other points of interest ===
- Taras Hill — burial site of Ukrainian poet and artist Taras Shevchenko
- Grave and museum of Taras Shevchenko
- Monument to Oleg Koshevoy, a hero of the Soviet Union
- Museum of Arkady Gaidar
- Kaniv Hydroelectric Power Plant (HPS)
- Second World War Memorial Park;
- Monument to St. Makariy of Kaniv;
- Alley of Glory (Park Slavy).

== International relations ==
=== Twin towns — Sister cities ===
Kaniv is twinned with:

City	Country	Year of Signing
Viersen, North Rhine-Westphalia	Germany
Sonoma, California	United States
Lambersart, Nord-Pas-de-Calais	France
Człuchów	Poland

== See also ==
- List of cities in Ukraine

== Gallery ==
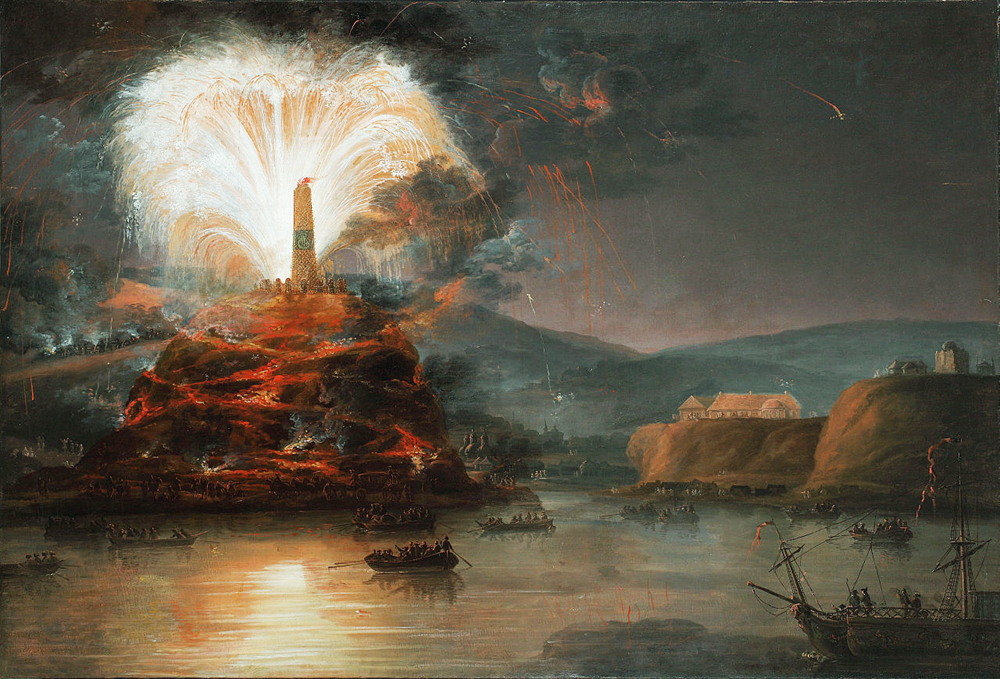
The "1787 fireworks in honor of Catherine II" by Jan Bogumi Plersz

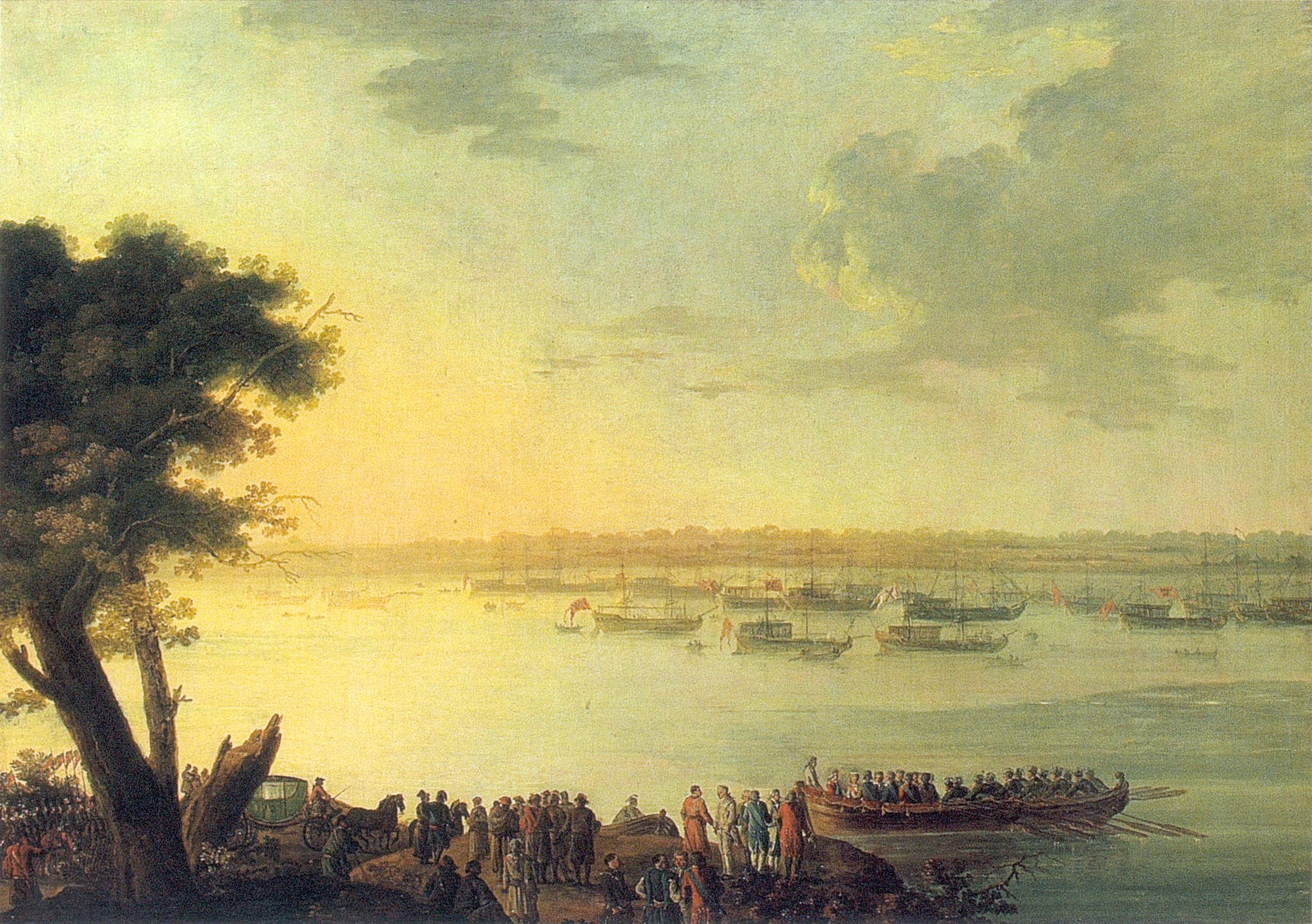
Catherine II leaving Kaniv in 1787, Jan Bogumił Plersch.

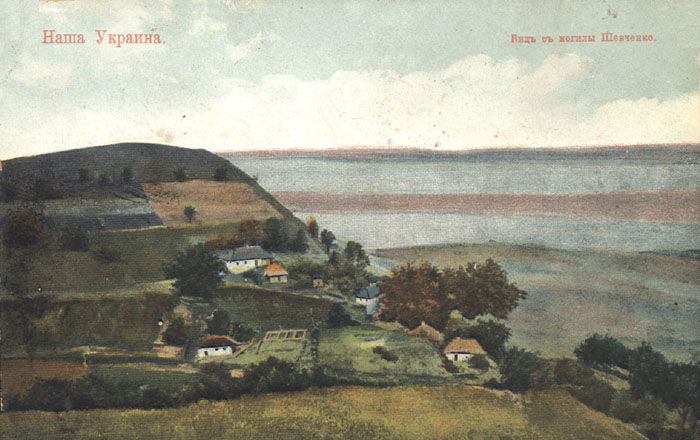
The 19th century postcard reads in Russian "Our Ukraine. View from the Shevchenko's grave"

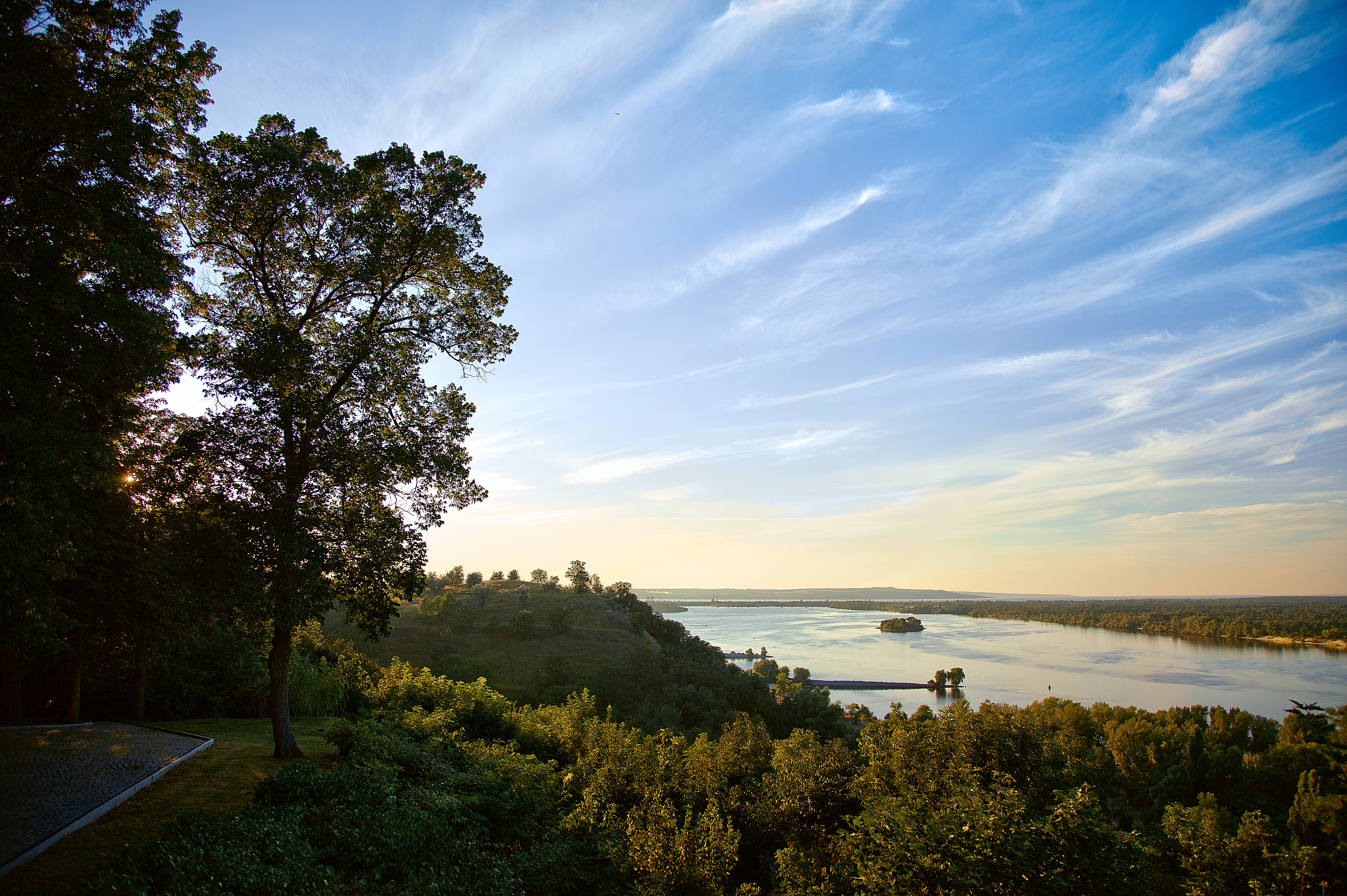
Dnieper River in Kaniv

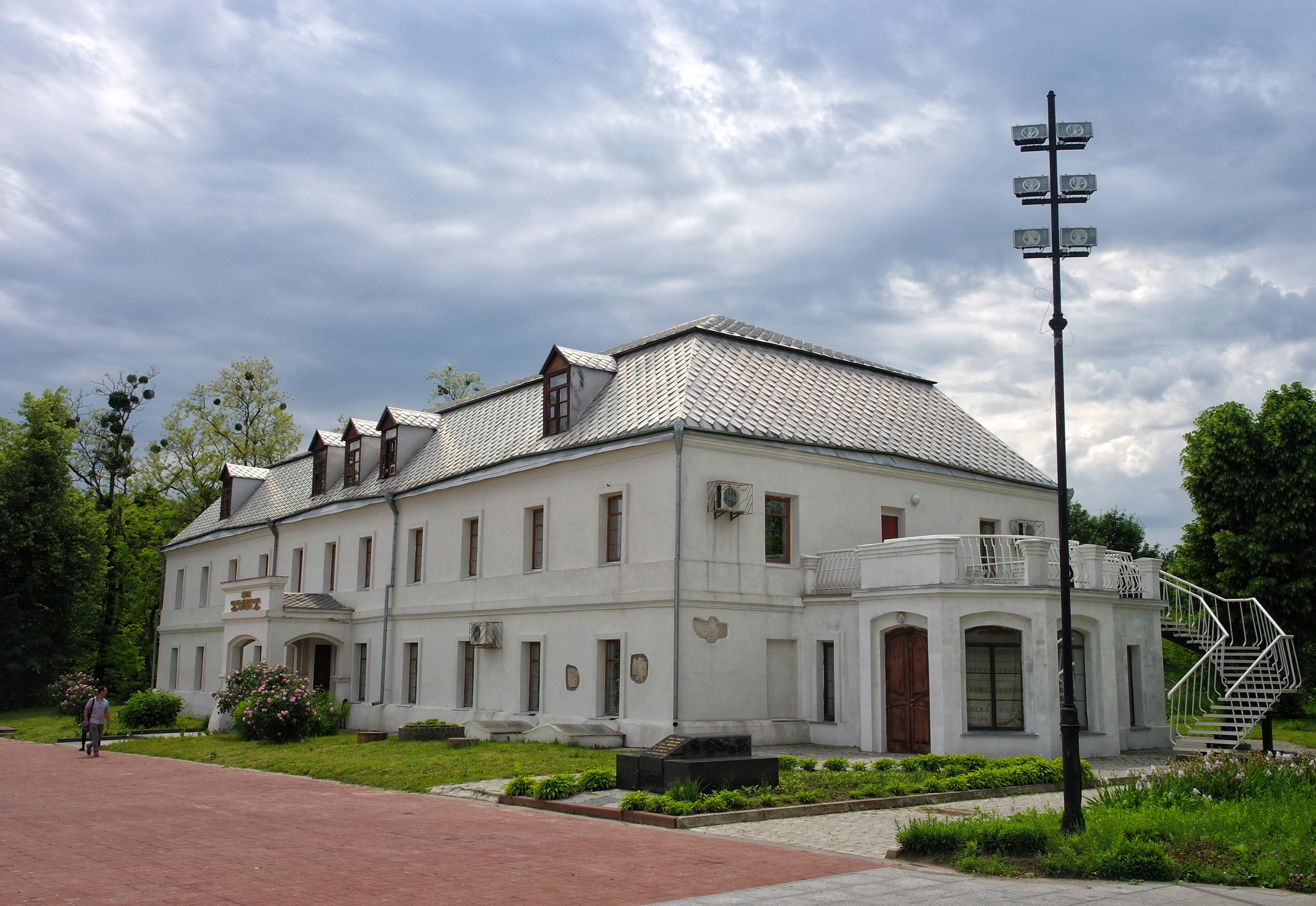
Kaniv folk art museum (formerly school of the Order of Saint Basil the Great)

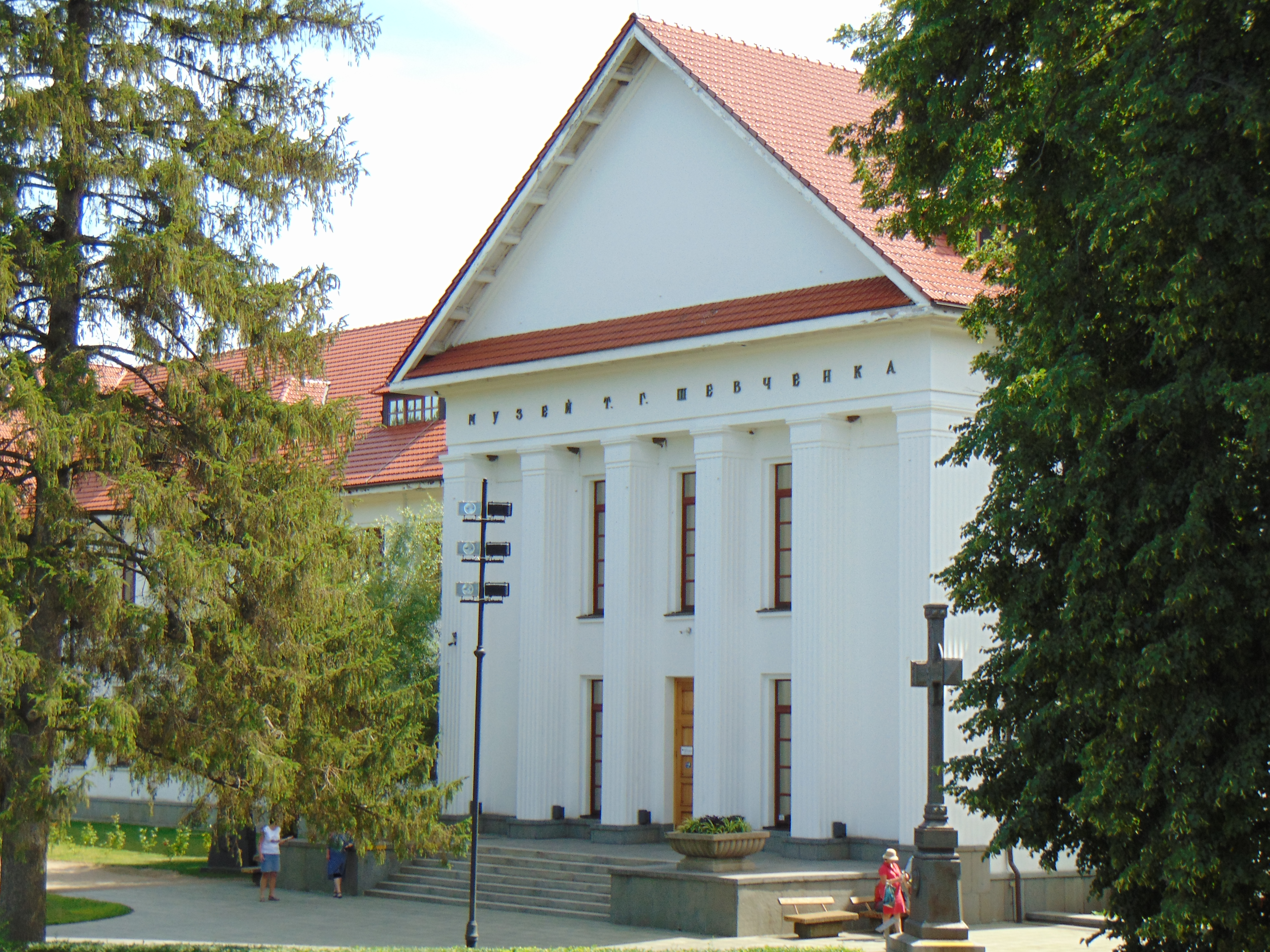
Taras Shevchenko museum
