= Dnieper Upland =

Landscape in Ukraine; part of the East European Plain

Coordinates: 49.1167°N 30.6167°E

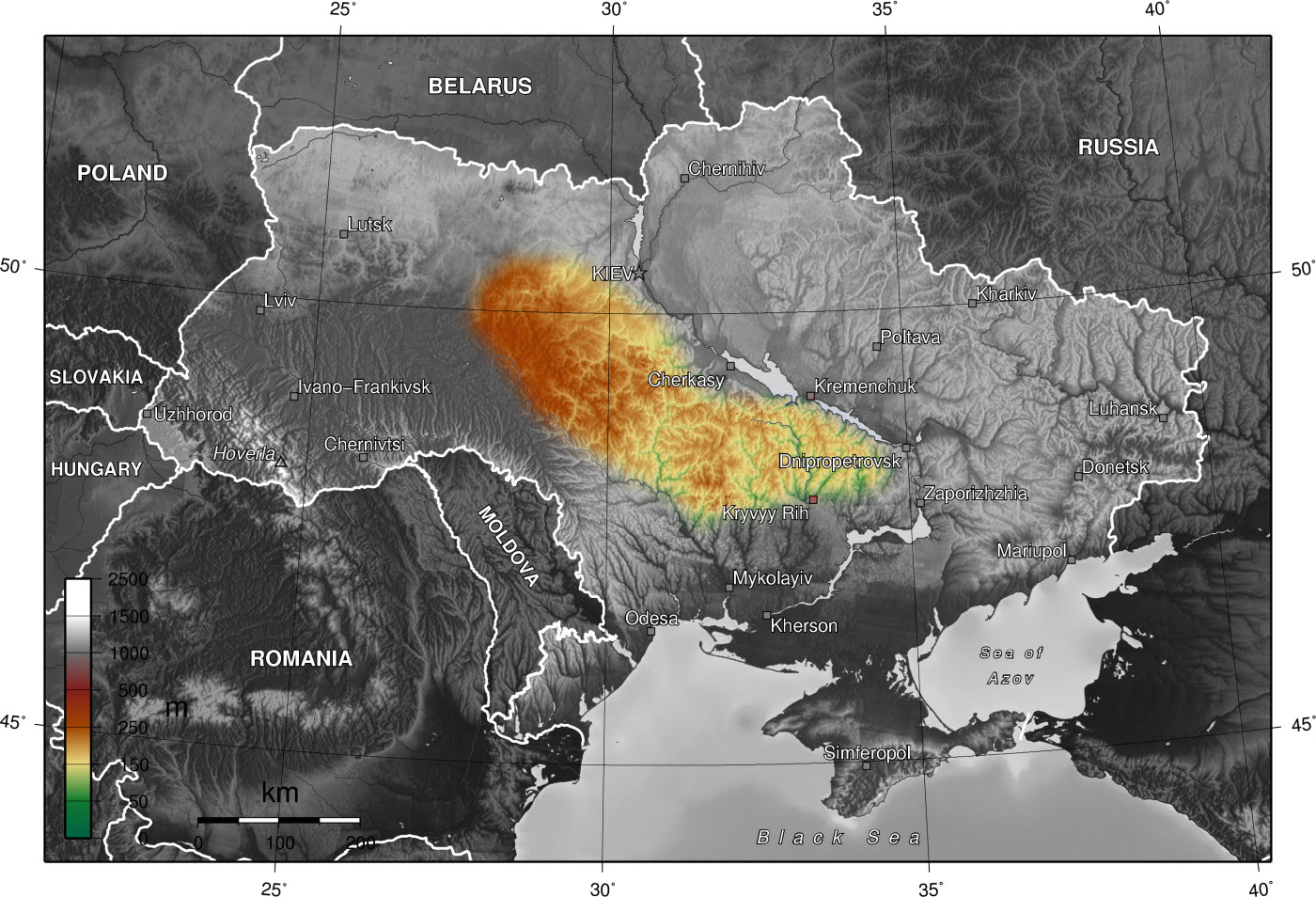

The Dnieper Upland or Cisdnieper Upland (Ukrainian: Придніпровська височина, romanized: Prydniprovska vysochyna) is a southeastern European plain occupying the territory between the Dnieper and the Southern Bug. It lies in central Ukraine, occupying the oblasts of Zhytomyr, Kyiv, Vinnytsia, Cherkasy, Kirovohrad and Dnipropetrovsk.

To its north lies Polesian Lowland, to the south lies Black Sea Lowland, eastern border is served by the Dnieper. To the west of Dnieper Upland lies uplands of Podillia and Volhynia (see Volhynian-Podolian Upland). Average heights in the northern portion vary at 220–240 m (720–790 ft) in the southern portion do not exceed 150–170 m (490–560 ft). Its maximum is at 323 m (1,060 ft) located in the northwestern portion. Among prominent features of the upland are Kyiv Mountains, Hills of Kaniv, others.

The regions is characterized by alteration of flooding watersheds with deep (up to 80–90 m (260–300 ft)) sometimes canyon-like valleys of rivers and gulches. Especially dense ravine-gulch network is in the Cis-Dnieper portion of the upland, particularly within the hills of Kaniv.

The upland contains a number of minerals including iron, manganese, granite, graphite, brown coal, kaolin etc.
