= Taras Hill =

Hill on the bank of the Dnieper near Kaniv in Ukraine

Chernecha Hill
- Taras Hill
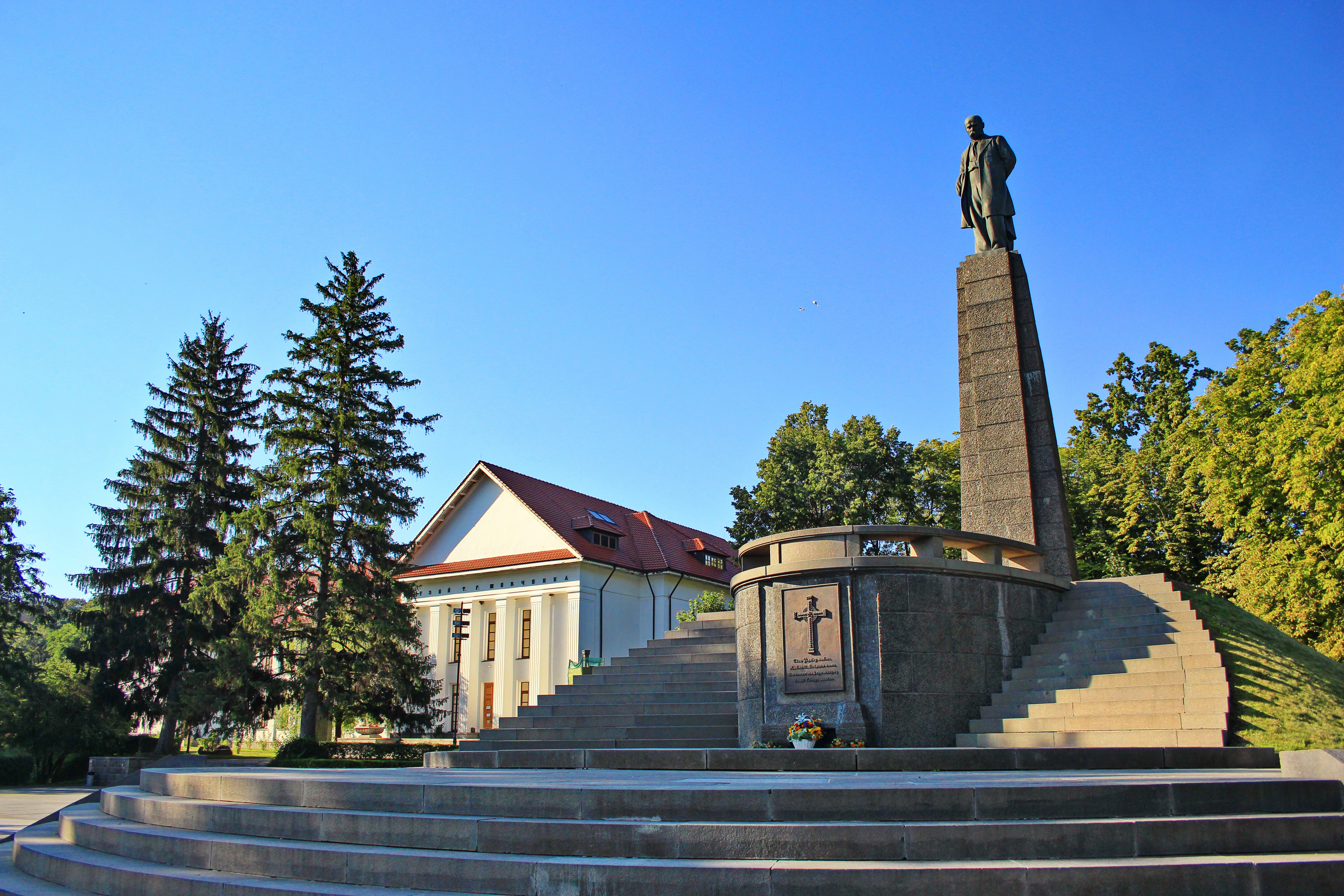
- Monument to Taras Shevchenko on his grave, with a museum dedicated to the poet in the background

Highest point
- Coordinates: 49°43′59″N 31°30′53″E

Geography
- Location within Cherkasy Oblast

Immovable Monument of National Significance of Ukraine
- Official name: Могила поета Т. Г. Шевченка (Grave of the poet T. H. Shevchenko)
- Type: History, Monumental Art
- Reference no.: 230013-Н

Taras Hill (Ukrainian: Тарасова гора) or Chernecha Hora (Чернеча гора, lit. 'Monk's Hill') is a hill on the bank of the Dnieper near Kaniv in Ukraine and an important landmark of the Shevchenko National Reserve where the remains of the famous Ukrainian poet and artist Taras Shevchenko have been buried since 1861. The original site of Shevchenko's burial is the Smolensky Cemetery in St. Petersburg and later his body was moved to the banks of Dnieper.

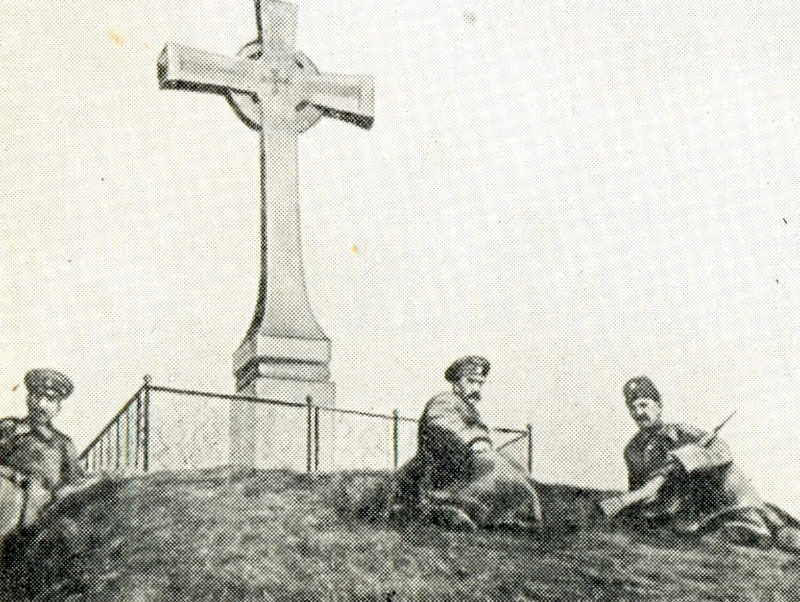
Gendarmes at Shevchenko's bronze cross on the hill, 1914

The hill formerly belonged to Kaniv's Holy Dormition monastery (Eastern Orthodox) that existed here since the 11th century. The monastery was the burial place of several hetmans of Ukraine: Ivan Pidkova, Samiylo Kishka and others.

Due to the 100th Anniversary of Shevchenko birth, in 1914, the Russian government dispatched gendarmes and Cossacks to prevent pilgrimage to the burial.

Since 1923 the hill was part of the Kaniv Nature Reserve. In 1926 the special Kaniv Museum-Reserve of Shevchenko was created. In 1939 a Russian sculptor Matvey Manizer (architect Yevgeniy Levinson) created the bronze statue that along with newly built museum building built by Ukrainian architects Vasyl Krychevsky and Petro Kostyrko became the main features of the location.

It was on the Taras Hill that Oleksa Hirnyk burned himself to death in protest of Soviet suppression of the Ukrainian language, culture and history in 1978. It happened on the 60th anniversary of the initial declaration of Ukrainian independence in 1918.

At present, the mount belongs to the Shevchenko National Reserve dedicated to the poet and is a place of mass visits from all over the country and abroad. A church in memory of Taras Shevchenko (Tarasova Tserkva) is planned to be built here.

Chernecha Hora is considered to be a historical, natural and cultural monument of national importance and a national monument of Ukraine.
