= Dyviziia rural hromada =

Coordinates: 45.815028°N 29.892583°E

Dyviziia rural hromada Дивізійська сільська громада
- Hromada
- Interactive map of Dyviziia rural hromada
- Country: Ukraine
- Oblast: Odesa Oblast
- Raion: Bilhorod-Dnistrovskyi Raion
- Admin. center: Dyviziia

Area
  - Total: 351 km^{2} (136 sq mi)

Population (2020)
  - Total: 5,717
  - Density: 16.3/km^{2} (42.2/sq mi)
- CATOTTG code: UA51040030000095700
- Settlements: 11
- Villages: 11

Dyviziia rural hromada (Ukrainian: Дивізійська сільська громада) is a hromada in Bilhorod-Dnistrovskyi Raion of Odesa Oblast in southwestern Ukraine. Population: 5,717 (2020 est.) The administrative center is the village of Dyvizia. The first elections to the community council were held on October 25, 2020.

On the area of the municipality are several large water bodies such as: Shahany Lagoon, Budury Lagoon, Karachaus Lagoon, Khadzhyder Lagoon, Alibey Lagoon, also the rivers of Khadzhyder River, Tsarychanka River. The hromada consists of 11 villages:

- Balabanka
- Vyshneve
- Dyviziia
- Zhovtyi Yar
- Kochkuvate
- Lyman
- Marazliivka
- Nove
- Rybalske
- Roilianka
- Tsarychanka

== Links ==
- Dyviziia rural hromada // Облікова картка на офіційному вебсайті Верховної Ради України.
- https://decentralization.gov.ua/newgromada/4330#
