= Tuzly Lagoons National Nature Park =

National park in Ukraine

Coordinates: 45°47′N 30°00′E

- IUCN category II (national park)
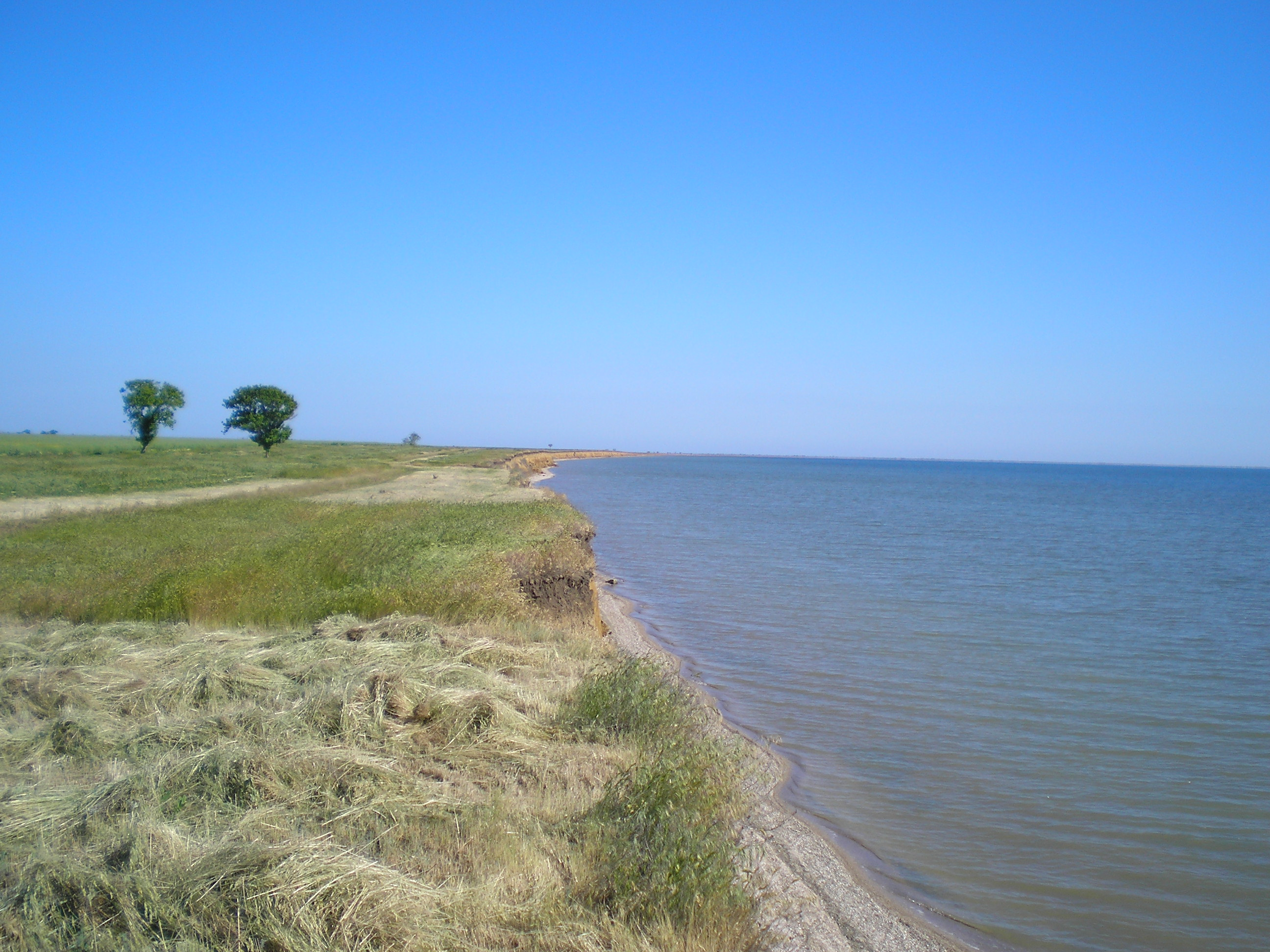
- Coast of Alibey Lagoon, part of the Tuzly group.
- Location: Bilhorod-Dnistrovskyi Raion, Odesa Oblast, Ukraine
- Nearest city: Tatarbunary
- Area: 278.65 km^{2} (107.59 sq mi)
- Established: January 1, 2010
- Website: http://tuzlim.org.ua/uk/

The Tuzly Lagoons National Nature Park (Ukrainian: Національний природний парк «Тузловські лимани», romanized: Tuzlovs'ki lymany) is a protected area located in Bilhorod-Dnistrovskyi Raion of Odesa Oblast, southern Ukraine. The park was set up by decree of the President of Ukraine, Viktor Yushchenko, on January 1, 2010.

== Geography ==
The territory of the National Park includes the group of Tuzly Lagoons, which consist of

- parts of the larger lagoons: Shahany, Alibey, Burnas; and
- the small lagoons Solone Ozero, Khadzhyder, Karachaus, Budury, Martaza, Mahala, Malyi Sasyk, and Dzhantshey.

== Flora and fauna ==
The area is mainly home to salt-loving plants. Rare stands of small seagrass (Zostera noltii) can be found on the Black Sea coast. The estuaries have a high biodiversity and are particularly important for birds. For example, the avocet (Recurvirostra avosetta), black-winged stilt (Himantopus himantopus), stone-curlew (Burhinus oedicnemus), collared pratincole (Glareola pratincola) and Black-winged pratincole (Glareola nordmanni) live here. Some mammals in the area are the lesser blind mole-rat (Spalax leucodon) and stoat (Mustela erminea).

Following the Russian invasion of Ukraine in 2022, dead Black Sea bottlenose dolphins washed up at the park's coastline. This continued until 2023 when the fighting in the Black Sea shifted further east.

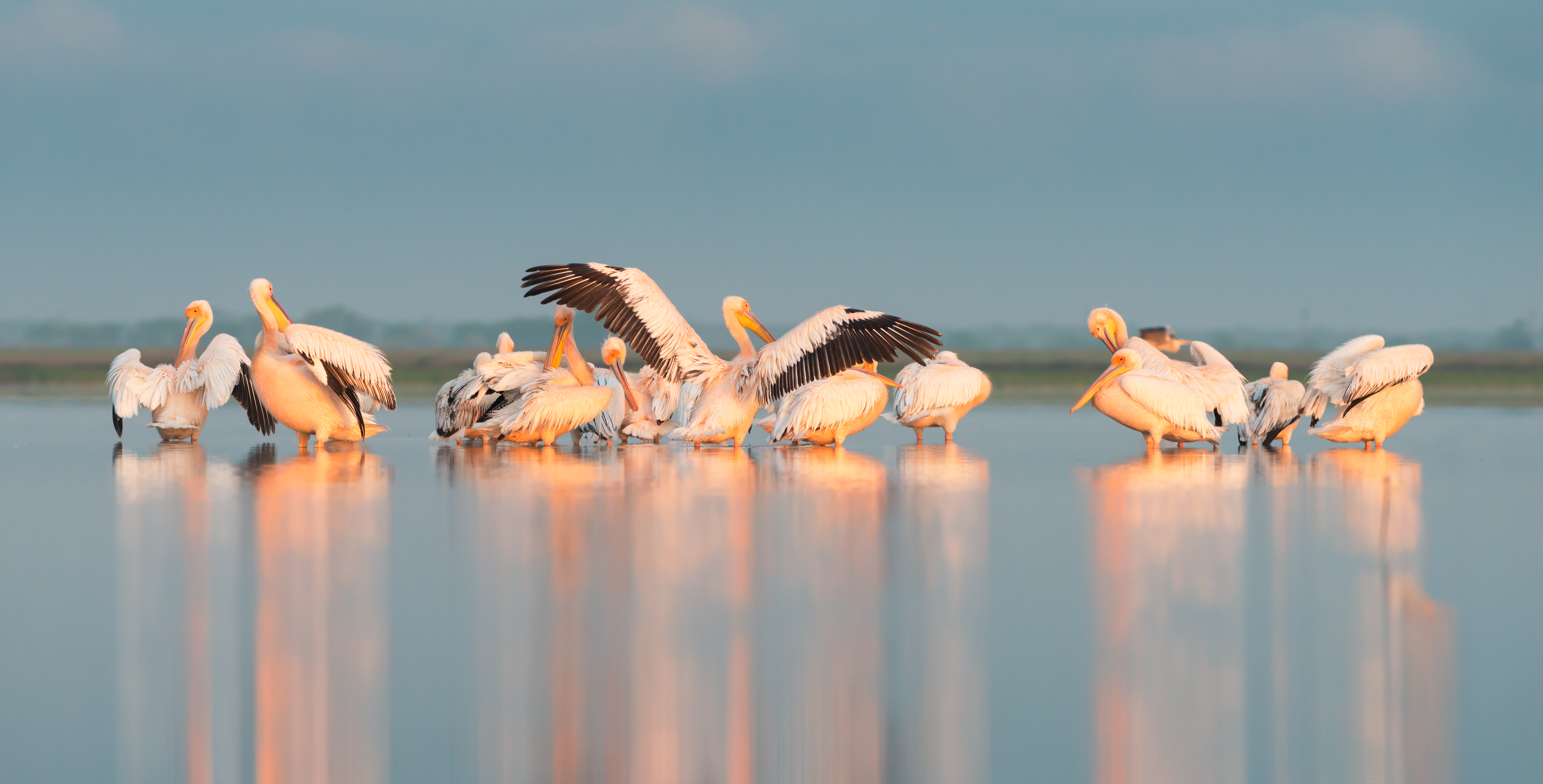
Great white pelicans on Tuzla Lagoons

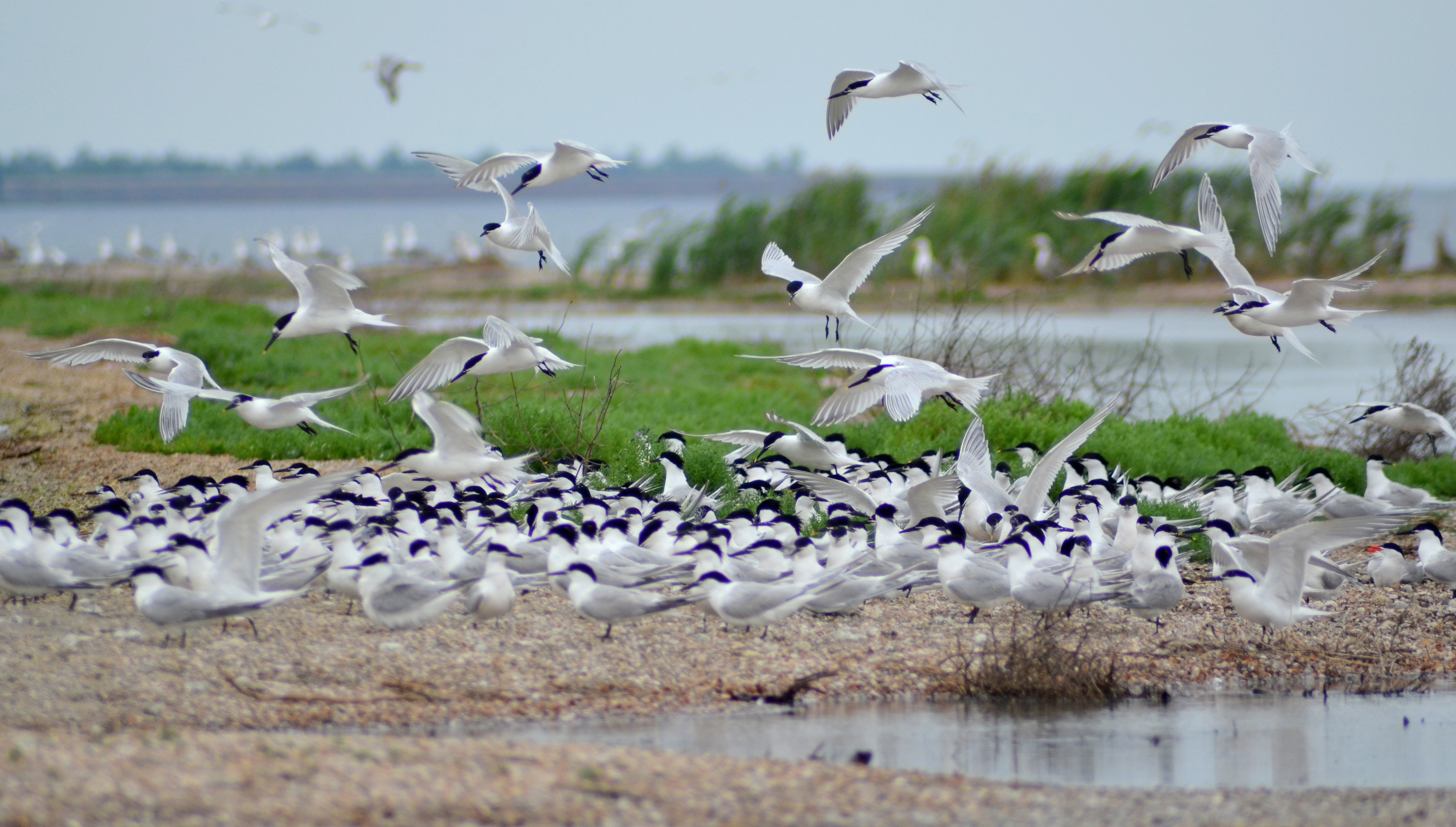
Colony of Sandwich Terns (Thalasseus sandvicensis).

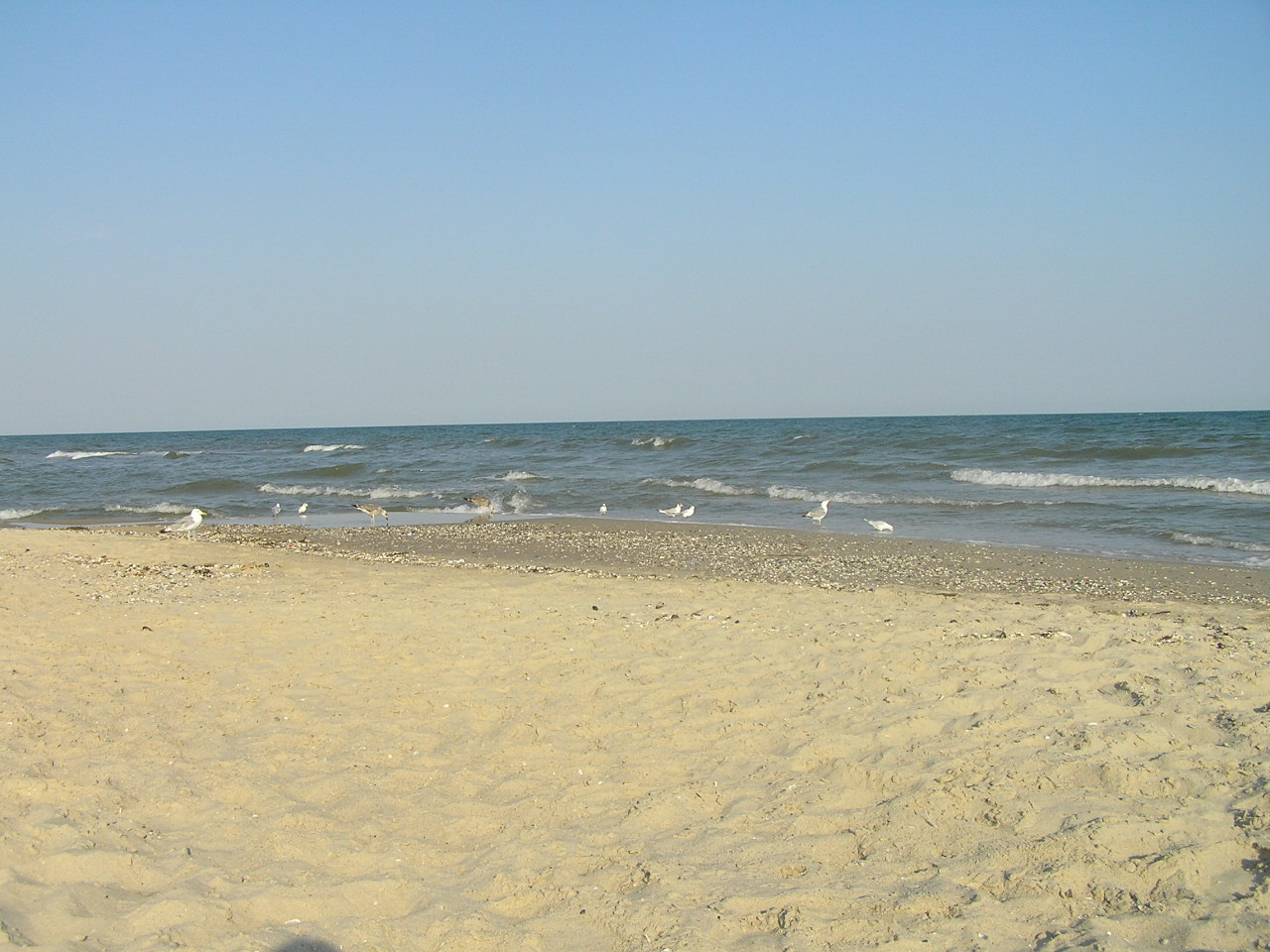
Black Sea Coast.

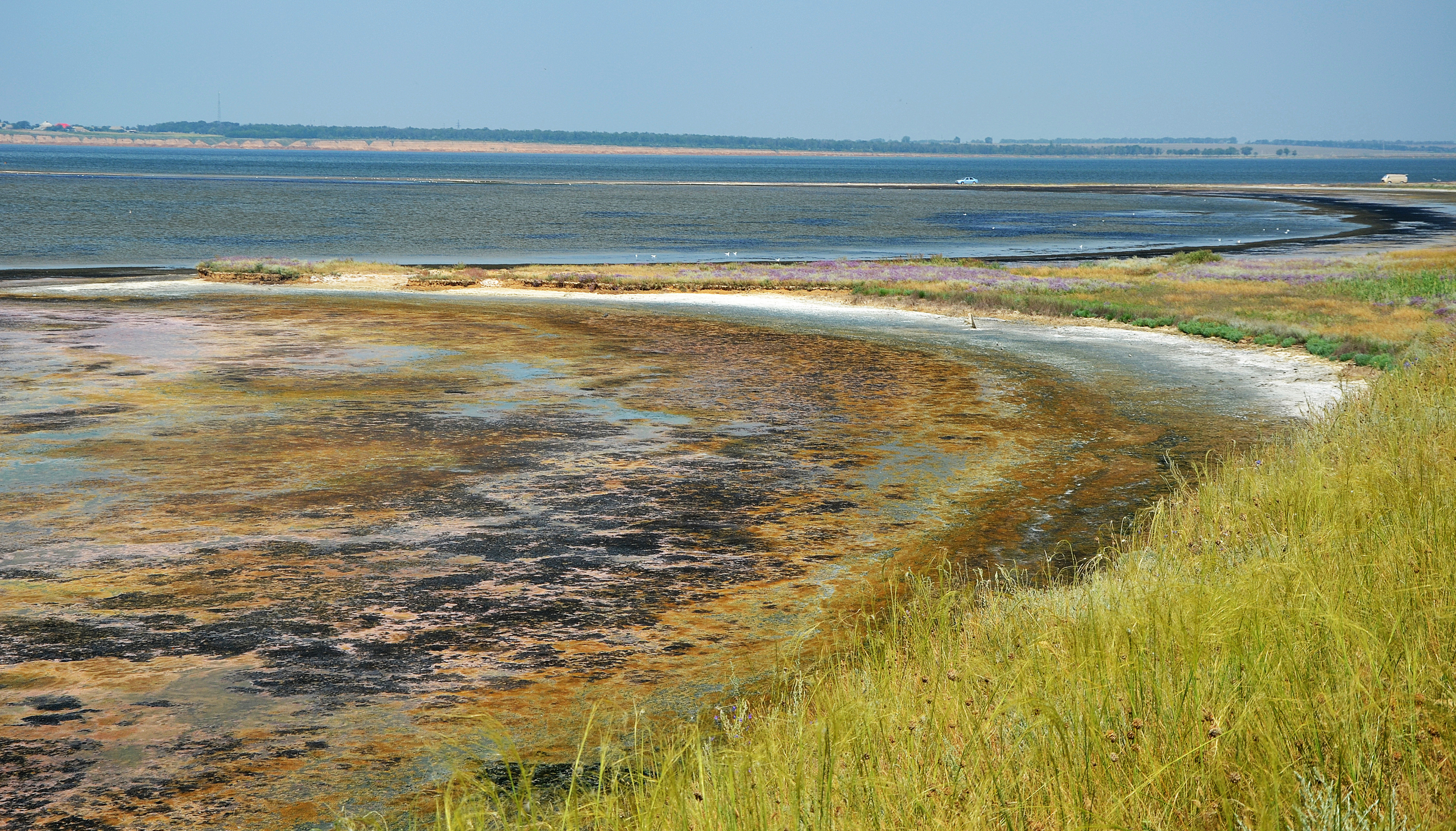
Estuary.

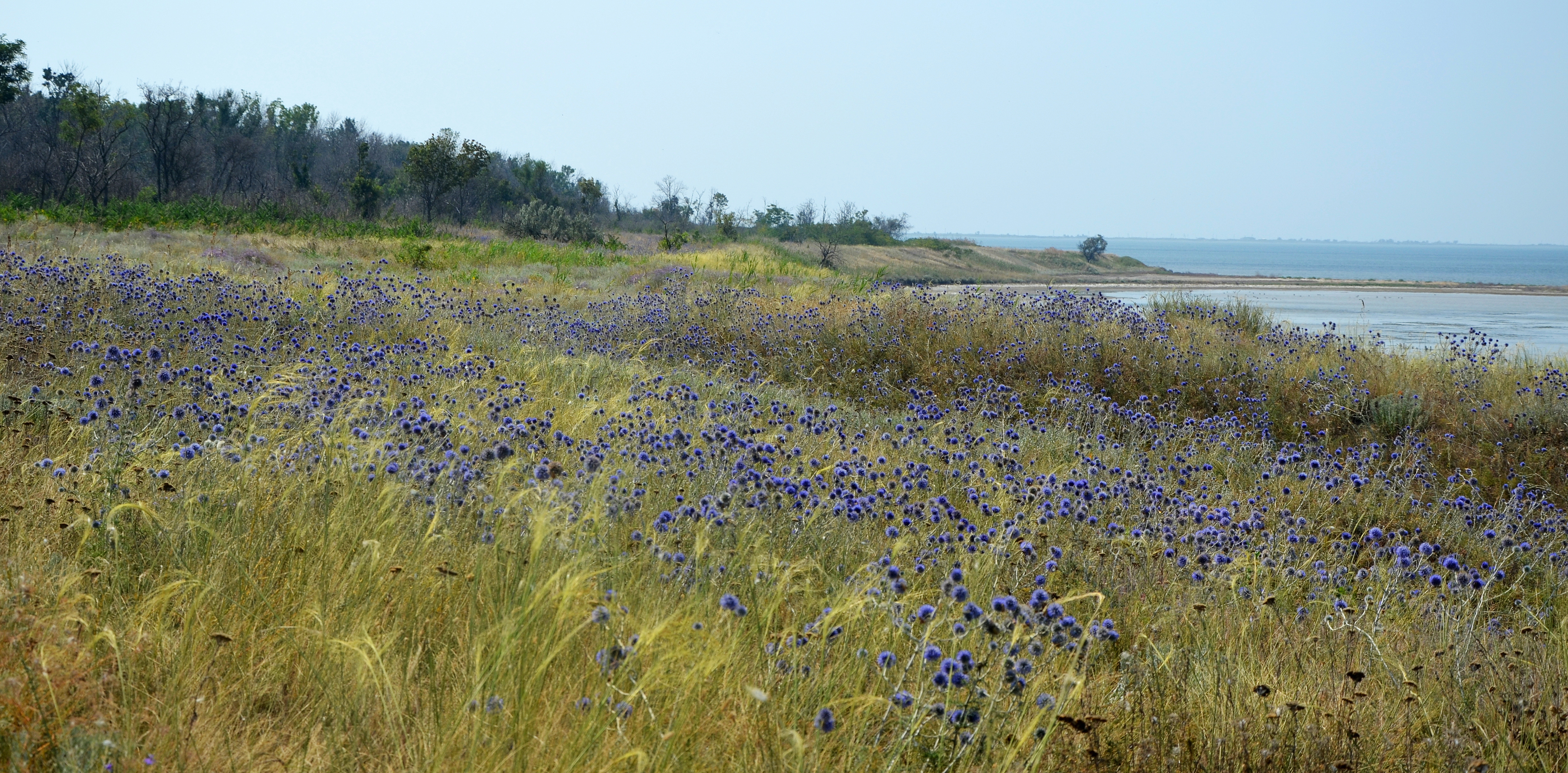
Coastal vegetation.

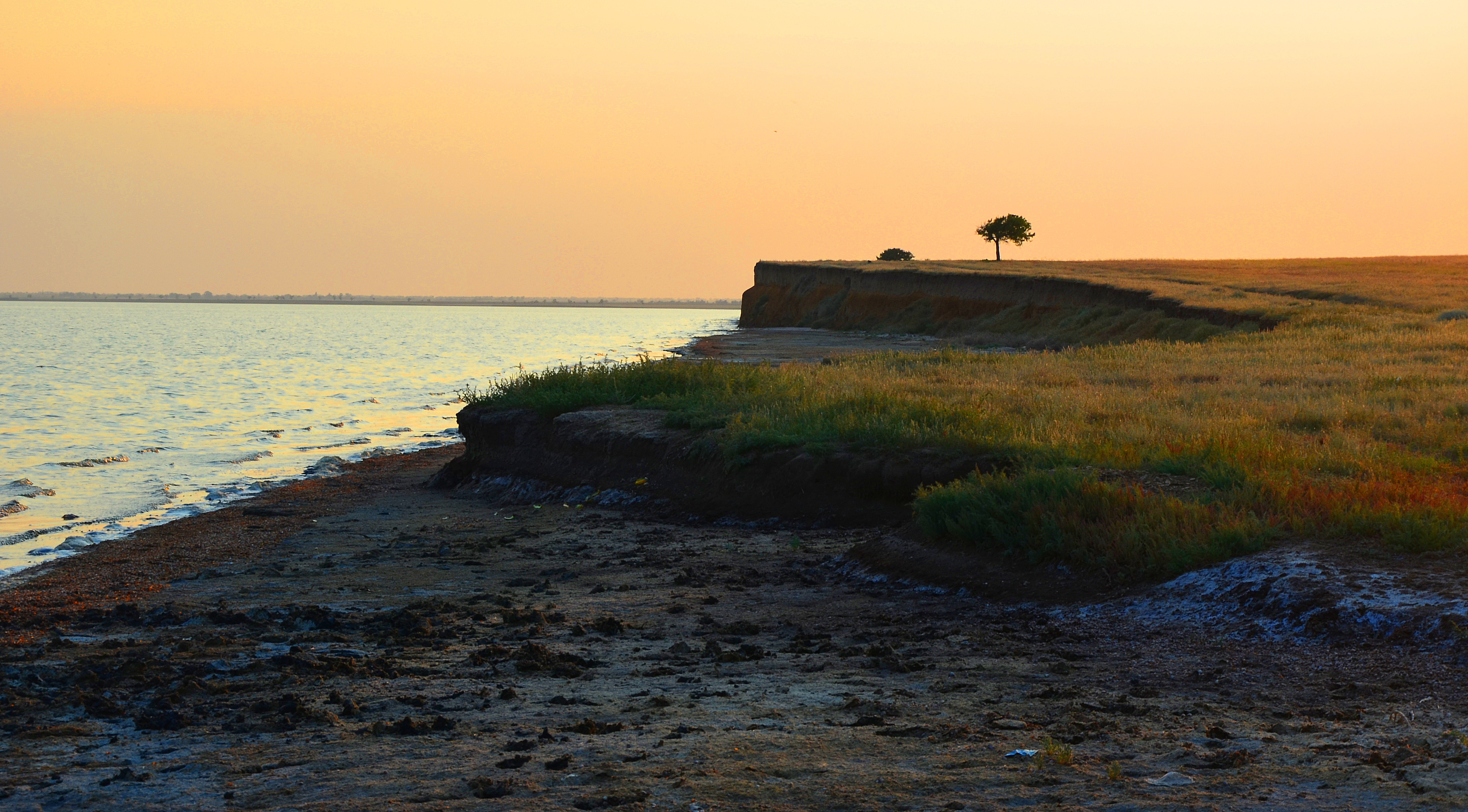
Sunset in the Tuzlovsky Lymany National Park.

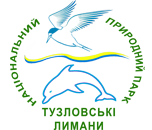
Park Logo

== See also ==
- Tuzly Lagoons
- National parks of Ukraine
