= Tuzly Lagoons =

Group of marine lagoons in Ukraine

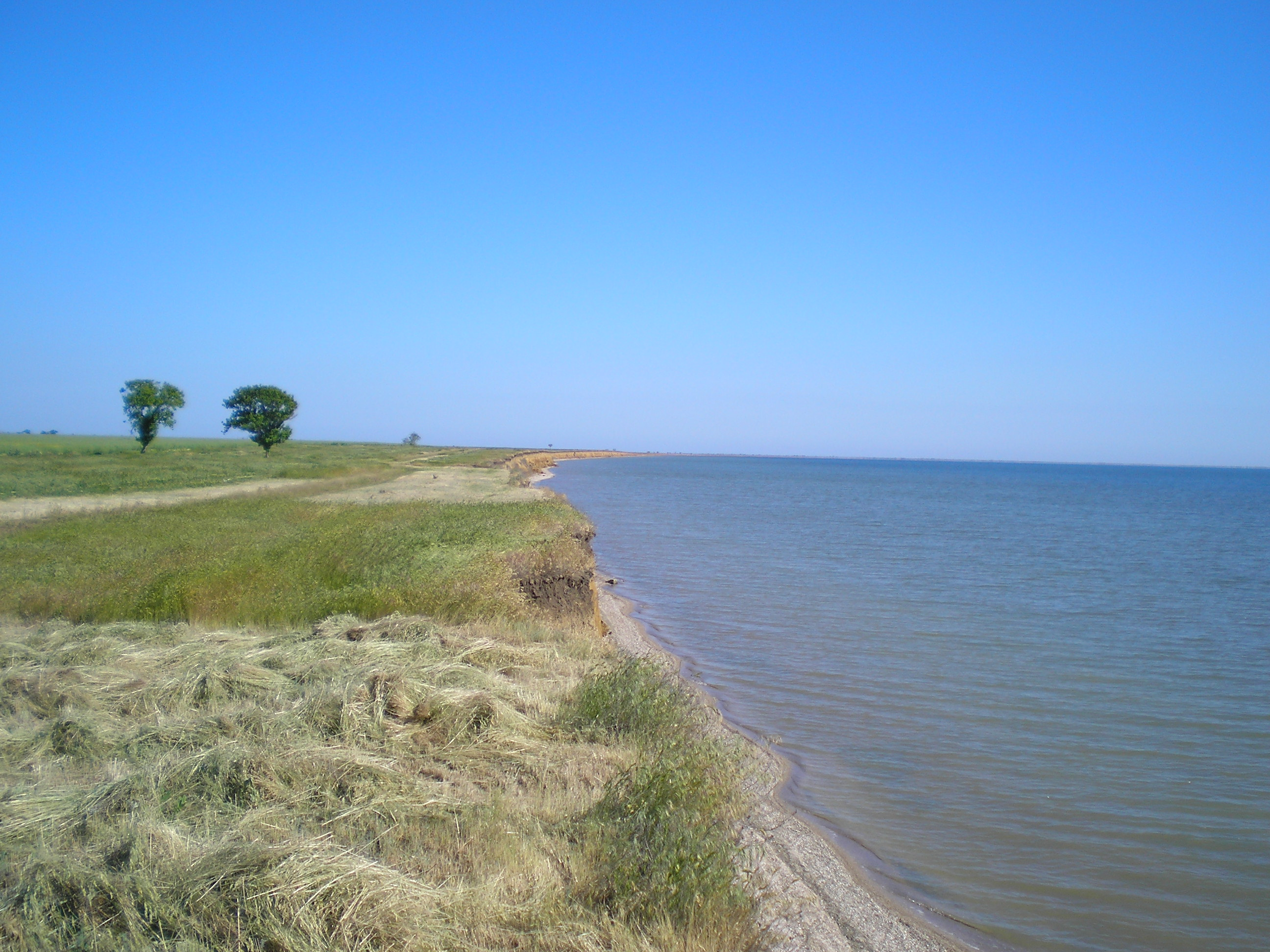
- Northern coast of Alibey Lagoon, one of the 3 main lagoons in the group.

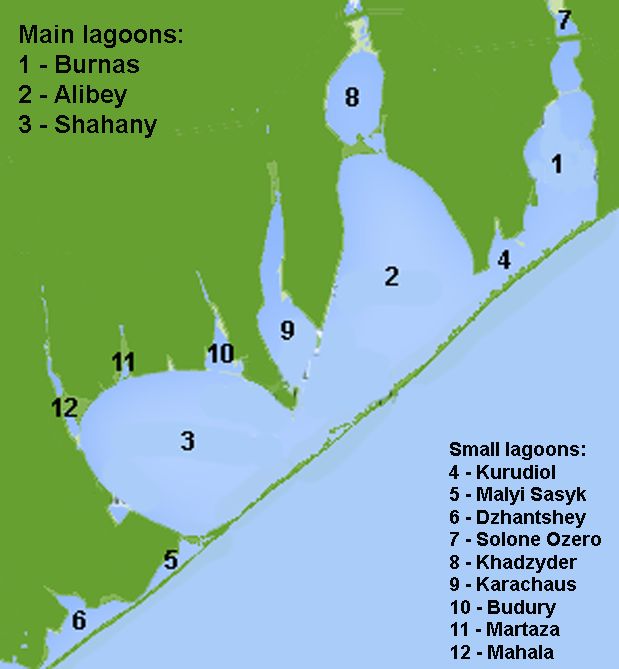
- The schematic map of the Tuzly Lagoons

- Location within Odesa Oblast
- Location: Black Sea
- Coordinates: 45°47′N 30°00′E
- Ocean/sea sources: Atlantic Ocean
- Basin countries: Ukraine
- Max. length: 29 km (18 mi)
- Surface area: 206 km^{2} (80 sq mi)
- Average depth: 1.0–1.3 m (3.3–4.3 ft)
- Max. depth: 2.5 m (8.2 ft)
- Salinity: 18-40 ‰

Ramsar Wetland
- Official name: Shagany-Alibei-Burnas Lakes System
- Designated: 23 November 1995
- Reference no.: 763

Tuzly Lagoons (Ukrainian: Тузловські лимани; Romanian: Limanele Tuzlei) are a group of marine lagoons (limans) in southern Bessarabia (Budjak), Ukraine. The lagoons are part of the Tuzly Lagoons National Nature Park, proclaimed on January 1, 2010. It is also a Ramsar site since 1996 due to its ecological significance.. The name of the lagoons originates from the Turkish: Tuzlu, which means salty.

The group includes three main lagoons: Shahany, Alibey, and Burnas, and also smaller lagoons: Solone Ozero, Khadzhyder, Karachaus, Budury, Kurudiol, Martaza, Mahala, Malyi Sasyk, and Dzhantshey.

The total area of the lagoons is 206 km^{2}, depth 1.6–2.5 m, averaging 1.0–1.3 m. The lagoons are separated from the Black Sea by a 29-km long sandbar, which is 60–400 m wide and 1–3 m high.

== Biodiversity ==
There are over 40 species of rare birds located within the lagoons that are listed in the Red Book of Ukraine, around 60 species of fish, and 37 species of mammals. The lagoons serve as a stopover and breeding site for migratory birds, including the Greater flamingo, European roller, and more recently the Golden jackal, which was first recognized in the lagoons in the 2000s. The vegetation mainly consists of communities of Zostera noltei, a marine grass species listed in the Green Book of Ukraine. Seasonal wildflower displays such as poppy fields, are characteristic of the area in the spring. Starting in 2024-25, the lagoons experienced a large number of geese arriving from occupied areas of Kherson Oblast and Crimea.

== Environmental issues ==
In 2020, several of the lagoons experienced significant drying due to disrupted water exchange with the Black Sea, and five of the thirteen lagoons in the system were reported as dry with salt deposits starting to form. This was offset by a natural beach forming in 2021, which partially restored the water flow to the lagoons. Since the Russian invasion of Ukraine, the lagoon system has also been impacted by Russian shelling and missile debris, alongside mine contamination, which has led to an increase in mortality of the animals in the lagoons (most notably the dolphins and other cetaceans).
