= Dzhantshey Lagoon =

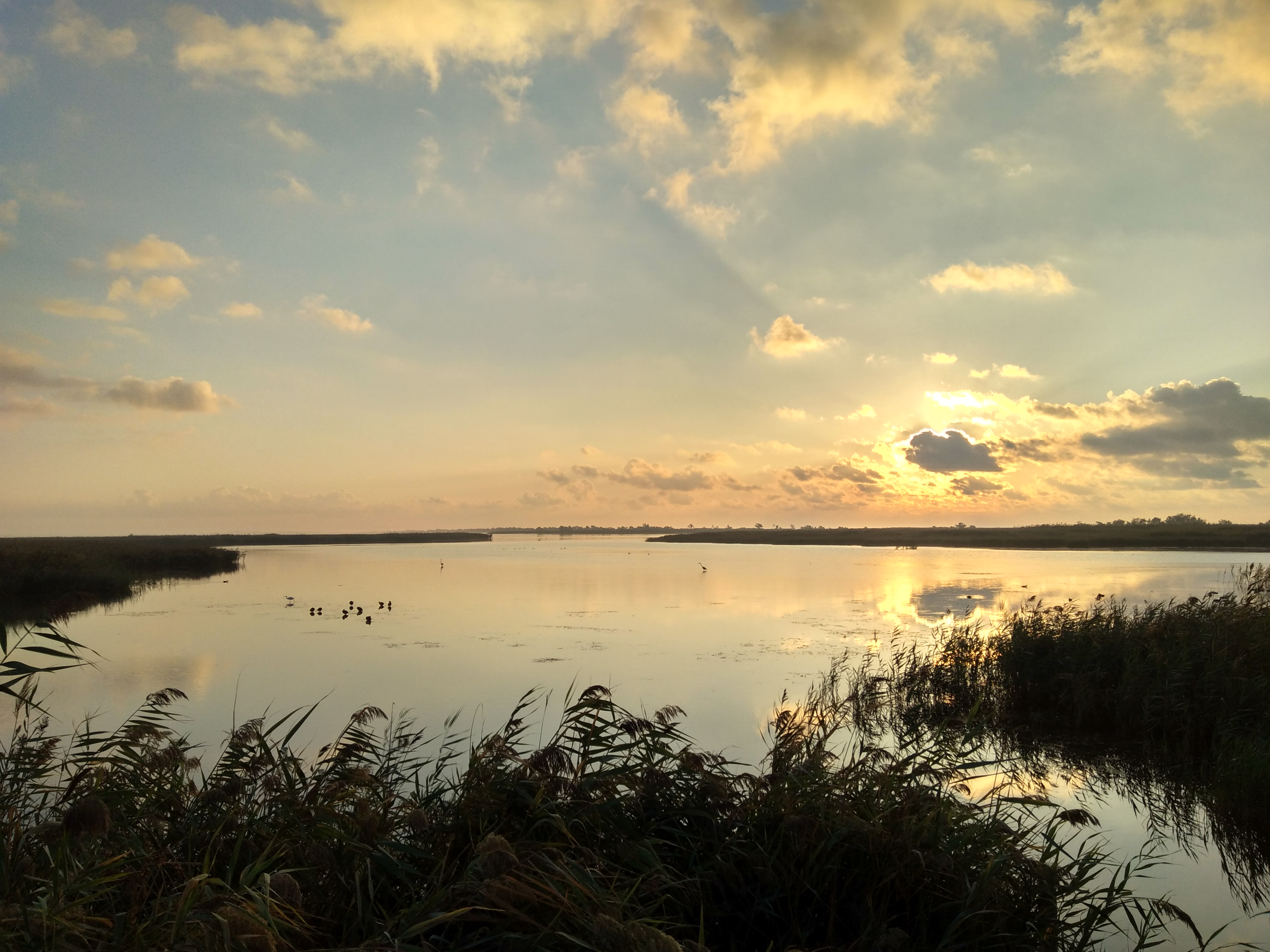
- Dzhantshey Lagoon

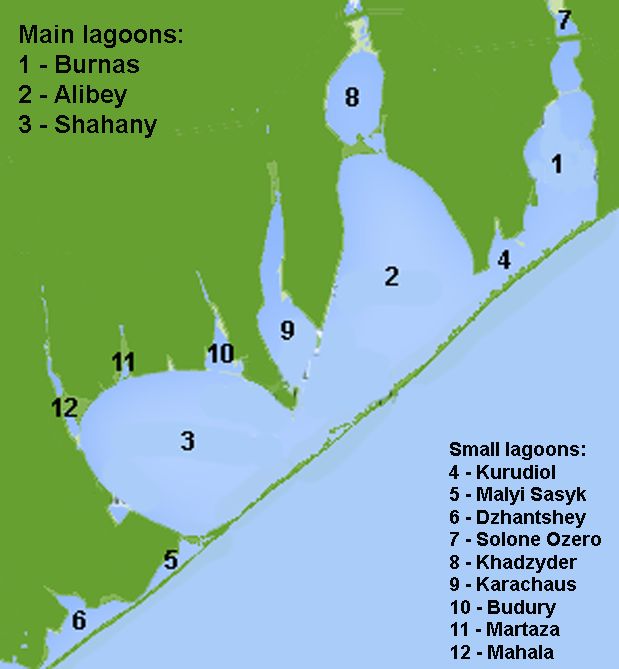
- The Dzhantshey Lagoon on the schematic map of the Tuzly Lagoons (#6)

- Location within Odesa Oblast
- Location: Black Sea
- Coordinates: 45°38′N 29°48′E
- Ocean/sea sources: Atlantic Ocean
- Basin countries: Ukraine
- Surface area: 6.92 km^{2} (2.67 sq mi)

Dzhantshey Lagoon (Ukrainian: Джантшей; Romanian: Djantşai) is a salty lagoon in the Tuzly Lagoons group in Bilhorod-Dnistrovskyi Raion of Odesa Oblast, Ukraine. The southmost water body of the lagoons group. It is located to north-east from the Sasyk Lagoon. The total area of the lagoon is 6.92 km^{2}. The lagoon is connected with the Malyi Sasyk Lagoon in its north part.

The touristic village of Rasseyka is located on the north-west coast of the lagoon, in the place of connecting of the lagoon with the Malyi Sasyk. The lagoon is separated from the Black Sea by the sandbar with the marine beaches.

The water body is included to the Tuzly Lagoons National Nature Park.

== Sources ==
- Starushenko L.I., Bushuyev S.G. (2001) Prichernomorskiye limany Odeschiny i ih rybohoziaystvennoye znacheniye. Astroprint, Odesa, 151 pp. (in Russian)
