= Martaza Lagoon =

Lagoon in Odesa Oblast, Ukraine

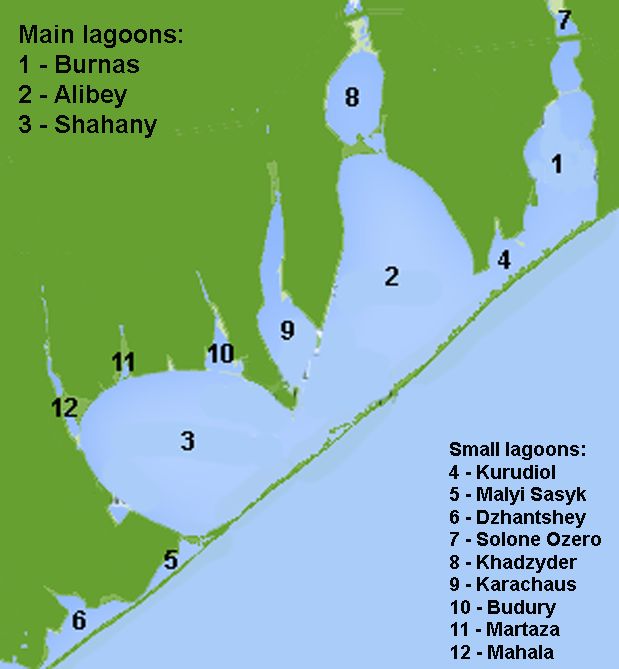
- The Martaza Lagoon on the schematic map of the Tuzly Lagoons (#11)

- Location within Odesa Oblast
- Location: Black Sea
- Coordinates: 45°45′11.2″N 29°49′47.2″E
- Ocean/sea sources: Atlantic Ocean
- Basin countries: Ukraine
- Surface area: 50 ha (120 acres)

Martaza Lagoon (Ukrainian: Мартаза; Romanian: Caraceauş) is a small salty lagoon in the Tuzly Lagoons group in Bilhorod-Dnistrovskyi Raion of Odesa Oblast, Ukraine. It is separated from the Shahany Lagoon by the sandbar in its north part, near the village of Rybalske (old name - Martaza). The total area of the lagoon is 0.5 km^{2}.

The water body is included to the Tuzly Lagoons National Nature Park.

== Sources ==
- Starushenko L.I., Bushuyev S.G. (2001) Prichernomorskiye limany Odeschiny i ih rybohoziaystvennoye znacheniye. Astroprint, Odesa, 151 pp. (in Russian)
