= Kurudiol Lagoon =

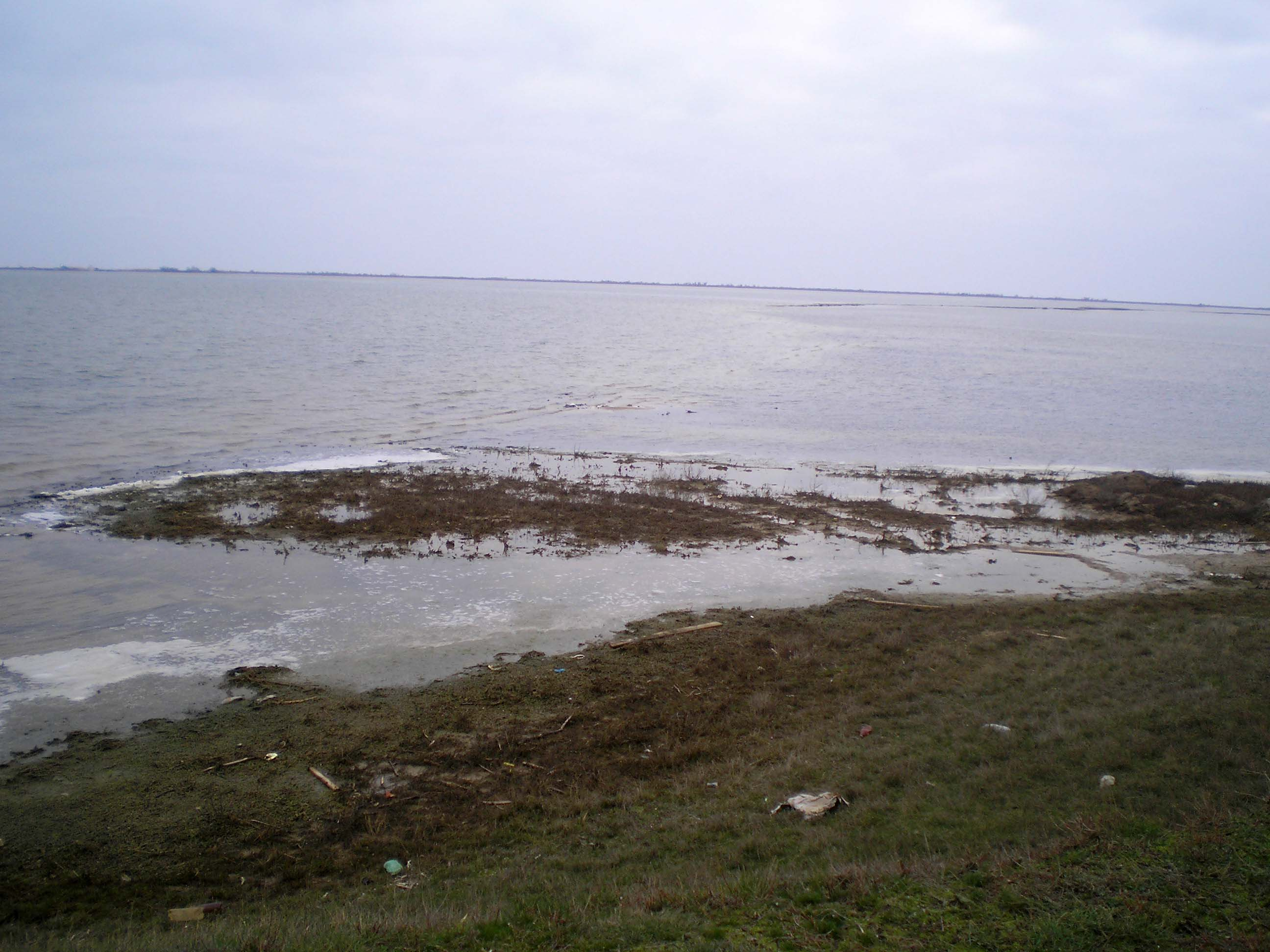
- Coasts of the lagoon

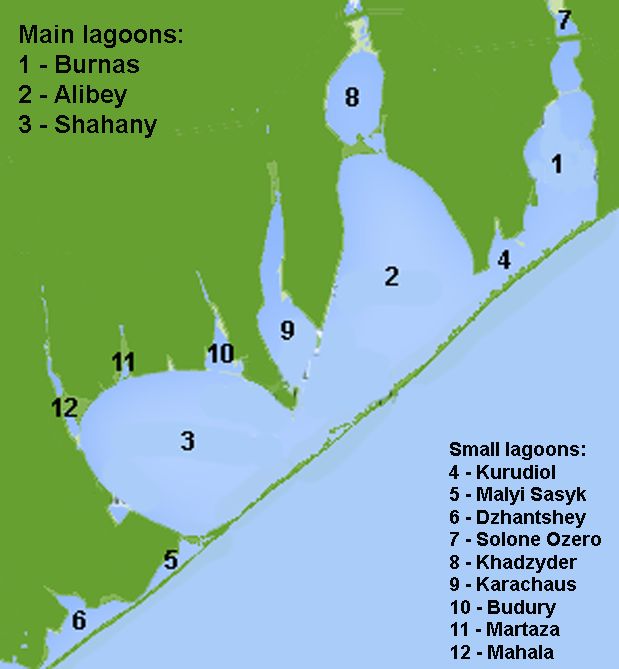
- The Kurudiol Lagoon on the schematic map of the Tuzly Lagoons (#4)

- Location within Odesa Oblast
- Location: Black Sea
- Coordinates: 45°48′05.2″N 30°04′51.9″E
- Ocean/sea sources: Atlantic Ocean
- Basin countries: Ukraine

Kurudiol Lagoon (Ukrainian: Курудіол; Romanian: Curughiol; Turkish: Kurugöl) is a salty lagoon in the Tuzly Lagoons group in Bilhorod-Dnistrovskyi Raion of Odesa Oblast, Ukraine. It is located between the Alibey and Burnas Lagoons. The water body is included to the Tuzly Lagoons National Nature Park.

== Sources ==
- Starushenko L.I., Bushuyev S.G. (2001) Prichernomorskiye limany Odeschiny i ih rybohoziaystvennoye znacheniye. Astroprint, Odesa, 151 pp. (in Russian)
