= Malyi Sasyk Lagoon =

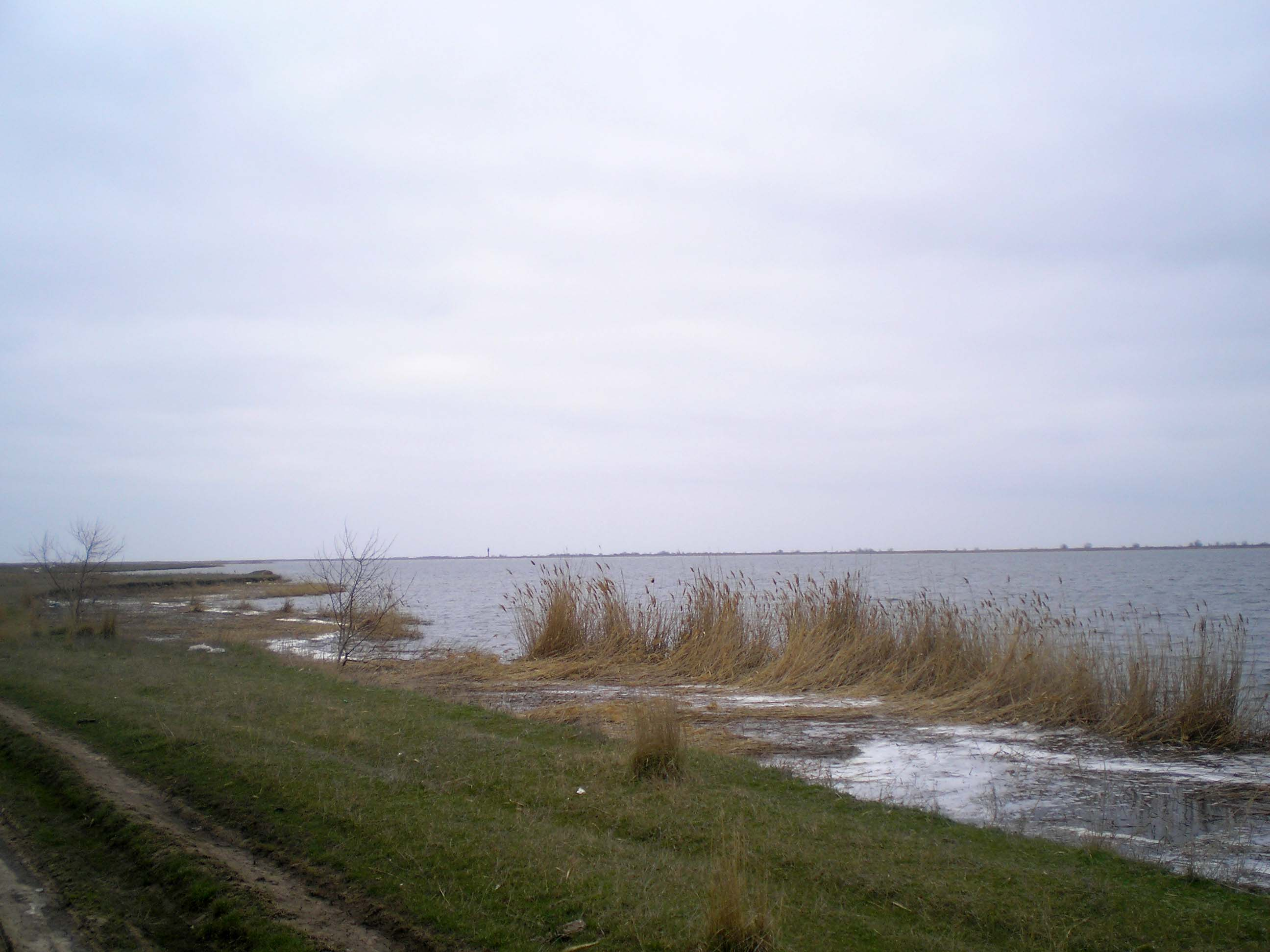
- Coasts of the lagoon

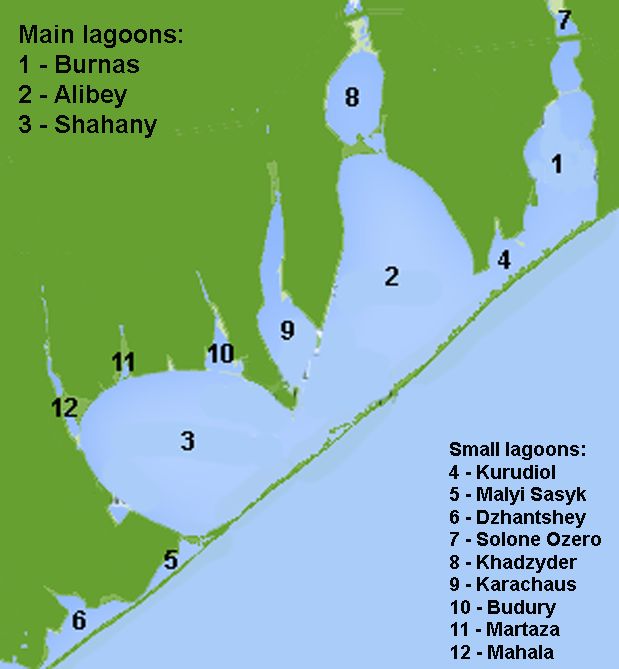
- The Malyi Sasyk Lagoon on the schematic map of the Tuzly Lagoons (#5)

- Location within Odesa Oblast
- Location: Black Sea
- Coordinates: 45°39′46.6″N 29°51′32.1″E
- Ocean/sea sources: Atlantic Ocean
- Basin countries: Ukraine
- Surface area: 2.36 km^{2} (0.91 sq mi)

Malyi Sasyk Lagoon, or Small Sasyk (Ukrainian: Малий Сасик; Romanian: Sasicul Mic), is a salty lagoon in the Tuzly Lagoons group in Bilhorod-Dnistrovskyi Raion of Odesa Oblast, Ukraine. It is located to south from the Shahany Lagoon. The total area of the lagoon is 2.36 km^{2}. The lagoon is connected with the Dzhantshey Lagoon in south.

The touristic village of Rasseyka is located on the north-west coast of the lagoon. The lagoon is separated from the Black Sea and also from the Shahany Lagoon by the sandbar with the marine beaches. The continental coast is connected with the sandbar by 6 bridges.

The water body is included into the Tuzly Lagoons National Nature Park.

== Sources ==
- Starushenko L.I., Bushuyev S.G. (2001) Prichernomorskiye limany Odeschiny i ih rybohoziaystvennoye znacheniye. Astroprint, Odesa, 151 pp. (in Russian)
