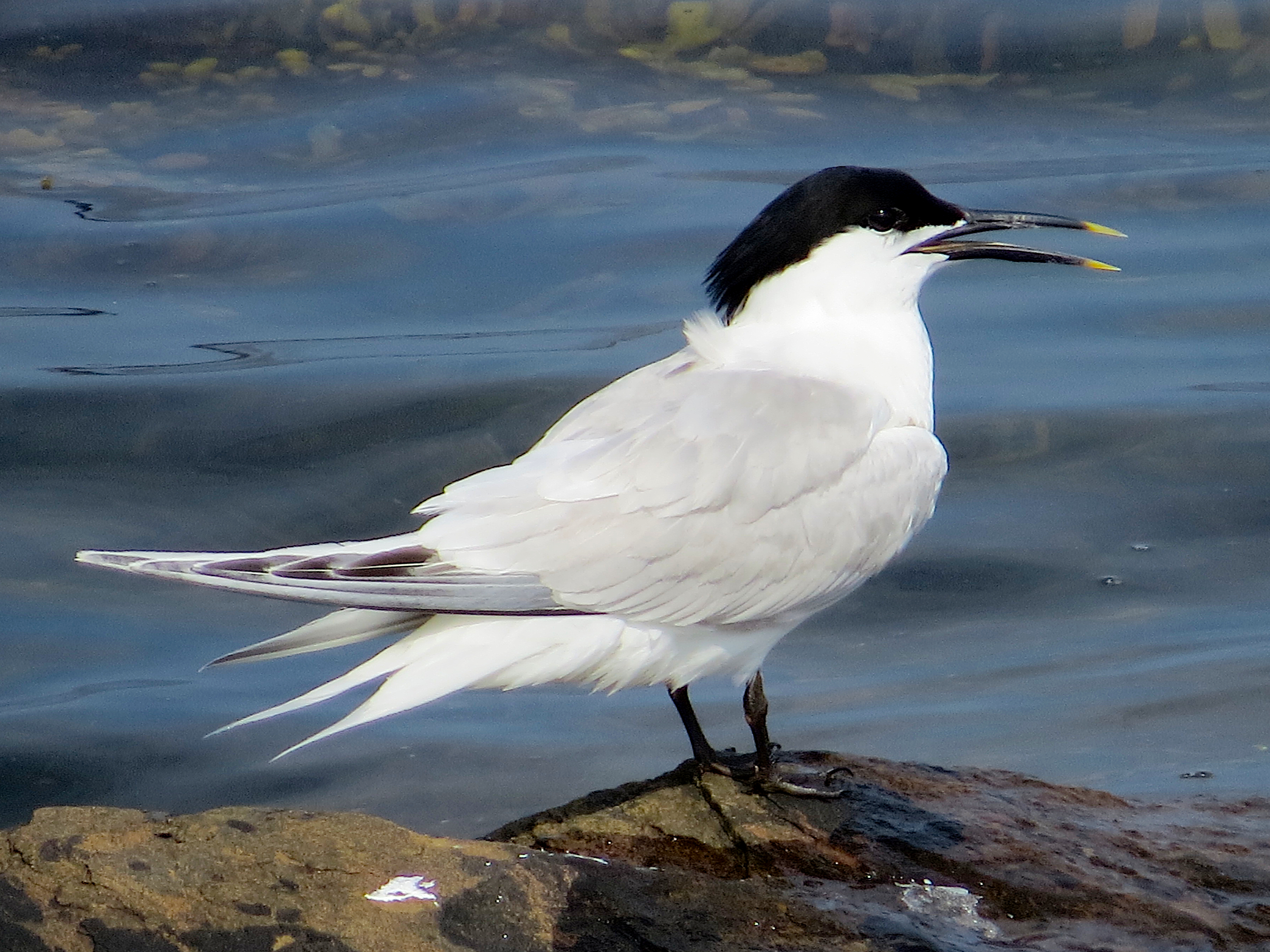
- Adult in breeding plumage, Northumberland, UK

Conservation status
- Least Concern (IUCN 3.1)

Scientific classification
- Kingdom: Animalia
- Phylum: Chordata
- Class: Aves
- Order: Charadriiformes
- Family: Laridae
- Genus: Thalasseus
- Species: T. sandvicensis

Binomial name
- Thalasseus sandvicensis (Latham, 1787)
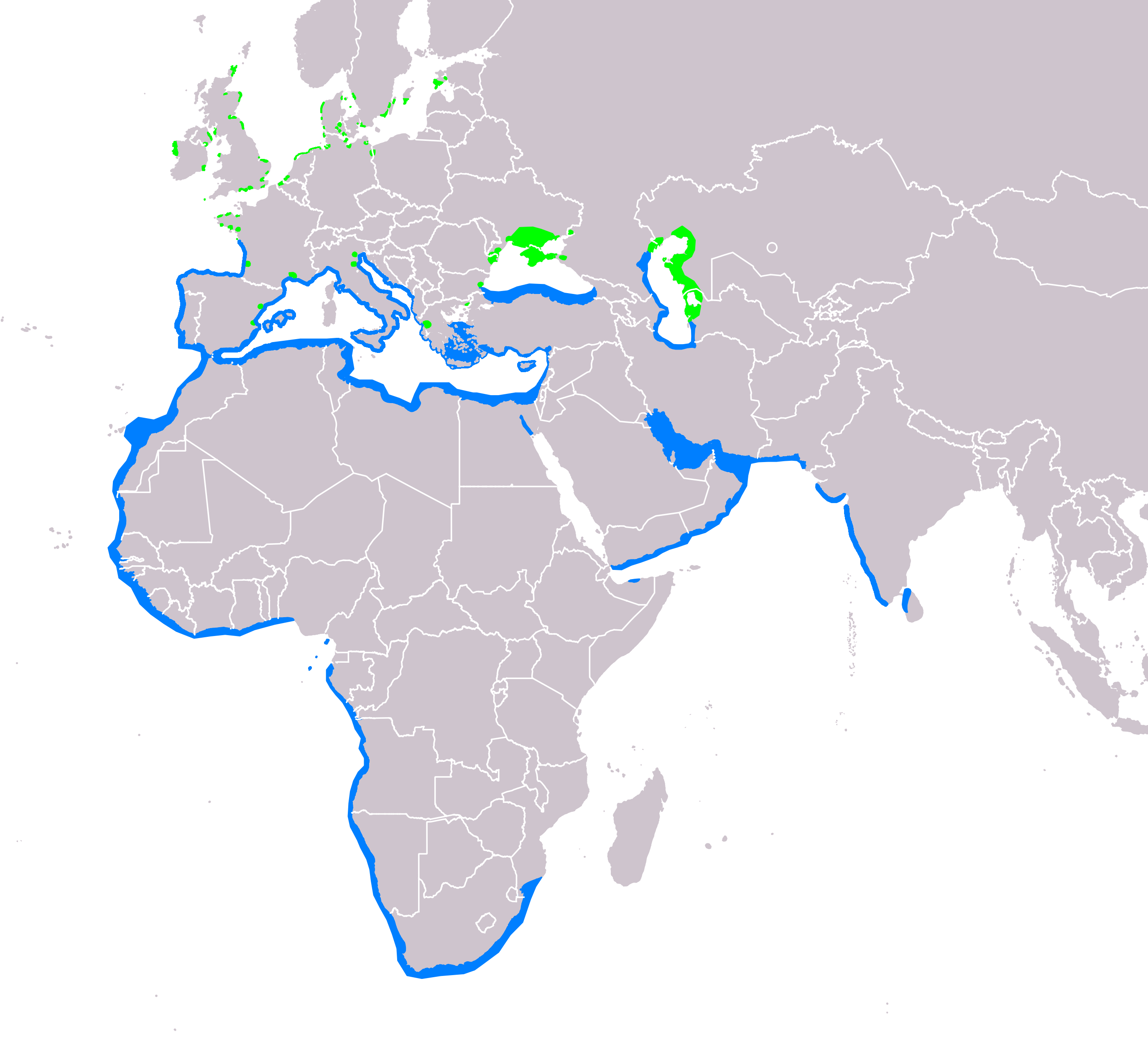
- Green: breeding colonies Blue: wintering range

Synonyms
- Sterna sandvicensis Sterna cantiaca Gmelin, 1788

= Sandwich tern =

Species of bird

The Sandwich tern (Thalasseus sandvicensis) is a tern in the family Laridae. It is very closely related to the lesser crested tern (T. bengalensis), Chinese crested tern (T. bernsteini), Cabot's tern (T. acuflavidus), and elegant tern (T. elegans) and has been known to interbreed with both elegant and lesser crested terns. It breeds in the Palearctic from Europe to the Caspian Sea, and winters in the Mediterranean and on the coasts of Africa, India, and Sri Lanka.

The Sandwich tern is a medium-large tern with pale silvery-grey upperparts, white underparts, a yellow-tipped black bill, and a shaggy black crest which becomes less extensive in winter with a white crown. Young birds bear grey and blackish scalloped plumage on their backs and wings. It is a vocal bird. It nests in a ground scrape and lays one to three eggs.

Like all Thalasseus terns, the Sandwich tern feeds by plunge-diving for fish, usually in marine environments, and the offering of fish by the male to the female is part of the courtship display.

== Taxonomy ==
The terns are small to medium-sized seabirds, gull-like in appearance, but usually with a more delicate, lighter build and shorter, weaker legs. They have long, pointed wings, which gives them a fast buoyant flight, and often a deeply forked tail. Most species are grey above and white below, and have a black cap, which is reduced or flecked with white in the winter.

The Sandwich tern was originally described by ornithologist John Latham in 1787 as Sterna sandvicensis but was moved to its current genus, Thalasseus (Boie, 1822), following mitochondrial DNA studies, which confirmed that the three types of head pattern (white crown, black cap, and black cap with a white blaze on the forehead) found among the terns corresponded to distinct clades. The current genus name is derived from Greek Thalassa, "sea", and sandvicensis, like the English name, refers to Sandwich, Kent, Latham's type locality.

This bird has no subspecies. Two former subspecies are now treated as a separate species, Cabot's tern (T. acuflavidus); this breeds on the Atlantic coasts of North America, northern and eastern South America, and has wandered to Western Europe. Cabot's tern was separated from Sandwich tern as it is genetically closer to elegant tern than to Sandwich tern.

== Description ==
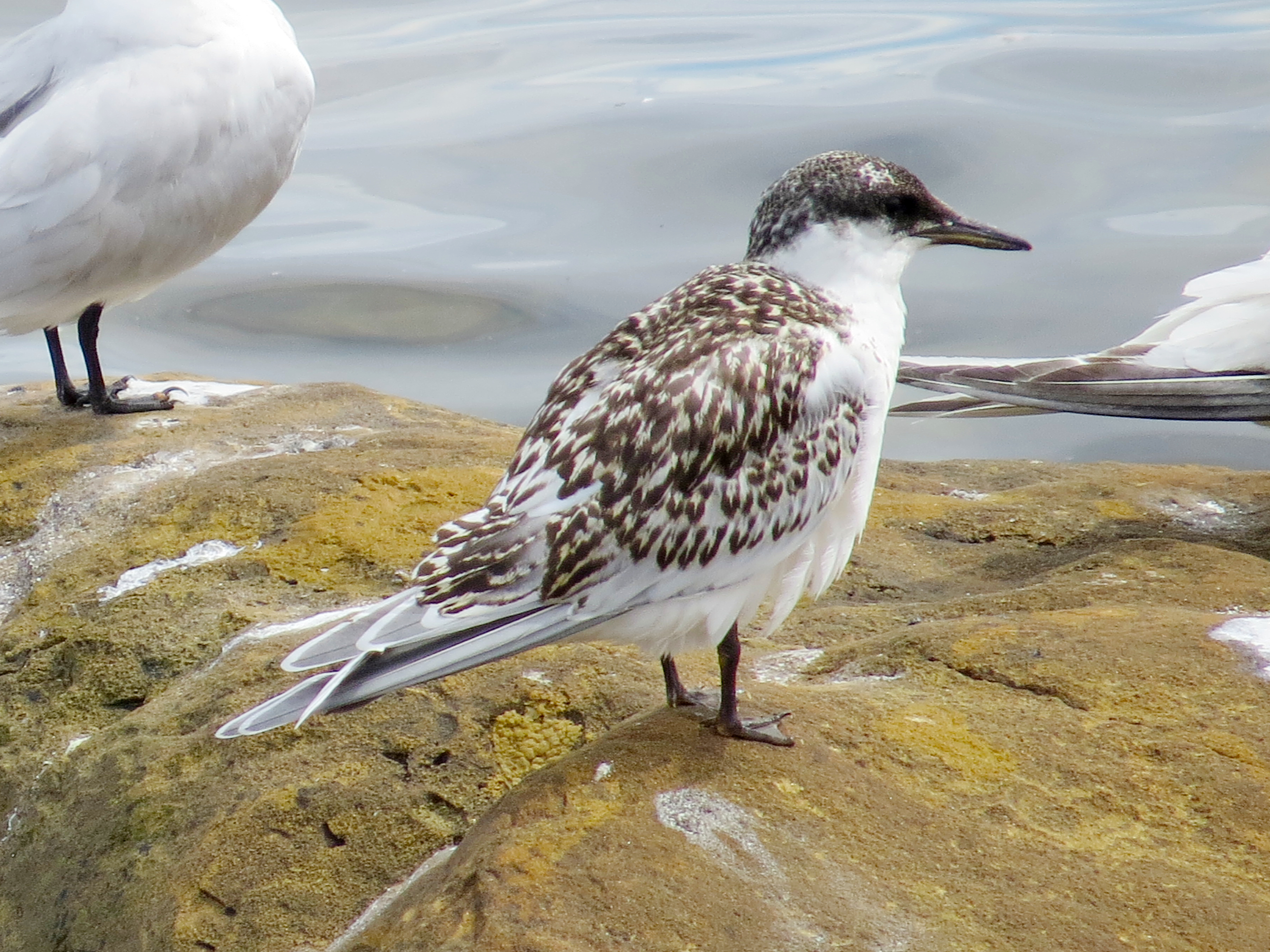
Juvenile plumage, Northumberland, UK

Calls of adults and young, Norfolk, England

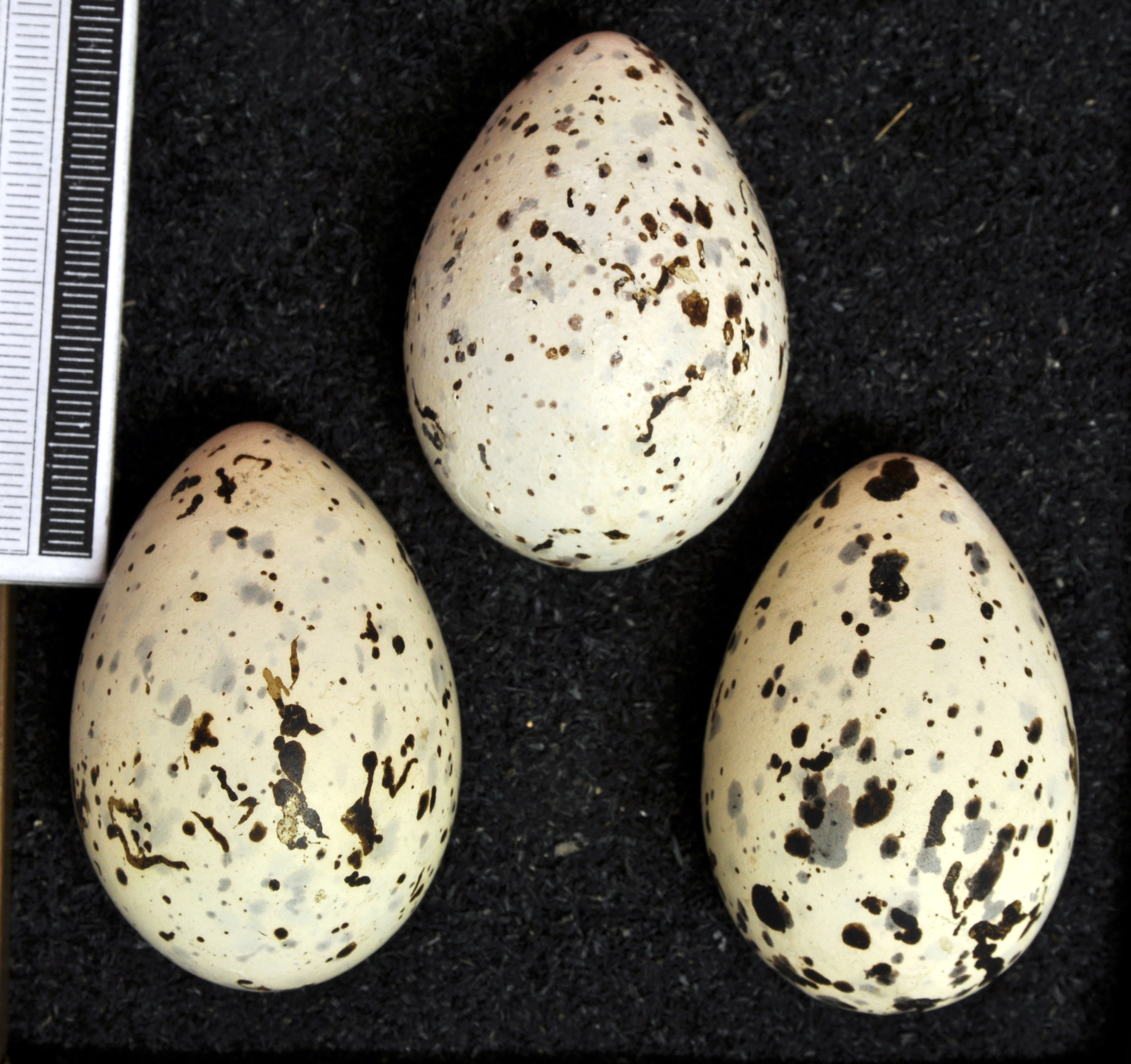
Eggs, Collection Museum Wiesbaden

This is a medium-large tern, 36–41 cm (14–16 in) long with an 95–105 cm (37–41 in) wingspan, which is unlikely to be confused within most of its range. The weight ranges from 200–300 g; males average slightly heavier than females, but with much overlap.

The thin, sharp bill is black with a yellow tip. Its short legs are black. Its upper wings are pale grey and its underparts white, and this tern looks very pale in flight, although the primary flight feathers darken during the summer. In autumn and winter, the adult's forehead becomes extensively white after the post-breeding moult in late summer (July-August); the black forehead is regained in the spring moult in February to March. Juvenile Sandwich terns have dark tips to their tails, an all-blackish bill (lacking the yellow tip, but sometimes yellowish at the base) and a scaly appearance on their back and wings, like juvenile roseate terns but with less black on the crown.

Cabot's tern is the most similar species to Sandwich tern, sharing the black bill with a yellow tip, but differs structurally, with the bill being obviously stouter, and also differs in moult timing, losing its black forehead earlier in the summer. The primary feathers also differ, with Sandwich tern having a broad white margin on the inner web, grey on Cabot's; this white fringe wears off through the summer, giving Sandwich tern primaries a distinctive 'hook tip' in late summer, while Cabot's primaries remain symmetrical as the grey web is more resistant to wear. Its juveniles also generally lack the scaly pattern of Sandwich tern, being a plainer grey (though this can be confused with first-winter plumage of Sandwich tern). The lesser crested tern and elegant tern differ in having all-orange bills; lesser crested also differs in having a grey rump and marginally stouter bill, and elegant in having a slightly longer, more slender bill. The Chinese crested tern is also similar to Sandwich tern, but has a reversal of the bill colour, yellow with a black tip; it does not overlap in range with the Sandwich tern so confusion is unlikely.

The Sandwich tern is very vocal; its call is a characteristic loud grating kear-ik or kerr ink.

== Behaviour ==
This species breeds in very dense colonies on coasts and islands, and exceptionally inland on suitable large freshwater lakes close to the coast. It nests in a ground scrape and lays one or two (rarely three) eggs. Unlike some of the smaller white terns, it is not very aggressive toward potential predators, relying on the sheer density of the nests, often only 20–30 cm (7.9–11.8 in) apart, and nesting close to other more aggressive species such as Arctic terns and black-headed gulls to avoid predation.

Like all Thalasseus terns, the Sandwich tern feeds by plunge-diving for fish, almost invariably from the sea. It usually dives directly, and not from the "stepped-hover" favoured by Arctic terns. The offering of fish by the male to the female is part of the courtship display.

=== Migration ===
Sandwich tern is a long-distance migrant. Different breeding populations migrate to different wintering areas; those breeding in Great Britain migrate to the west coast of Africa from Senegal south to South Africa (a distance of over 10,000 km), while those breeding on the Caspian Sea coasts migrate to the Indian Subcontinent, south to Sri Lanka.

== Status ==
The Sandwich tern has an extensive global range estimated at 100,000–1,000,000 km^{2} (39,000–386,000 sq mi). It has a population estimated at 460,000–500,000 individuals. Population trends have not been quantified, but the species is not believed to approach the thresholds for the population decline criterion of the IUCN Red List (i.e. declining more than 30% in ten years or three generations). For these reasons the species is evaluated as least concern.

The Sandwich tern is among the taxa to which the Agreement on the Conservation of African-Eurasian Migratory Waterbirds (AEWA) applies. Parties to the agreement are required to engage in a wide range of conservation actions, which are describes in a detailed action plan. This plan should address key issues such as species and habitat conservation, management of human activities, research, education, and implementation.

Their habit of breeding in very dense colonies made them highly vulnerable to the 2021–2023 highly pathogenic avian influenza (HPAI) outbreaks, with mass mortality in numerous colonies in northwestern Europe in 2022. Older birds were more likely to die from avian influenza; this loss of the more experienced birds is likely to lead to depressed breeding productivity in the future, which could become a serious problem if outbreaks continue to occur.

== Gallery ==
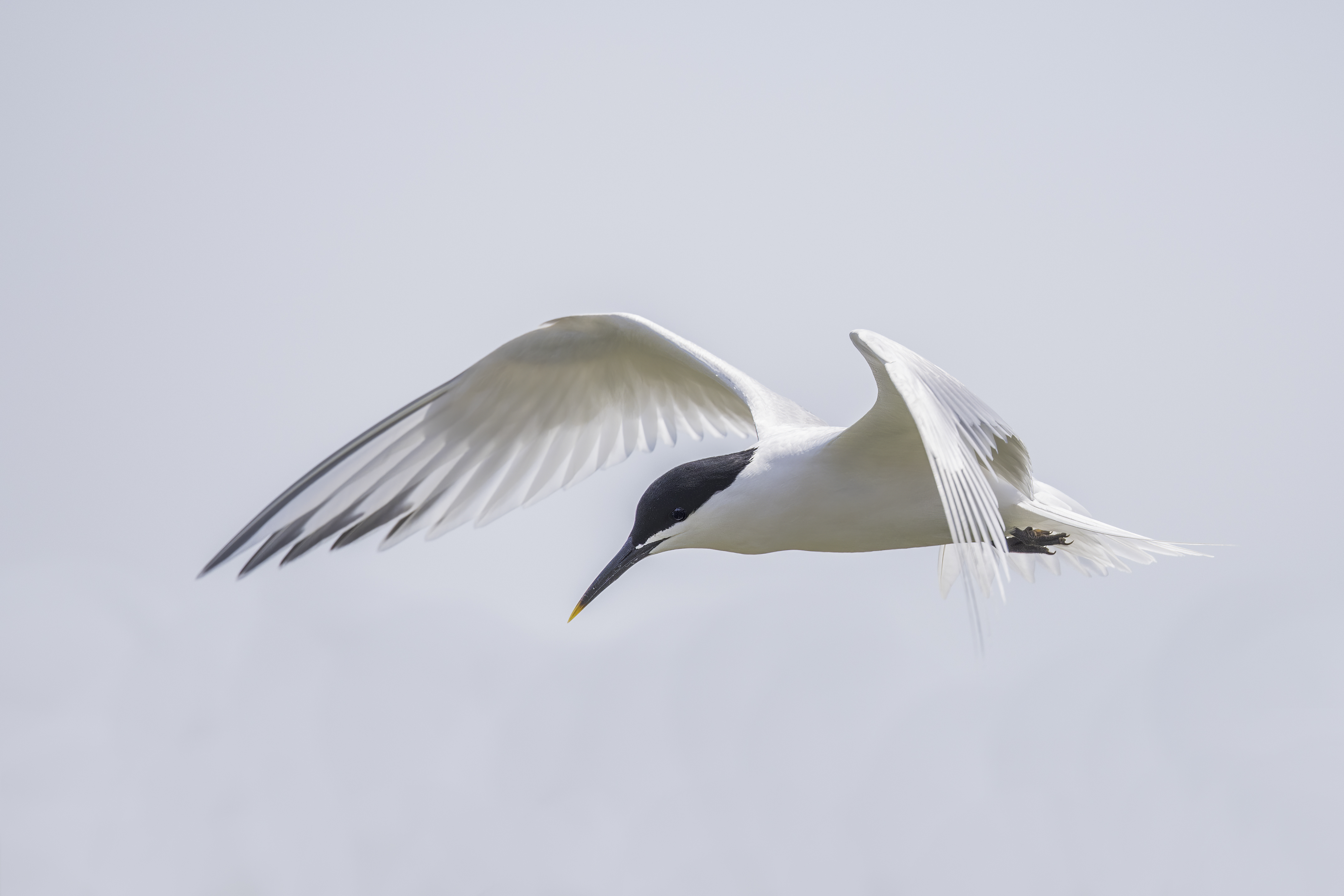
Sandwich tern in flight, Dorset, UK

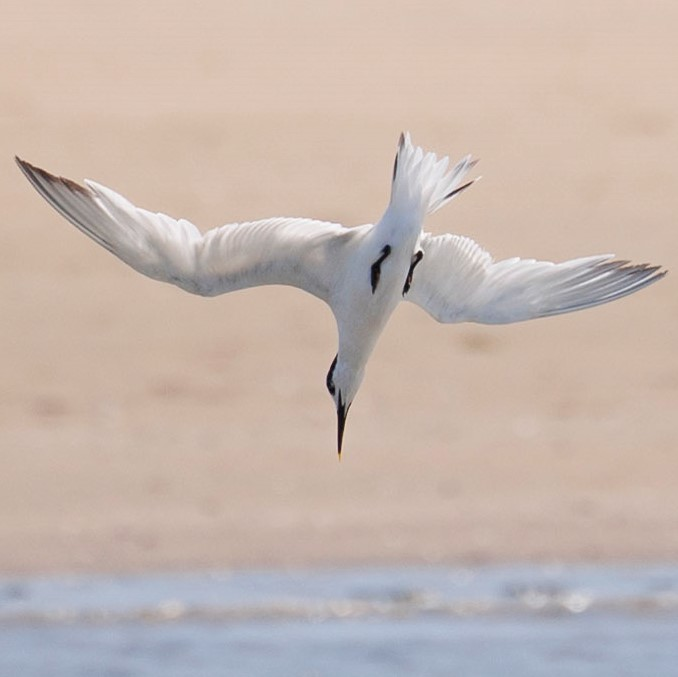
Plunge-diving Sandwich tern

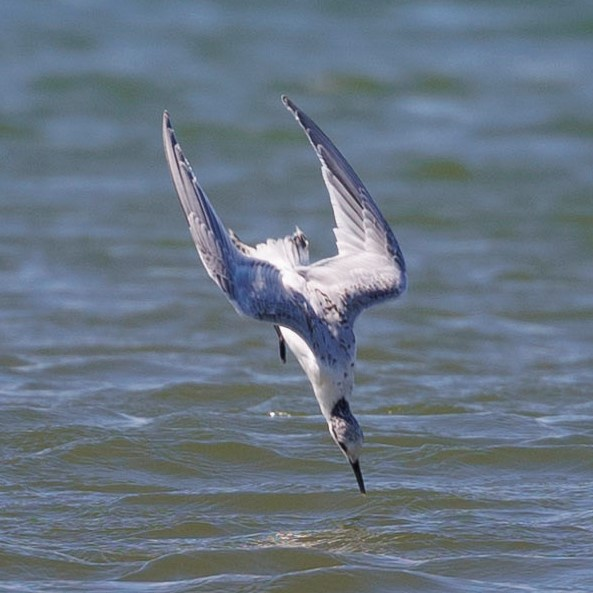
Plunge-diving Sandwich tern

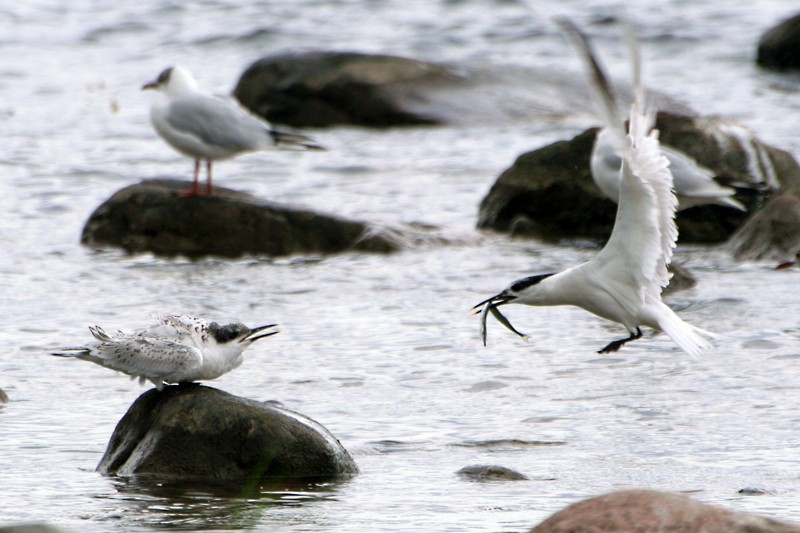
Sandwich tern approaching its waiting offspring with a fish

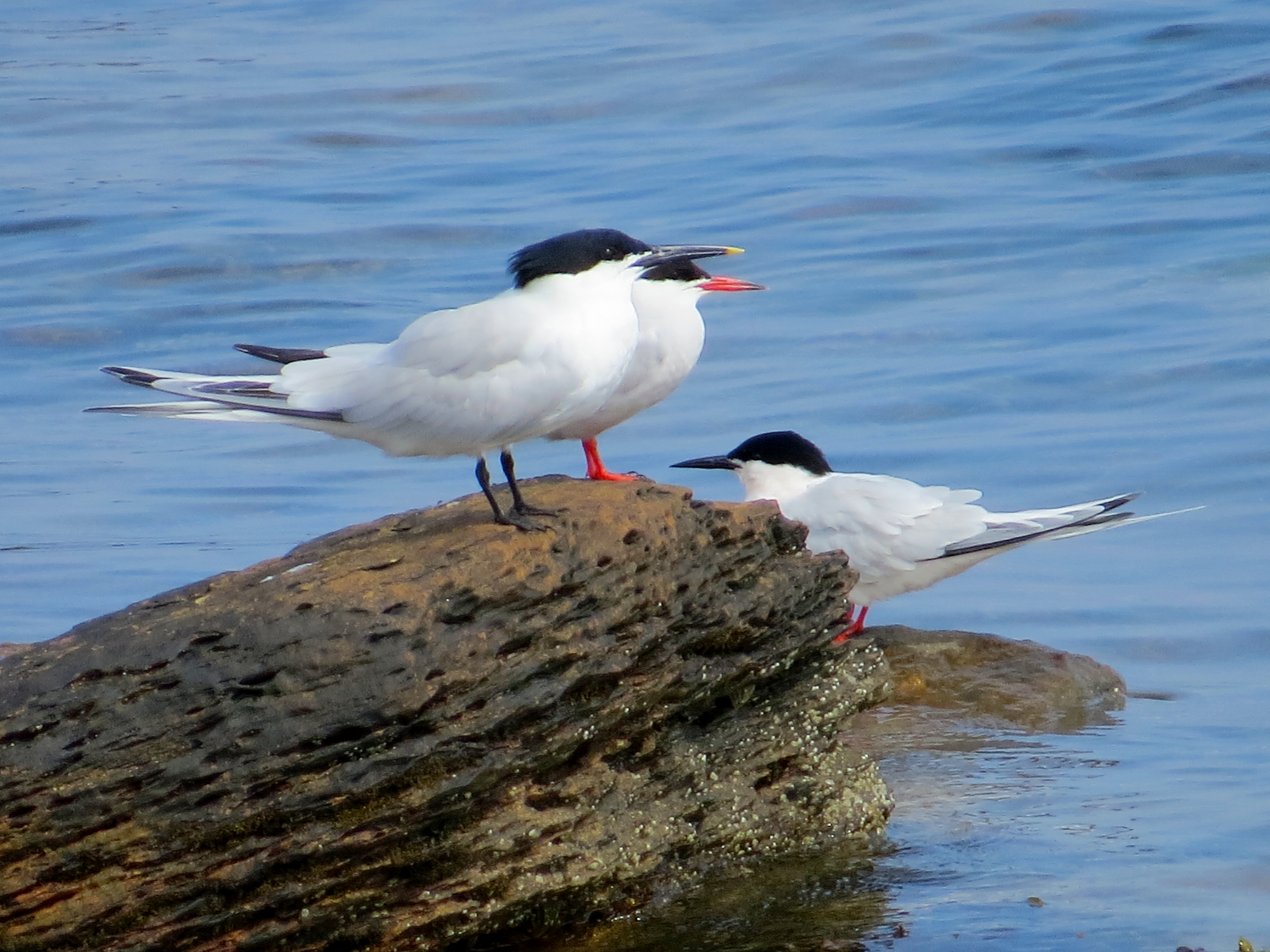
Sandwich tern (left) with a common tern (centre) and a roseate tern (right)

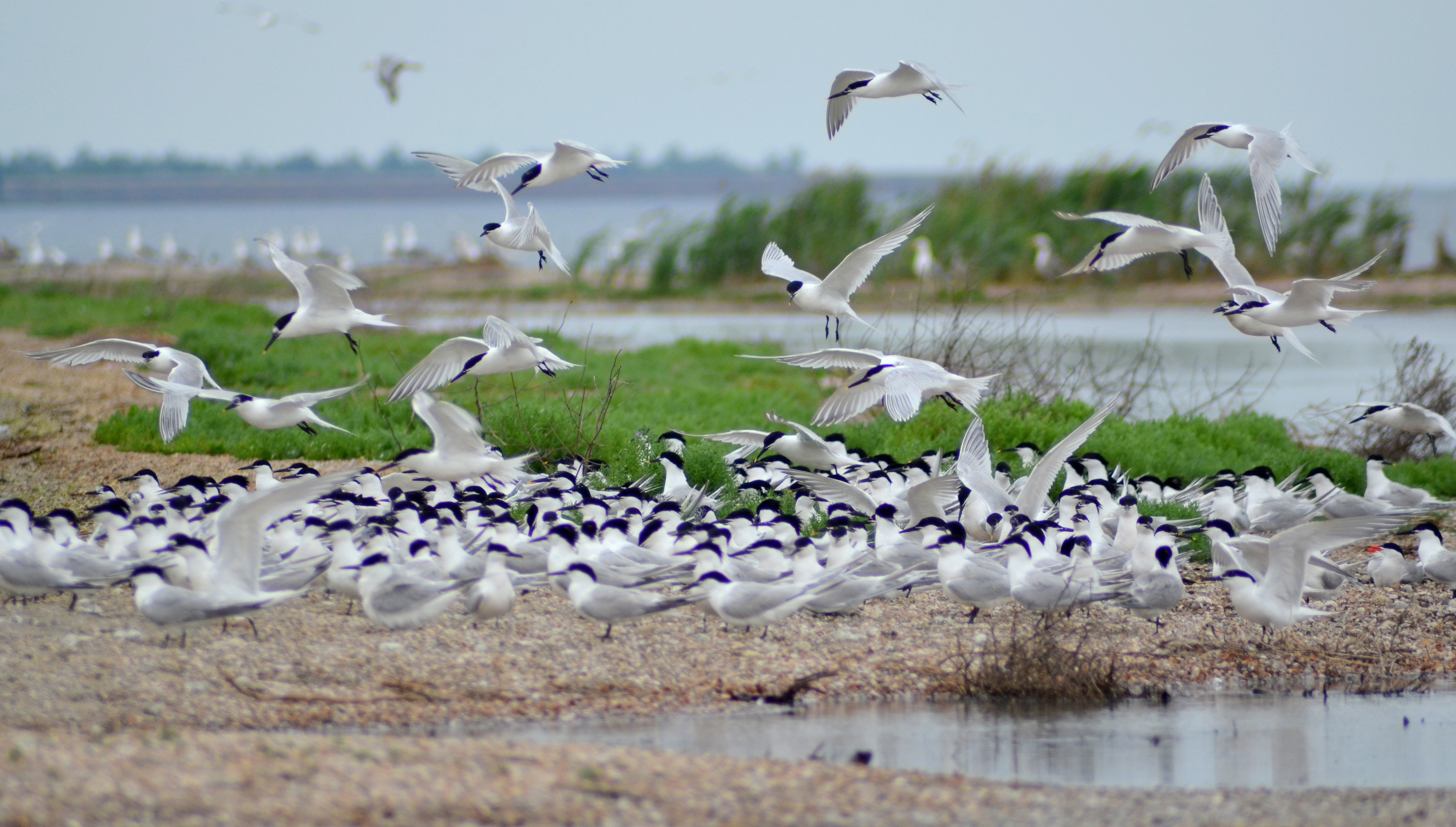
Breeding colony in Tuzly Lagoons National Nature Park, Ukraine

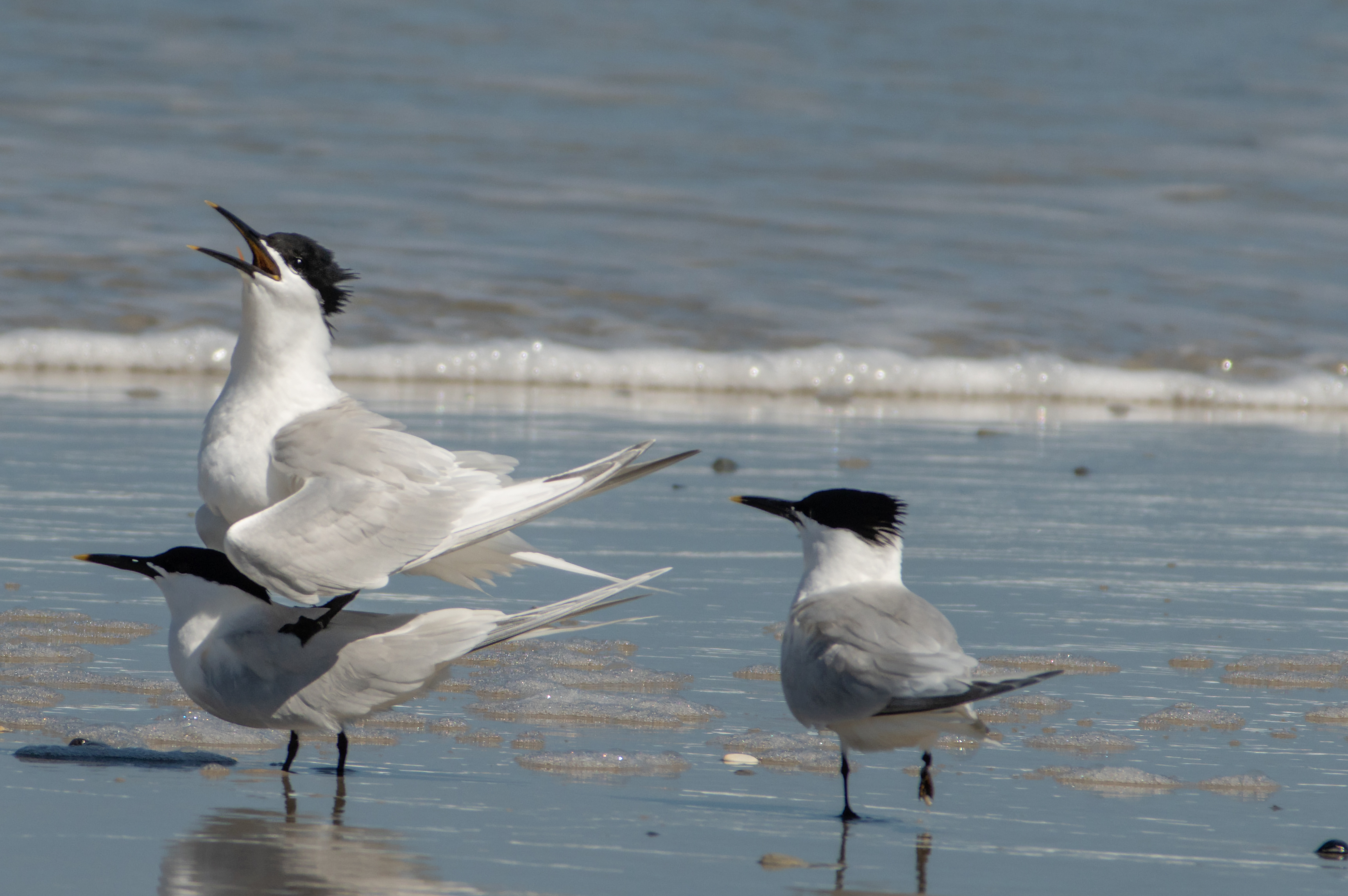
Sandwich terns on Düne, Heligoland

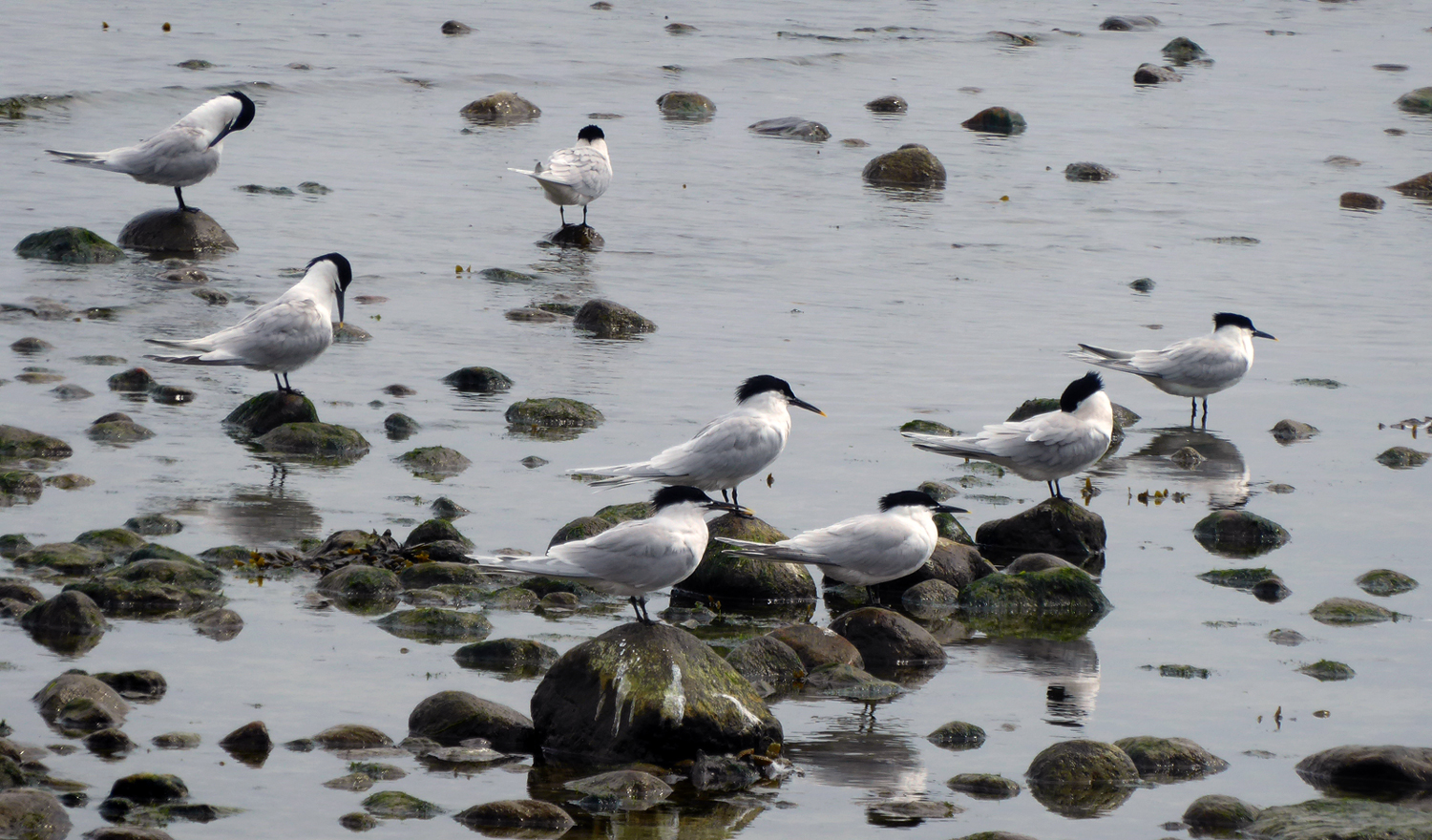
Sandwich terns resting in Sweden.
