= Mahala Lagoon =

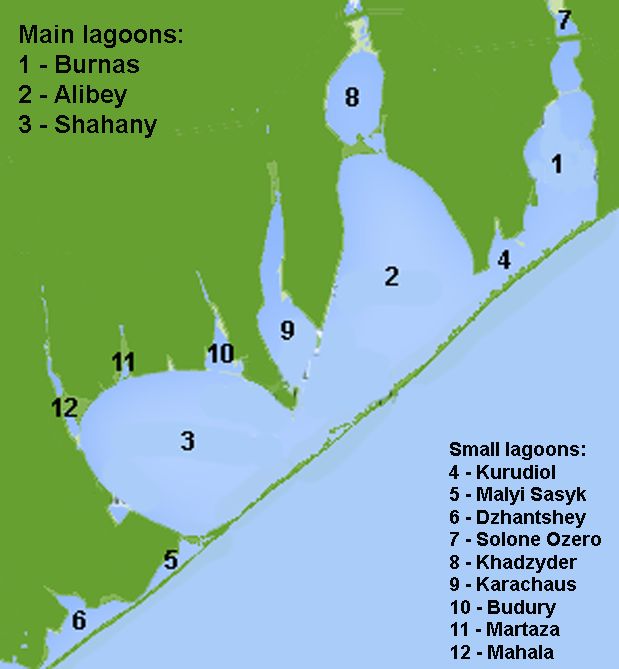
- The Mahala Lagoon on the schematic map of the Tuzly Lagoons (#12)

- Location within Odesa Oblast
- Location: Black Sea
- Coordinates: 45°43′48.3″N 29°47′37.1″E
- Ocean/sea sources: Atlantic Ocean
- Basin countries: Ukraine
- Surface area: 0.76 km^{2} (0.29 sq mi)
- Settlements: Tryhatky

Mahala Lagoon (Ukrainian: Магала, Магалевське озеро; Romanian: Lacul Mahala) is a small salty lagoon in the Tuzly Lagoons group, Ukraine. The total area is 76 ha. It is located west of the Shahany Lagoon, near the village of Trykhatky, Bilhorod-Dnistrovskyi Raion of Odesa Oblast. From the Shahany Lagoon it is separated by a sandbar.

The name of the lagoon originates from Arabic mähallä, from the root meaning "to settle", "to occupy".

== Sources ==
- Starushenko L.I., Bushuyev S.G. (2001) Prichernomorskiye limany Odeschiny i ih rybohoziaystvennoye znacheniye. Astroprint, Odesa, 151 pp. (in Russian)
