= Budury Lagoon =

Body of water in Ukraine

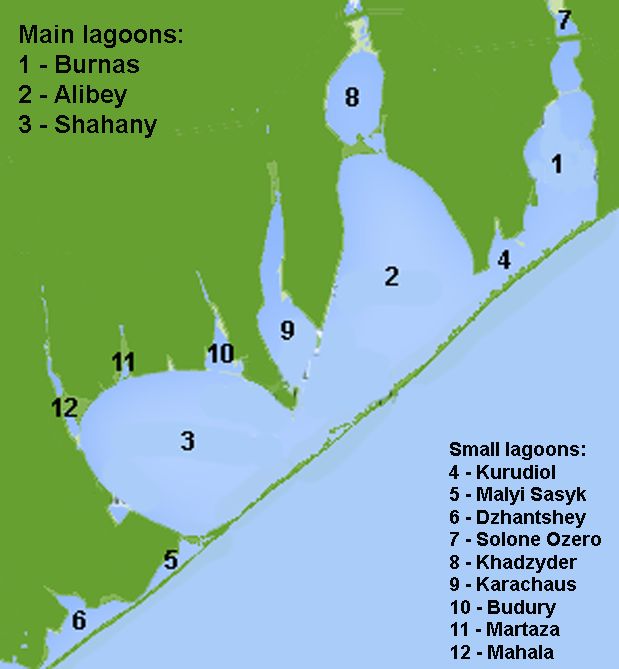
- The Budury Lagoon on the schematic map of the Tuzly Lagoons (#10)

- Location within Ukraine
- Location: Black Sea
- Coordinates: 45°45′35.4″N 29°53′34.6″E
- Ocean/sea sources: Atlantic Ocean
- Basin countries: Ukraine

Budury Lagoon (Ukrainian: Будури; Romanian: Buduri) is a small salty lagoon in the Tuzly Lagoons group in Bilhorod-Dnistrovskyi Raion of Odesa Oblast, Ukraine. It is located north from the Shahany Lagoon. It is separated from the Shahany Lagoon by the sandbar.

Named after the old name of the village of Kochkuvate (old name - Budury).

The water body is included to the Tuzly Lagoons National Nature Park.

== Sources ==
- Starushenko L.I., Bushuyev S.G. (2001) Prichernomorskiye limany Odeschiny i ih rybohoziaystvennoye znacheniye. Astroprint, Odesa, 151 pp. (in Russian)
