= Rosieika =

Health-spa zone in Odesa Oblast, Ukraine

Coordinates: 45.652778°N 29.838056°E

Rosieika (Ukrainian: Росєйка; Russian: Рассейка, romanized: Rasseyka) is a health-spa zone within the territory of Prymorske, Odesa Oblast, Ukraine.

== Resorts ==
More than 50 guest-houses are located within the territory of Rosieika. The resort is connected to the shore of the Black Sea by wooden bridges across the lake.
