= Karachaus Lagoon =

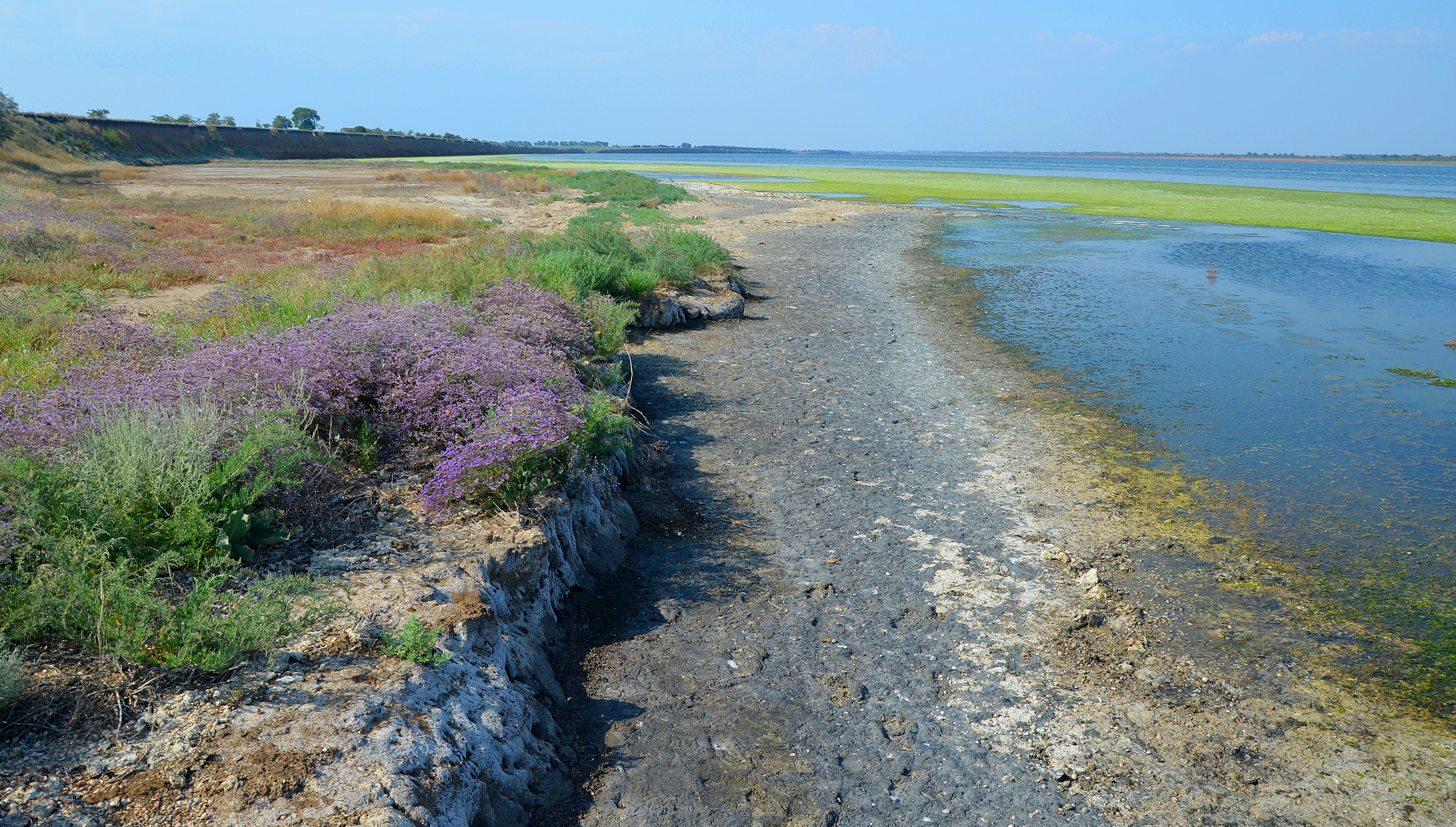

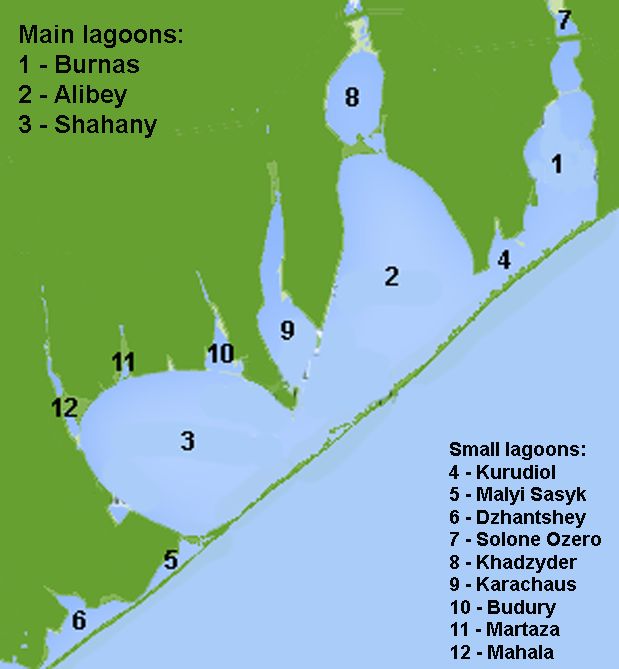
- The Karachaus Lagoon on the schematic map of the Tuzly Lagoons (#9)

- Location within Odesa Oblast
- Location: Black Sea
- Coordinates: 45°46′20.7″N 29°56′00.6″E
- River sources: Hlyboka River
- Ocean/sea sources: Atlantic Ocean
- Basin countries: Ukraine
- Surface area: 7.6 km^{2} (2.9 sq mi)

Karachaus Lagoon (Ukrainian: Карачаус; Romanian: Caraceauş) is a salty lagoon in the Tuzly Lagoons group in Bilhorod-Dnistrovskyi Raion of Odesa Oblast, Ukraine. It was a part of the Alibey Lagoon in past, locating in its south-west part, near the village of Roylianka. Now it is separated from the Alibey Lagoon by the sandbar. The total area of the lagoon - 7.6 km^{2}.

The water body is included to the Tuzly Lagoons National Nature Park.

== Sources ==
- Starushenko L.I., Bushuyev S.G. (2001) Prichernomorskiye limany Odeschiny i ih rybohoziaystvennoye znacheniye. Astroprint, Odesa, 151 pp. (in Russian)
