= Solone Ozero =

Lagoon in Ukraine

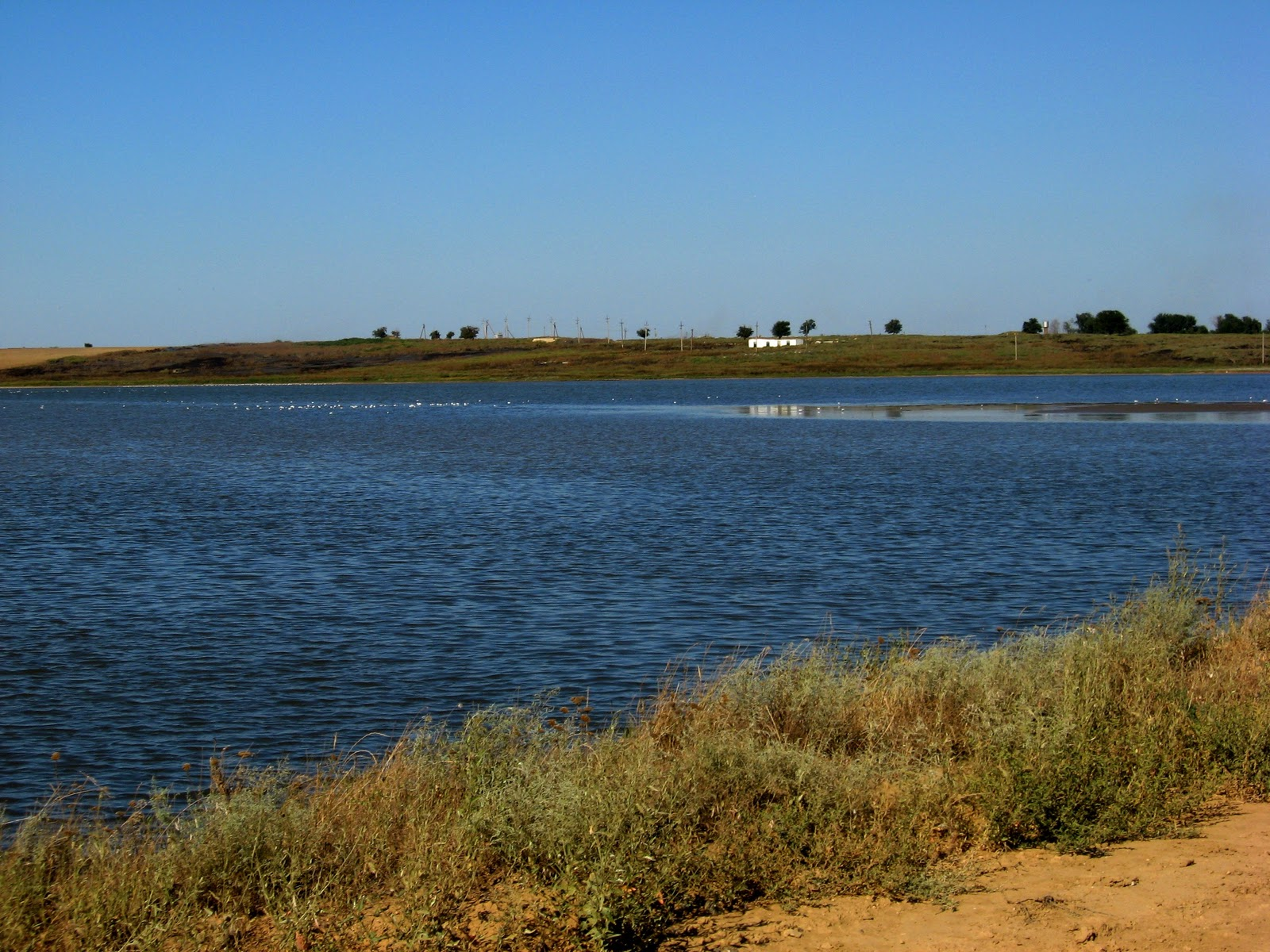

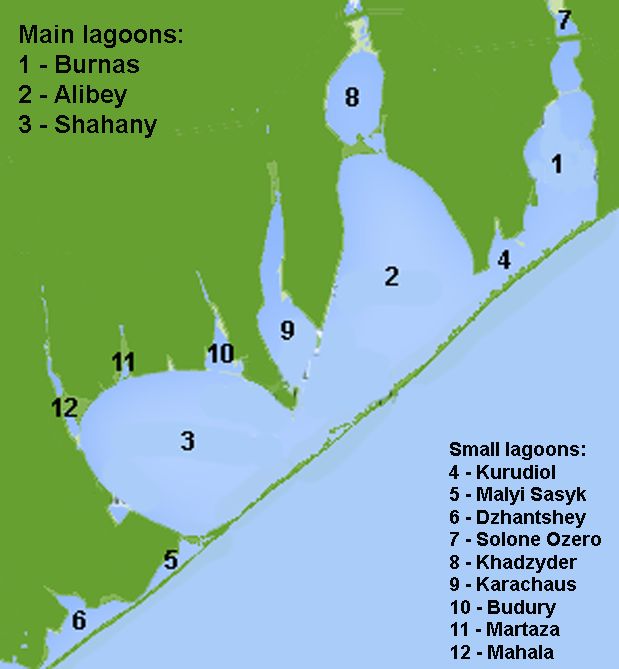
- The Solone Ozero Lagoon on the schematic map of the Tuzly Lagoons (#7)

- Location within Odesa Oblast
- Location: Black Sea
- Coordinates: 45°53′N 30°07′E
- River sources: Alkaliya River
- Ocean/sea sources: Atlantic Ocean
- Basin countries: Ukraine

Solone Ozero (Ukrainian: Солоне озеро; Romanian: Lacul Sărat) is a small salty lagoon (or liman), which used to be a part of the Burnas Lagoon. Now it is separated from the Burnas Lagoon by the autoroute. The Alkaliya River inflows to the lagoon. The water body is included to the Tuzly Lagoons National Nature Park.
