= Khadzhyder Lagoon =

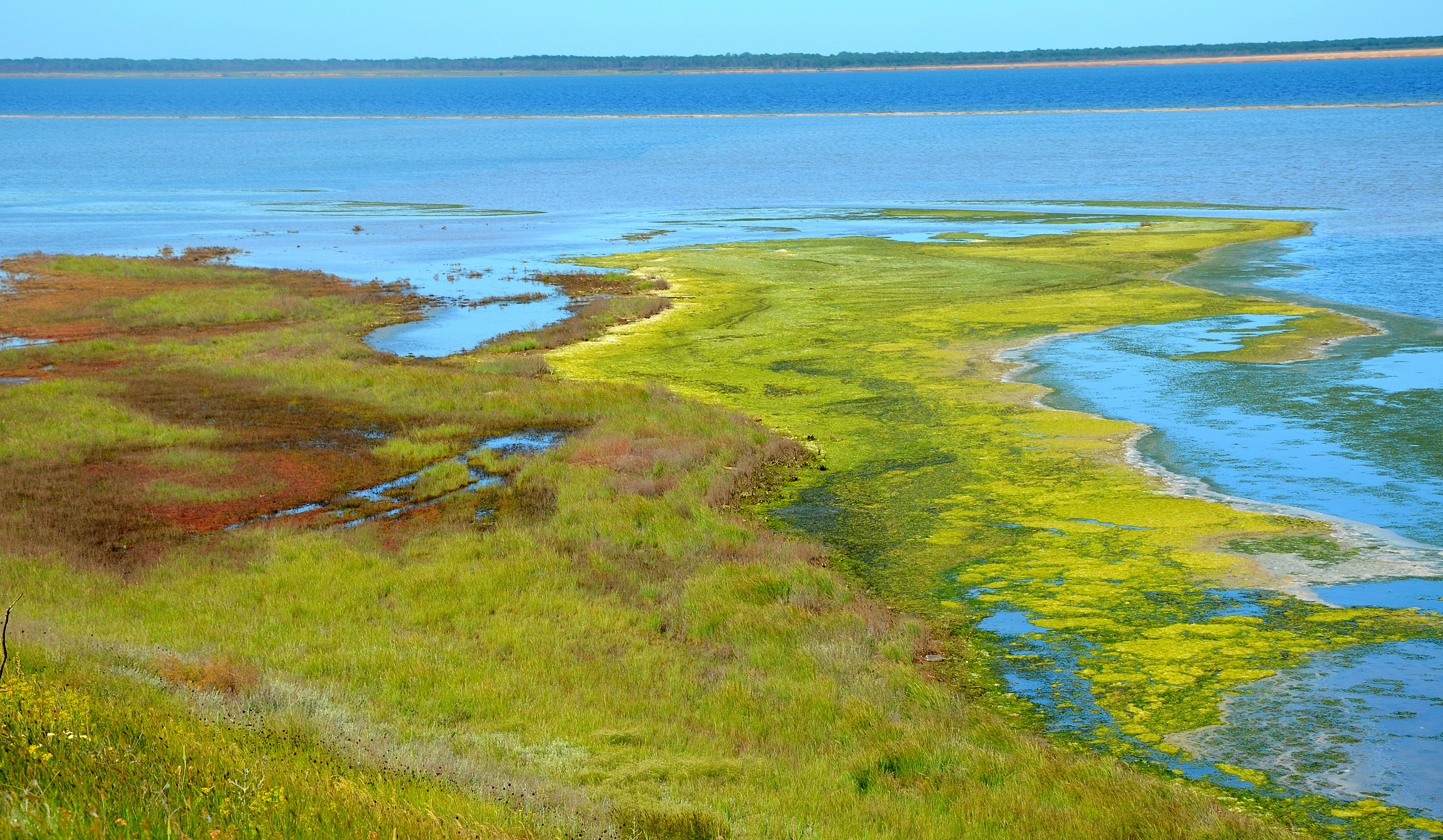

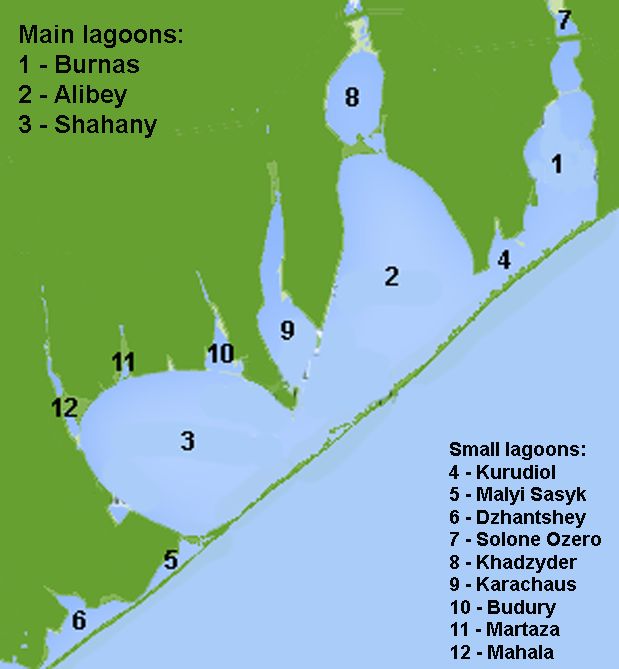
- The Kurudiol Lagoon on the schematic map of the Tuzly Lagoons (#8)

- Location within Odesa Oblast
- Location: Black Sea
- Coordinates: 45°52′N 29°58′E
- River sources: Khadzhyder River, Hlyboka River
- Ocean/sea sources: Atlantic Ocean
- Basin countries: Ukraine
- Max. length: 4 km (2.5 mi)
- Max. width: 2.5 km (1.6 mi)

Khadzhyder Lagoon (Ukrainian: Хаджидер; Romanian: Lacul Hagider) is a salty lagoon in the Tuzly Lagoons group in Bilhorod-Dnistrovskyi Raion of Odesa Oblast, Ukraine. It is separated from the Alibey by a sandbar. Two river, Khadzhyder River and Hlyboka River, inflow into the lagoon. The last one inflows west to the village Bezymyanka, it has a length 24 km, watershed area 80.3 km^{2}. The lagoon has a 4 km length and 2.5 km width. Two villages, Lyman and Bezymyanka, are located on the coast of the lagoon.

The lagoon was a part of the Alibey Lagoon in historical period, and appeared as a result of separation of the Khadzhyder River mouth by a sandbar. Several kurhans of Catacomb culture are located near the village of Lyman.

The water body is included to the Tuzly Lagoons National Nature Park.

== Etymology ==
The hydronym means the valley of Hajj.

- Hajj (Turkish: honorific title given to a Muslim person who has successfully completed the Hajj to Mecca), Hajj (Arabic: حج) is an Islamic pilgrimage.
- Dere (Tatar: valley)

The name of the lagoon Khadzhyder on the historical maps:

- 1877 — Romanian: L. Hadji Der.
