= Burnas Lagoon =

Marine lagoon in Ukraine

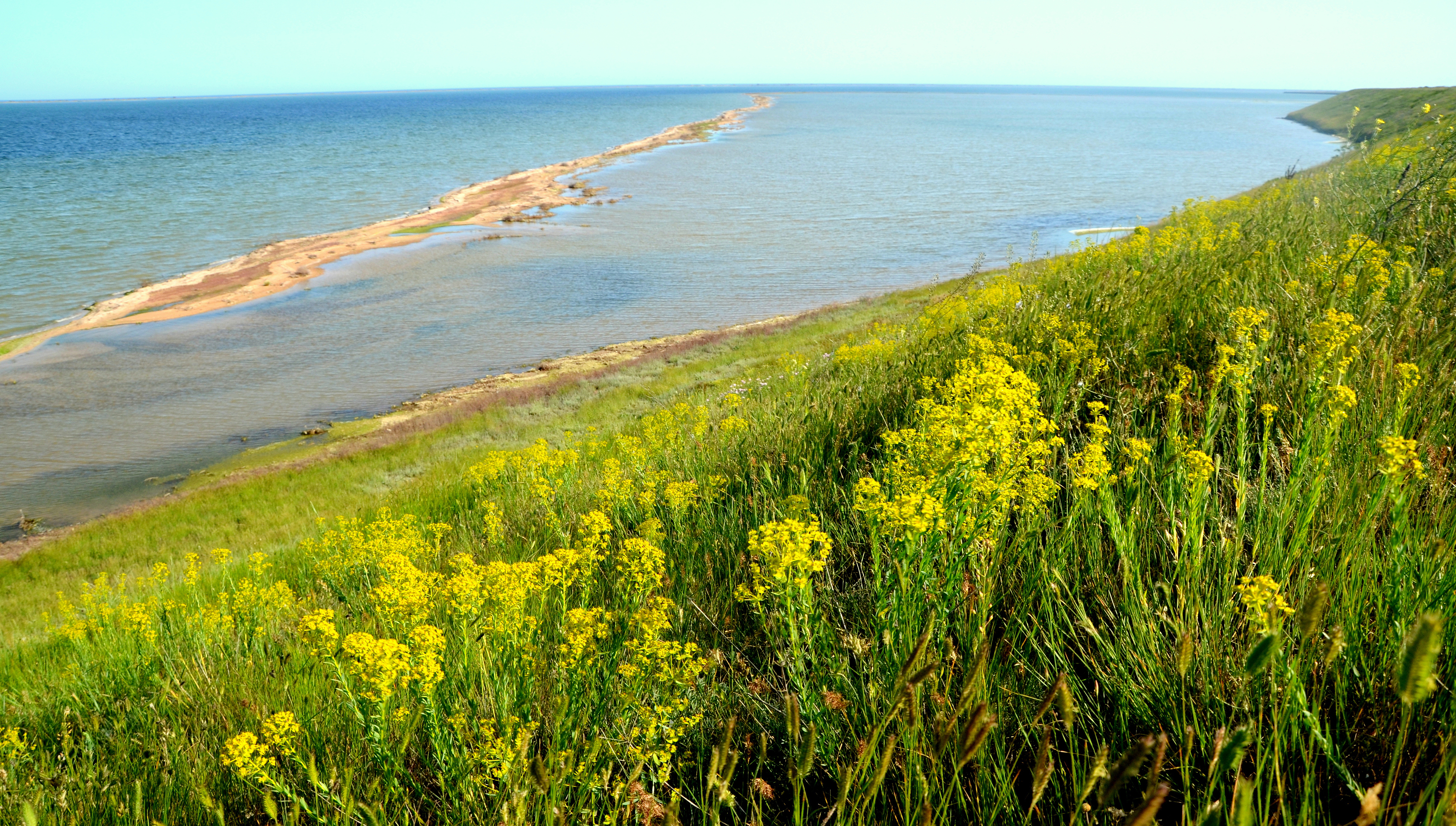
- The coast of the Burnas Lagoon near the village of Tuzly

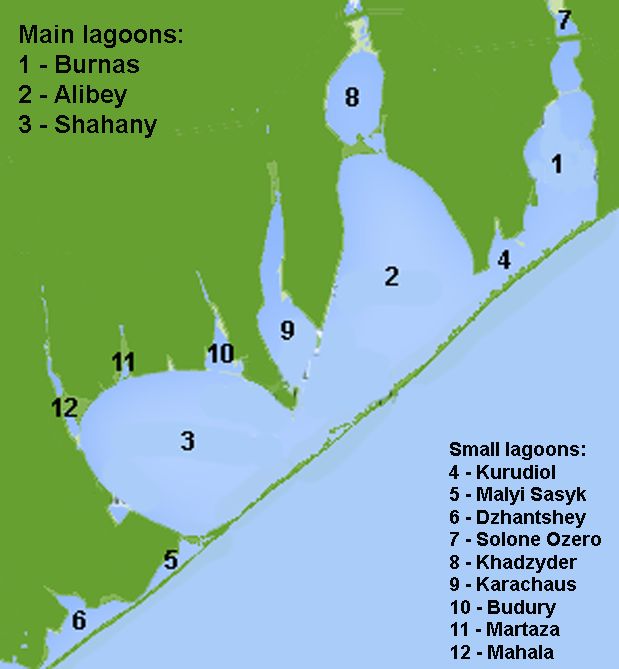
- The Burnas Lagoon on the schematic map of the Tuzly Lagoons (#1)
- Location: Odesa Oblast, Ukraine
- Coordinates: 45°50′N 30°07′E
- River sources: Alkaliya River
- Ocean/sea sources: Black Sea
- Basin countries: Ukraine
- Max. length: 9.6 km (6.0 mi)
- Max. width: 3.2 km (2.0 mi)
- Surface area: 26.9 km^{2} (10.4 sq mi)
- Average depth: 1 m (3.3 ft)
- Max. depth: 1.5 m (4.9 ft)
- Water volume: 31.9×10^{6} m^{3} (41,700,000 cu yd)
- Salinity: ~30%
- Shore length^{1}: 649 km^{2} (251 sq mi) basin
- Settlements: Lebedivka, Tuzly, Bazarianka
- ^{1} Shore length is not a well-defined measure.

Burnas Lagoon (Ukrainian: Бурнас; Romanian: Limanul Burnas) is a marine lagoon (or liman) in southern Ukraine, located in Bilhorod-Dnistrovskyi Raion of Odesa Oblast. The lagoon is part of the Tuzly Lagoons group.

== Etymology ==
The name "Burnas" is considered by linguists to be likely of Cuman origin, sharing its etymology with the Burnazului Plain in the historical region of Muntenia (Wallachia).

== Geography ==
The lagoon has an elongated basin with steep banks, except for its southern part. It covers an area of 26.9 km², with a length of 9.6 km and a maximum width of 3.2 km. The maximum depth is 1.5 m, with an average depth of 1 m. In the north, the Burnas Lagoon is connected to the Solone Ozero lagoon, and to the northwest, it connects to the Kurudiol Lagoon, which in turn links it to the Alibey Lagoon in the west.

== Hydrology ==
The lagoon is separated from the Black Sea by a narrow, oblique sandbar, which is breached by a channel that allows for water exchange. The primary source of freshwater is the Alkaliya River. Due to continuous water exchange with the sea and high rates of evaporation, the lagoon's salinity is approximately twice that of the Black Sea, at around 30%.

== Ecology ==
Located in the Danube floodplain near the Danube Delta, the Burnas Lagoon supports rich aquatic vegetation. The shores of the lagoon are an important nesting site for numerous species of birds, which use the area for reproduction and molting.

== Protected status ==
The Burnas Lagoon is part of the Shagany-Alibei-Burnas system of lagoons, which has been designated as a Wetland of International Importance under the Ramsar Convention. The protected area covers 190 km² and is included within the Tuzly Lagoans National Natural Park.

== Economy ==
The peloid (therapeutic mud) health spa of Lebedivka is located on the northern coast of the Burnas Lagoon.
