= Alibey Lagoon =

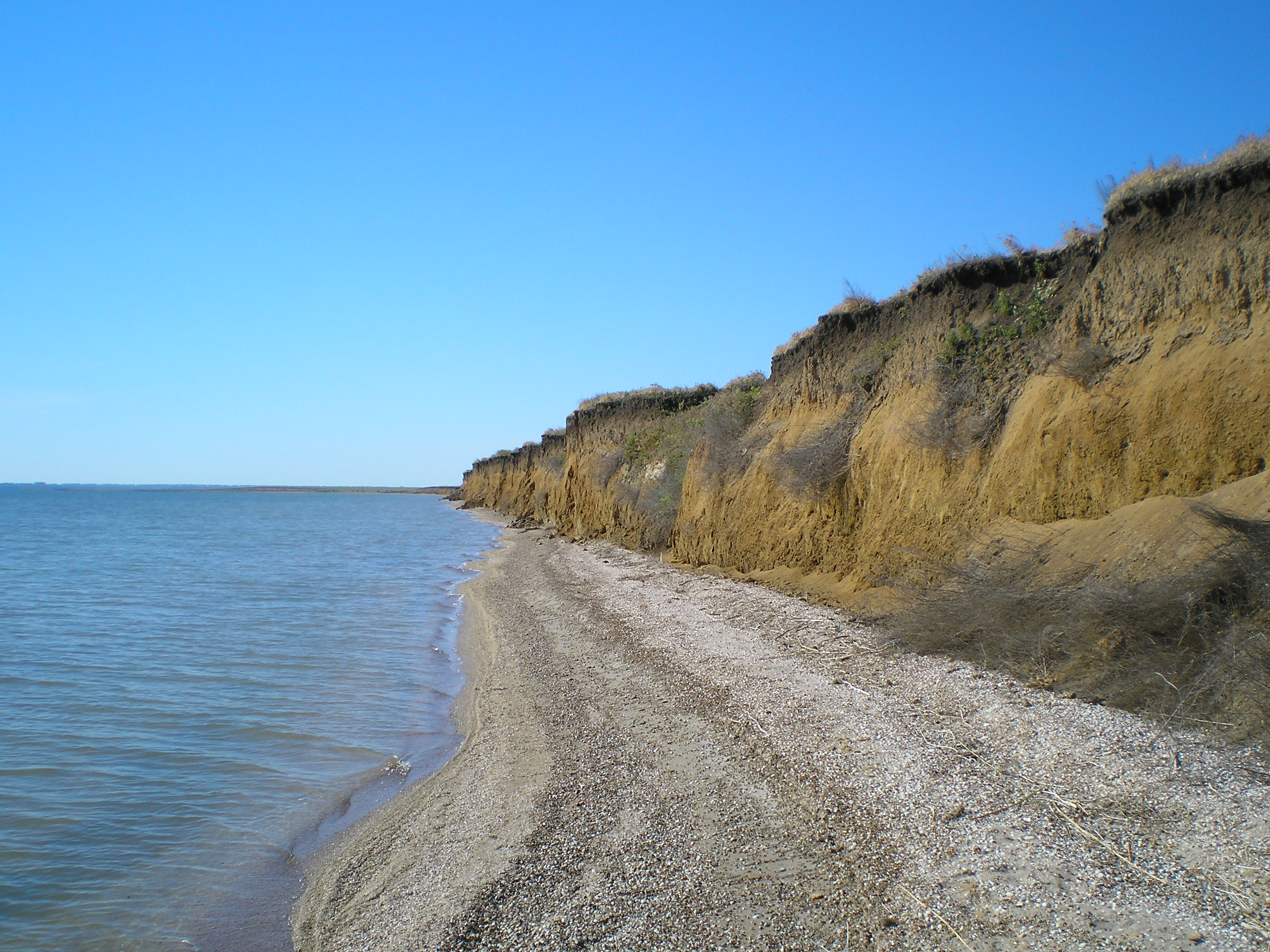
- Cliffs of the Alibey Lagoon

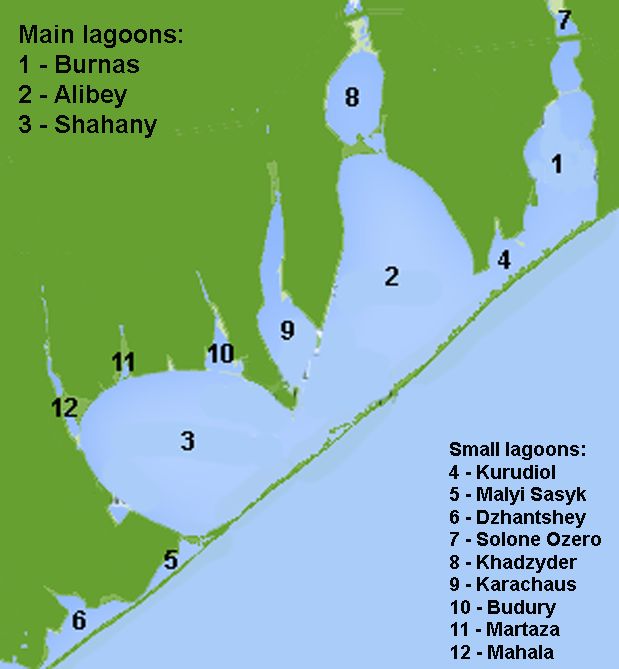
- The Alibey Lagoon on the schematic map of the Tuzly Lagoons (#2)

- Location within Ukraine
- Location: Black Sea
- Coordinates: 45°47′N 30°00′E
- Ocean/sea sources: Atlantic Ocean
- Basin countries: Ukraine
- Max. length: 15 km (9.3 mi)
- Max. width: 11 km (6.8 mi)
- Surface area: 72 km^{2} (28 sq mi)
- Max. depth: 2.5 m (8.2 ft)
- Salinity: ~30 ‰

Alibey Lagoon (Ukrainian: Алібей; Romanian: Limanul Alibei; Turkish: Alibey Gölü) is a salty lagoon (liman) on the Black Sea coast of Bilhorod-Dnistrovskyi Raion of Odesa Oblast, Ukraine. The lagoon is originated from the old mouth of the Khadzhyder River. The length of the lagoon is 15 km, width 11 km, area 72 km^{2}. The depth is 2.5 m.

The lagoon is separated from the sea by sandbar. It is connected through the Kurudiol Lagoon with the Burnas Lagoon on the south east, with the Karachaus Lagoon and Shahany Lagoon on the south west. Earlier, the Khadzhyder River inflowed to the lagoon, but now the river inflows to the Khadzhyder Lagoon, which separated from the Alibey Lagoon by dam.

== Name ==
The name of the lagoon comes from that of 18th-century Turkish military commander Saraskir Hacı-Ali Bey.

== History ==
Between 1840 and 1856, nearly 4 million tons of salt were extracted from the lake. Following the 1856 Treaty of Paris (1856), settled the Crimean War (1853-1856), Russia had to return to Moldova a strip of land from southwest Bessarabia (known as Cahul, Bolgrad and Ismail). As a result of this territorial loss, Russia had no access to the mouths of the Danube, and the exploitation of the salt was stopped.

Following the Treaty of Berlin (1878), Romania was forced to return Southern Bessarabia to Russia. After that, Russians did not resume the salt extraction from the lake.

The site was included as part of the Shagany-Alibei-Burnas Lakes System, which was registered as a Ramsar site in 1997. The area has been used as a Ukrainian military testing ground for the Armed Forces of Ukraine in conducting missile tests. It was used to test the R-360 Neptune coastal missile system and electronic warfare resistance in 2020.

== Sources ==
- Starushenko L.I., Bushuyev S.G. (2001) Prichernomorskiye limany Odeschiny i ih rybohoziaystvennoye znacheniye. Astroprint, Odesa, 151 pp. (in Russian)
- Information Sheet on Ramsar Wetlands — Shagany-Alibei-Burnas Lakes System
