= Shahany Lagoon =

Coordinates: 45°42′N 29°52′E

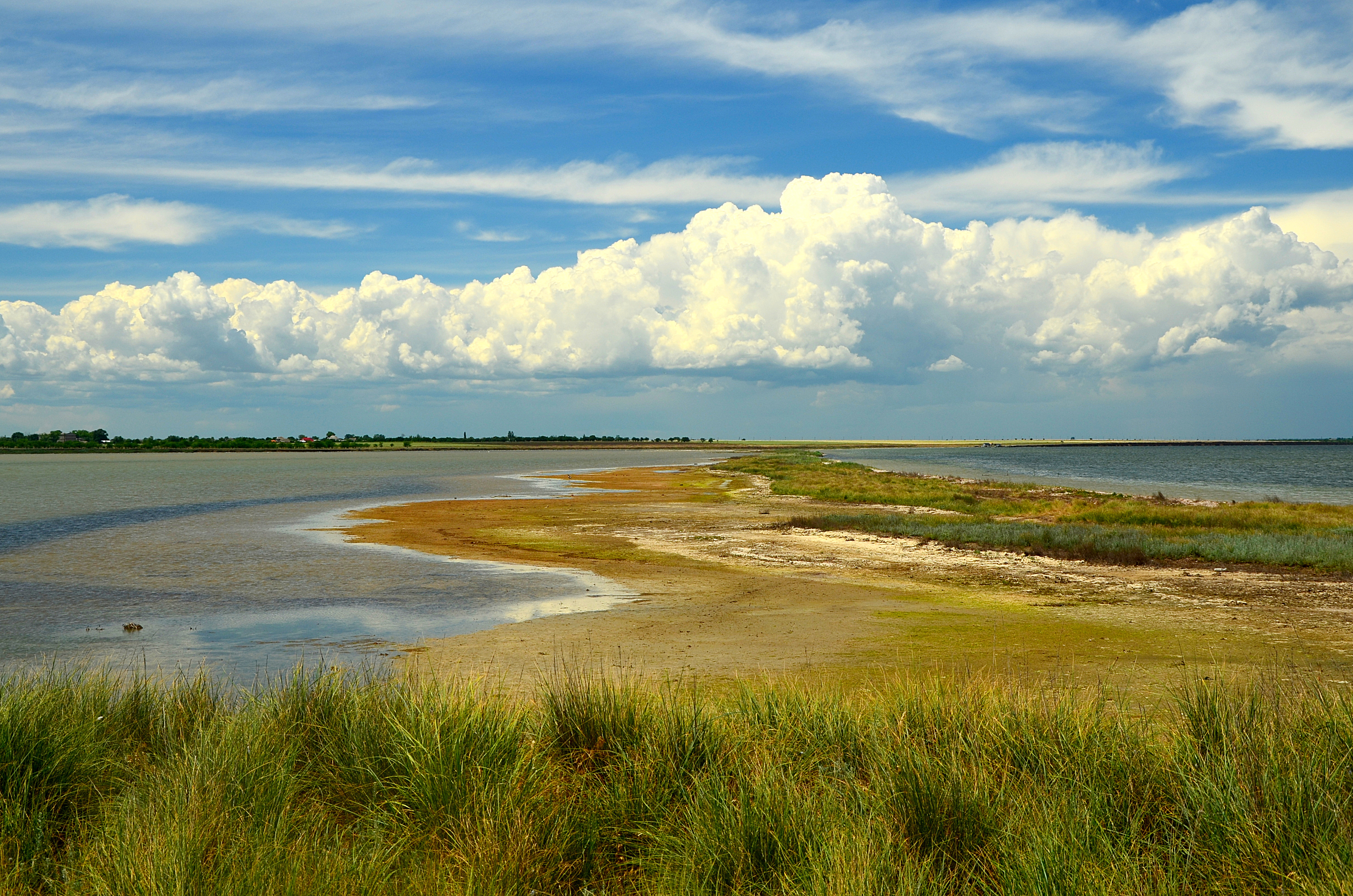
- Coast of the Shahany Lagoon

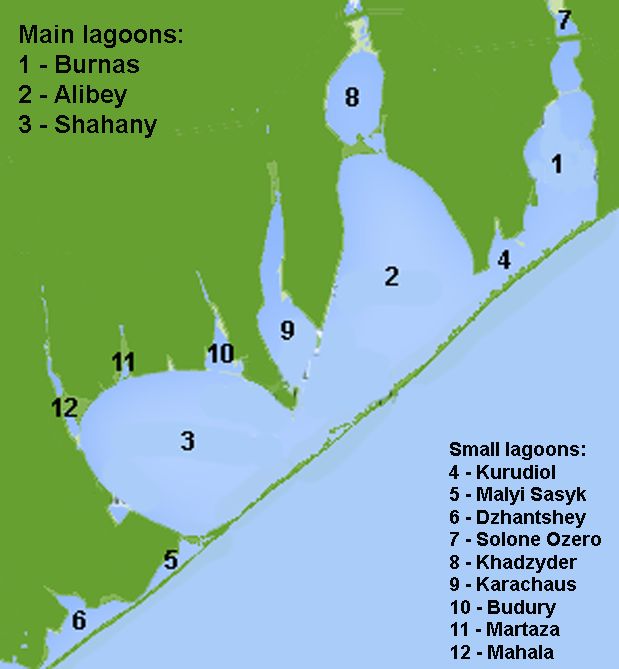
- The Shahany Lagoon on the schematic map of the Tuzly Lagoons (#3)

- Location within Odesa Oblast
- Location: Black Sea
- Ocean/sea sources: Atlantic Ocean
- Basin countries: Ukraine
- Max. length: 9 km (5.6 mi)
- Max. width: 8 km (5.0 mi)
- Surface area: 70 km^{2} (27 sq mi)
- Max. depth: 2.4 m (7.9 ft)
- Salinity: ~30 ‰

Shahany Lagoon (Ukrainian: Шагани; Romanian: Şagani; Turkish: Çagani Gölü) is a salty lagoon on the Black Sea coast of Ukraine in Bilhorod-Dnistrovskyi Raion of Odesa Oblast. The lagoon is in the complex of Tuzly Lagoons, connected with the Alibey Lagoon. The area of the water body is 70 km^{2}, salinity is about 30‰. The lagoon is separated from the Black Sea by a sandbar.
