= Zaliznyi Port =

Resort village in Kherson Oblast, Ukraine

Zaliznyi Port Залізний Порт Железный Порт
- Village
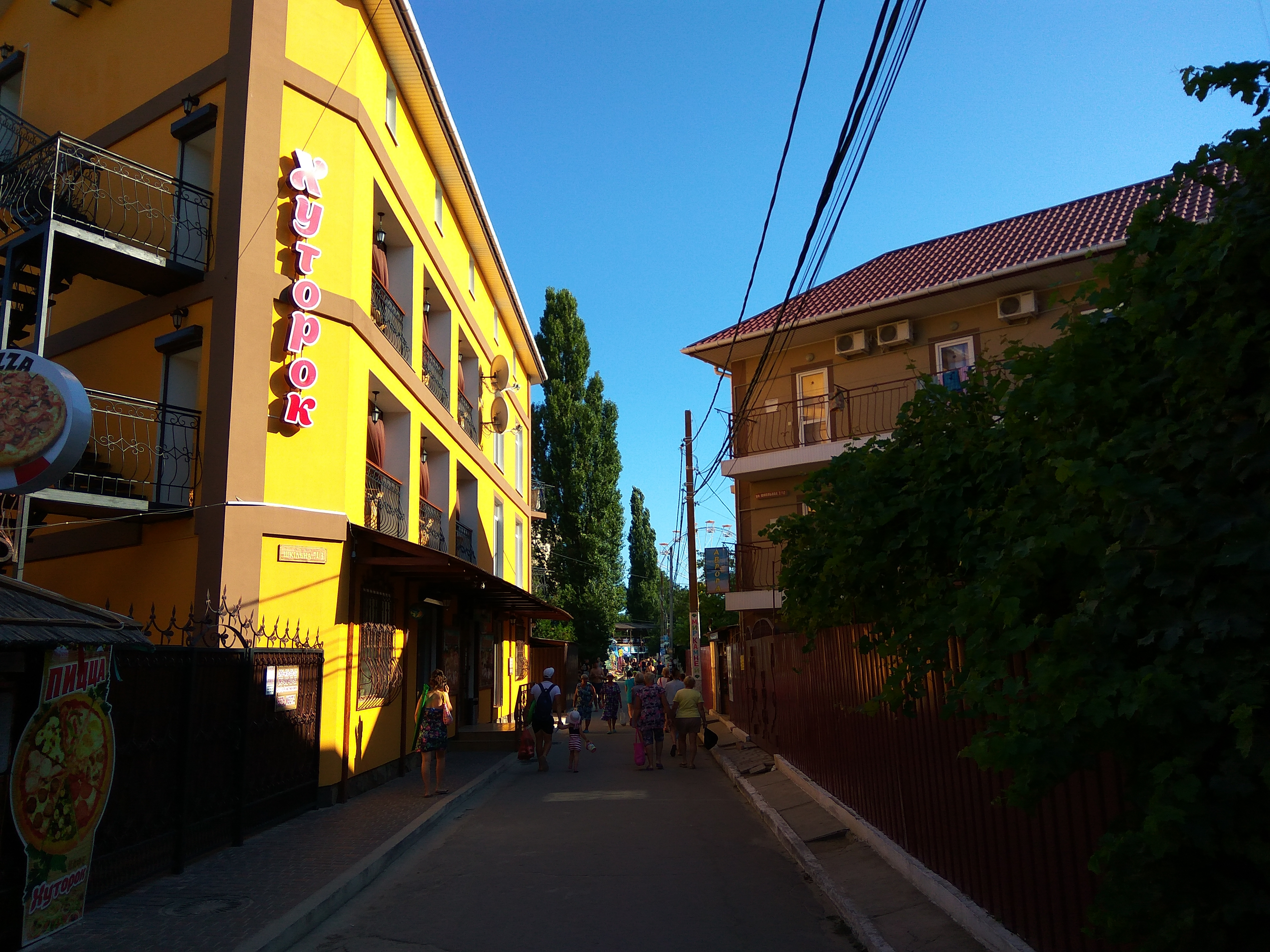
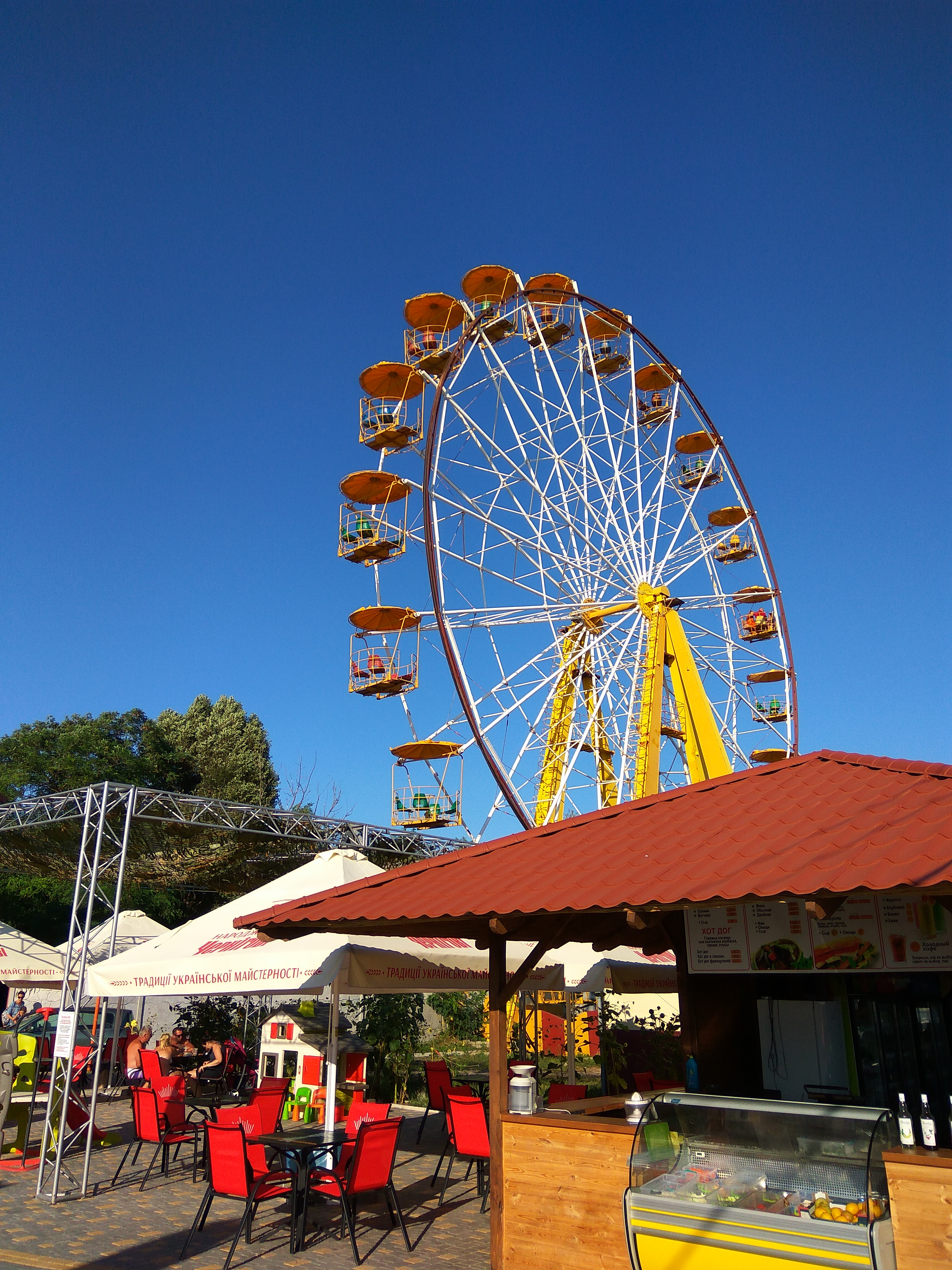
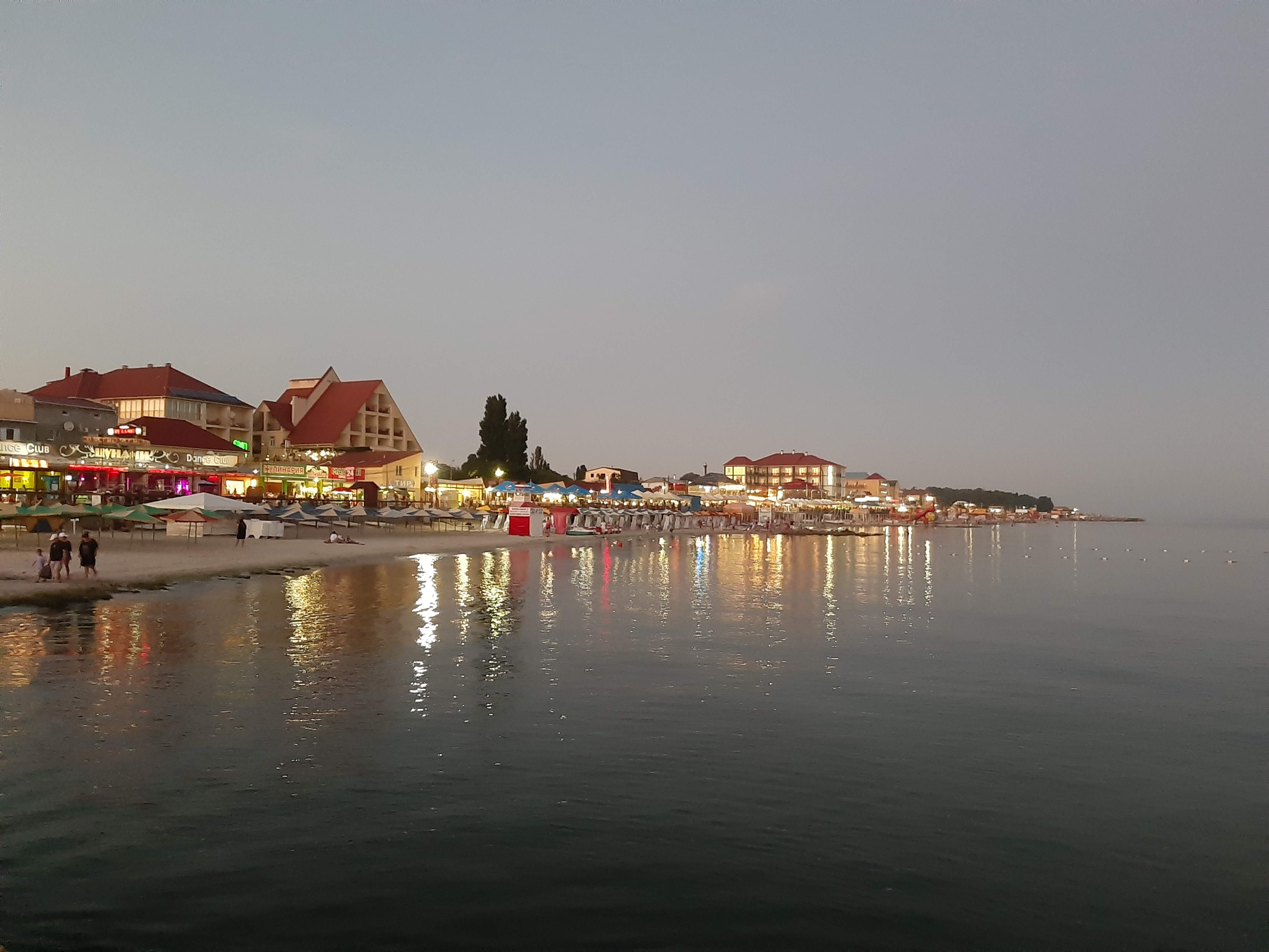

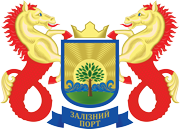
- Coat of arms

- Location of Zaliznyi Port Zaliznyi Port (Ukraine)
- Coordinates: 46°07′30″N 32°17′27″E
- Country: Ukraine
- Oblast: Kherson Oblast
- Raion: Skadovsk Raion
- Hromada: Bekhtery rural hromada
- First settled: 1922
- Control: Occupied by Russia

Area
  - Total: 2,170 km^{2} (840 sq mi)

Population (2001)
  - Total: ▼1,495
- Postal code: 75653
- Area code: +380-5539
- Website: zhelezny-port.ucoz.ua

Zalizniy Port (Ukrainian: Залізний Порт, lit. 'Iron Port'; Russian: Зализный Порт), also known as Zhelezny Port (Russian: Железный Порт), is a resort village (selo) along the Black Sea coast, located in the Bekhtery rural hromada of Skadovsk Raion of Kherson Oblast in Ukraine. It is situated near the outskirts of the Black Sea Biosphere Reserve, being located ~45 km from Skadovsk and ~60 km from Kherson cities.

== Administrative status ==
Upon Ukrainian independence, Zaliznyi Port was administratively subordinated to the Novofedorivka Village Council of Bekhtery rural hromada of Hola Prystan Raion of Kherson Oblast. In December 1997, it was officially designated a resort village by the Ukrainian Verkhovna Rada. Since the abolition of Hola Prystan raion in the 2020 Administrative reform, it has been part of Skadovsk Raion of Kherson oblast, while maintaining the same lower-order territorial subdivisions of prior.

The Russian occupation of Kherson has reverted the 2020 reform in the territories under its control, administering Zaliznyi Port as part of Hola Prystan Raion.

== History ==
=== Origin ===
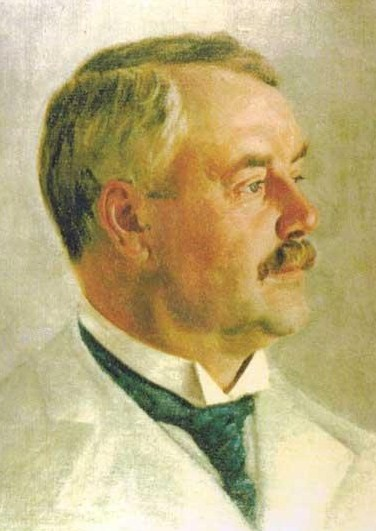
Baron von Falz-Fein

There are two main theories among historians as to the origin of the name "Zaliznyi Port", which translates to "Iron Port". The first, official version, claims that there was originally a pier connected to an Iron bridge in the village, extending over 100 meters into the sea, and at which ships loaded and unloaded, which became known as the Iron Port. Eventually, the bridge collapsed, but the name remained and was applied to the whole village. The second version claims that the name "Iron Port" began as a name sailors out at sea used as a guiding point, due to being guided by the light reflection of an iron roof on a barn there.

Although the village has its origins in the late 19th century under the Russian Empire, when Baron von Falz-Fein helped create a settlement there, it was formally founded under the Soviet Union in 1922 when it was given its name. According to official sources, in the early 1920s peasants from the city of Hladkivka, then known as Kelehei (Ukrainian: Келегеї), settled Zaliznyi Port and engaged in agricultural work, whose products were exported using ships loaded on the Black Sea coast. By the 1940s, there was still only one street in the village, running across the seashore.

Following the Annexation of Crimea by the Russian Federation, Zaliznyi Port developed as a popular tourist attraction for Ukrainians, due to bans on travel to the occupied Crimean peninsula.

=== Russo-Ukrainian war ===
Subsequent to the start of the 2022 Russian invasion of Ukraine, during the Southern Ukraine campaign, the village was entirely occupied by Russian forces. This led to a collapse of the village's tourism industry, causing some locals to protest the invasion. The protestors chanted the phrase "Zaliznyi Port is Ukraine" (Ukrainian: Залізний Порт – це Україна), alongside singing the Ukrainian anthem and waving the Ukrainian flag.

On 4 April 2022, head of the Bekhtery rural hromada, Mykhailo Burak, was allegedly kidnapped by Russian forces while in Zaliznyi Port, according to Ukrainian sources.

Ukrainian MP and Russian-collaborationist politician Aleksey Kovalyov, the former deputy head of Russian-occupied Kherson oblast, was assassinated in Zaliznyi Port on 28 August 2022.

On 15 September 2022, some news outlets claimed that Ukrainian forces attempted simultaneous naval landings on the Kinburn Split, Lazurne, and Zaliznyi Port. Both Kirill Stremousov, head of the Russian Kherson military-civilian administration, and Serhii Bratchuk, head of the Ukrainian Odesa Regional Military Administration, denied all reports of fighting in Zaliznyi Port.

The National Resistance Center of the Ukrainian Ministry of Defense claimed on 12 October 2022 that an unspecified amount of Iranian military instructors were present in the settlements of Zaliznyi Port, Hladkivka, and Dzhankoi to train and monitor Russian forces in the use of Shahed-136 suicide drones. The Institute for the Study of War assessed that the instructors were likely a part of, or affiliated with, the Islamic Revolutionary Guard Corps.

On 10 February 2023, it was reported by the General staff of the Armed Forces of Ukraine that the occupational authorities had begun issuing Russian passports to the local population of Zaliznyi Port.

== Demographics ==
=== Population ===
According to the 1989 USSR census, the population of the village consisted of 1,506 people, 756 of which were men and 750 women.

According to the 2001 Ukrainian census, the village had a population of 1,495.

=== Language ===
Distribution of the population by native language according to the 2001 Ukrainian census:

Languages in Zaliznyi Port
Languages	percent
Ukrainian	79.06%
Russian	19.57%
Armenian	0.72%
Moldovan	0.39%
Bulgarian	0.07%

== Gallery ==
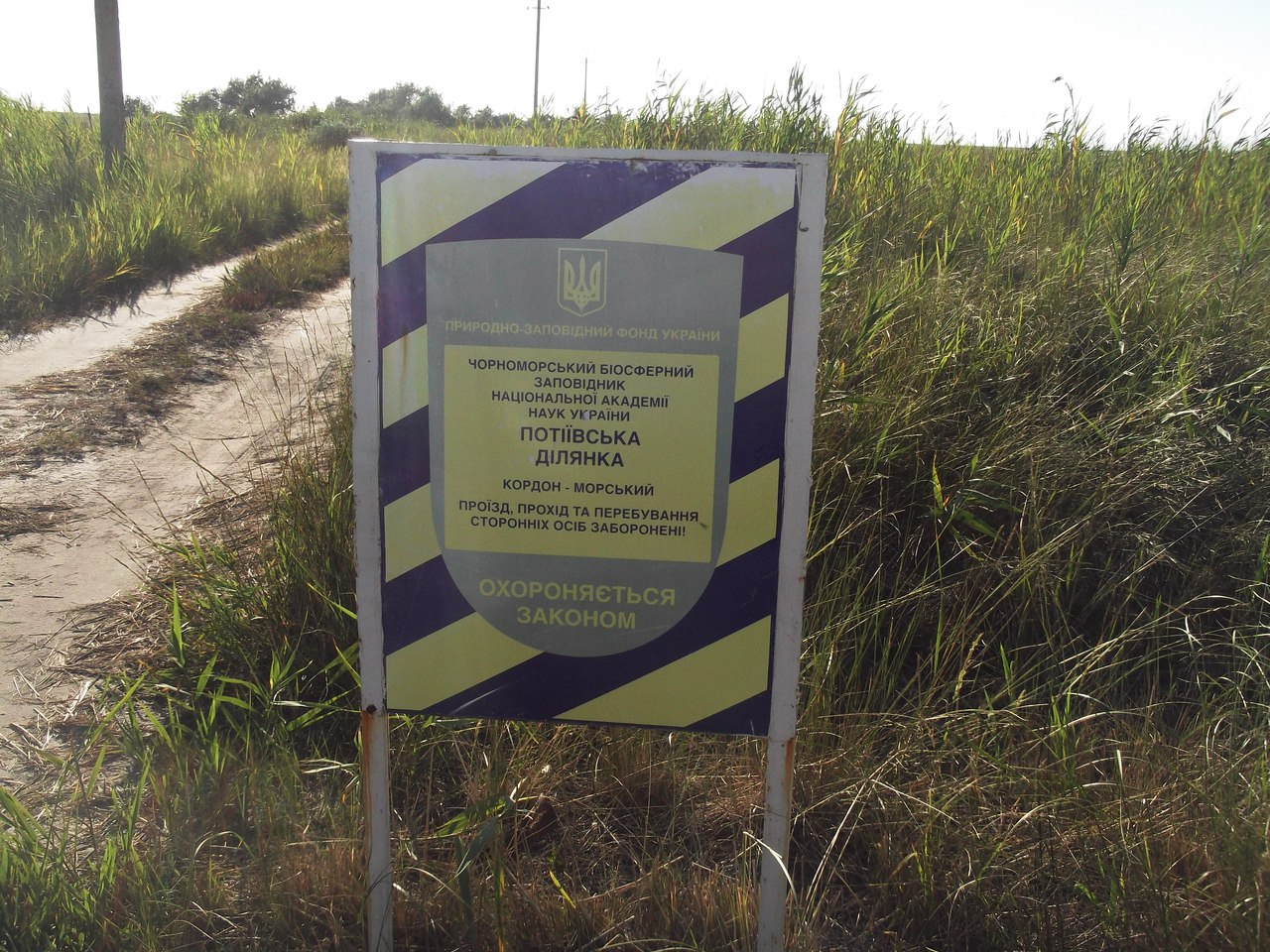
An entrance to the Black Sea Biosphere Reserve from Zaliznyi Port

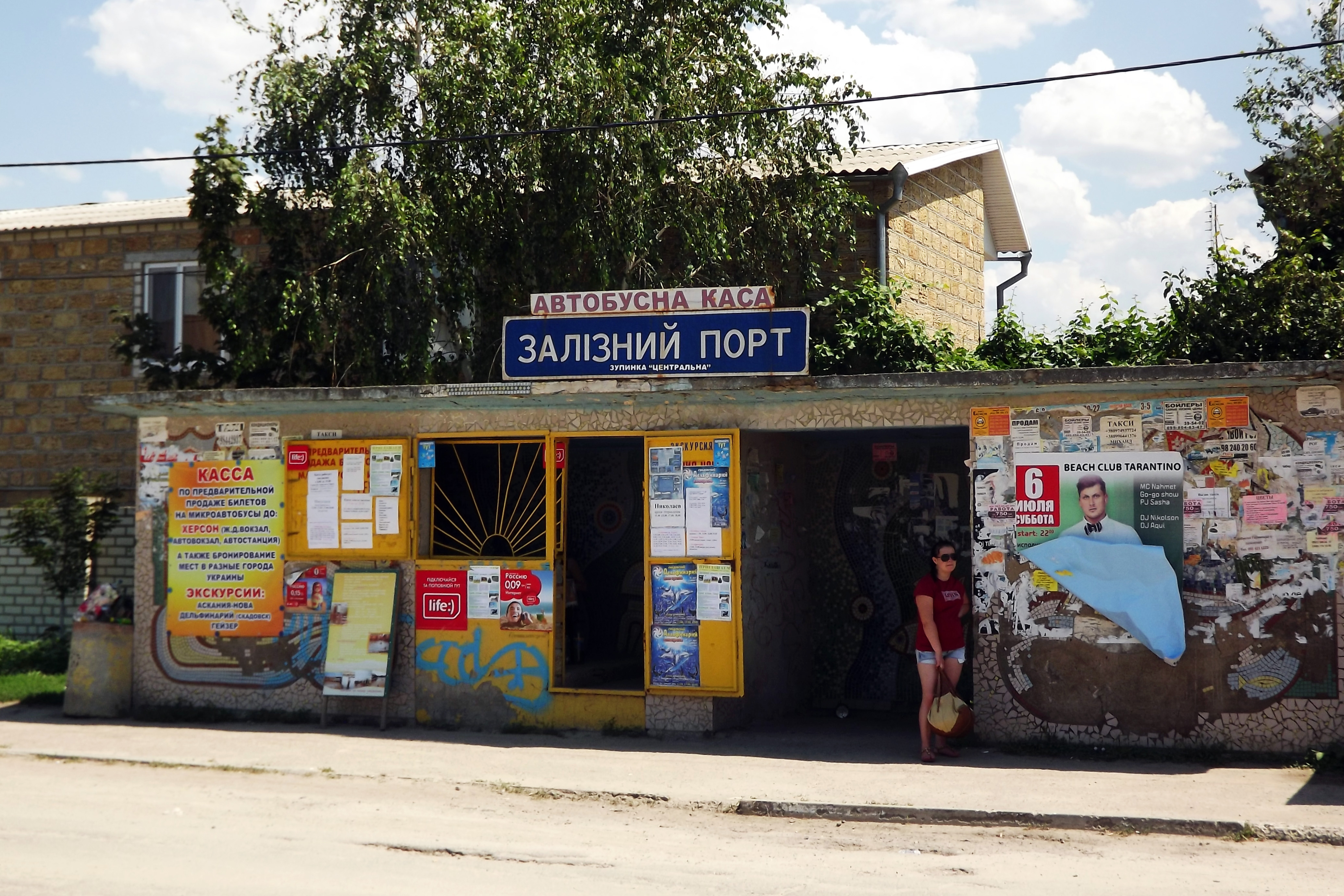
A bus stop in Zaliznyi Port

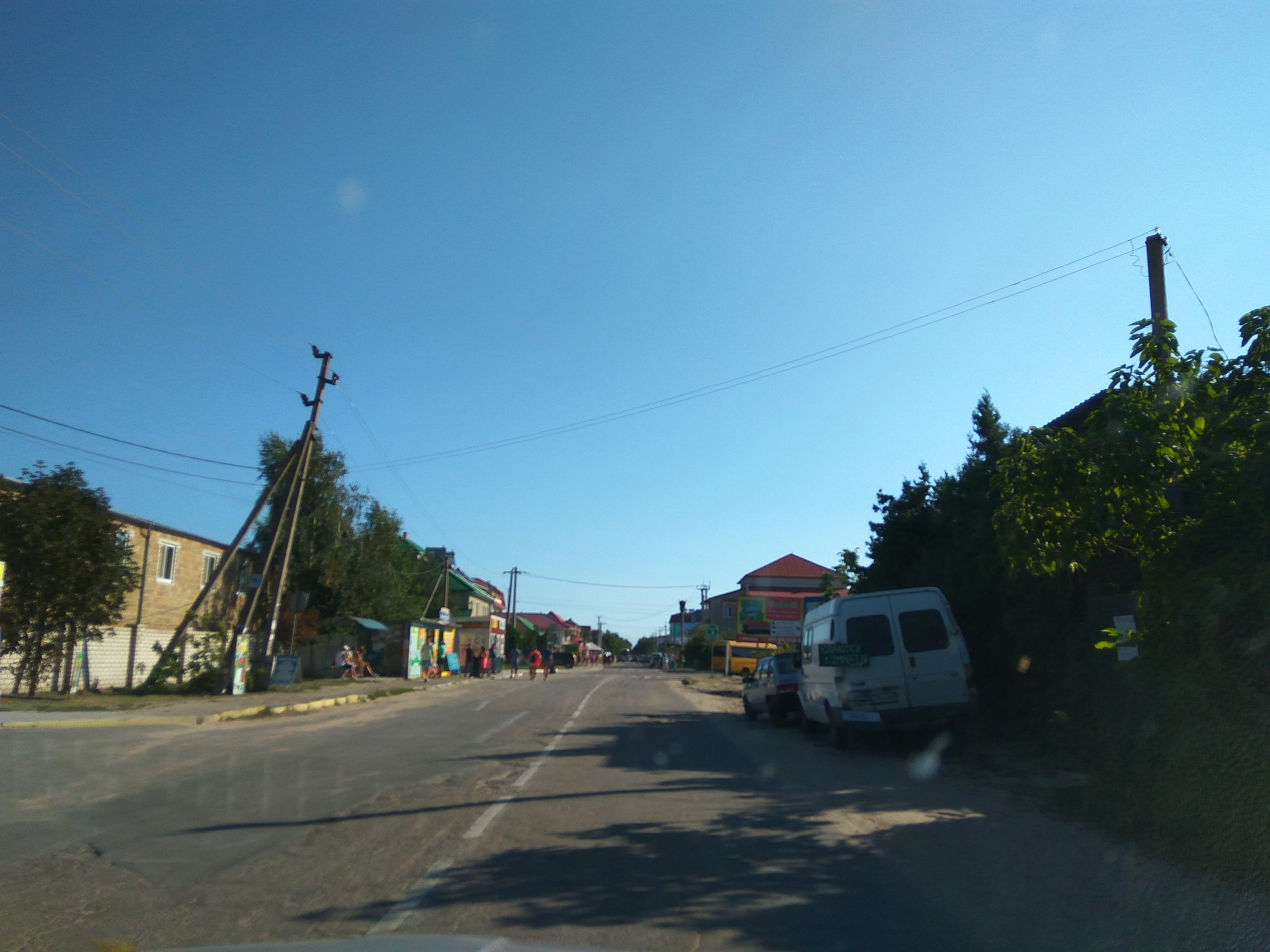
A street in Zaliznyi Port with cars parked along it

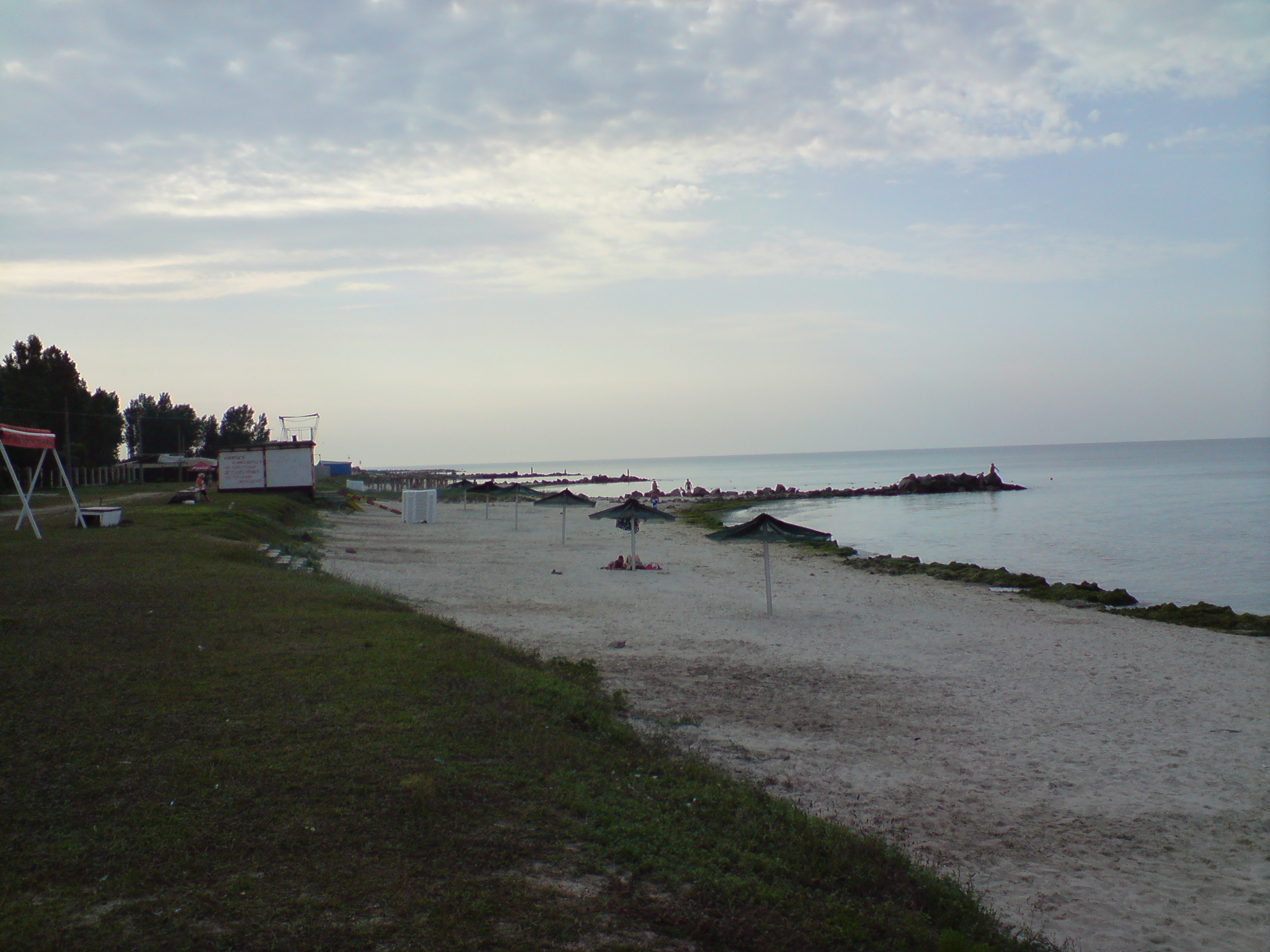
A coastline view in Zaliznyi Port

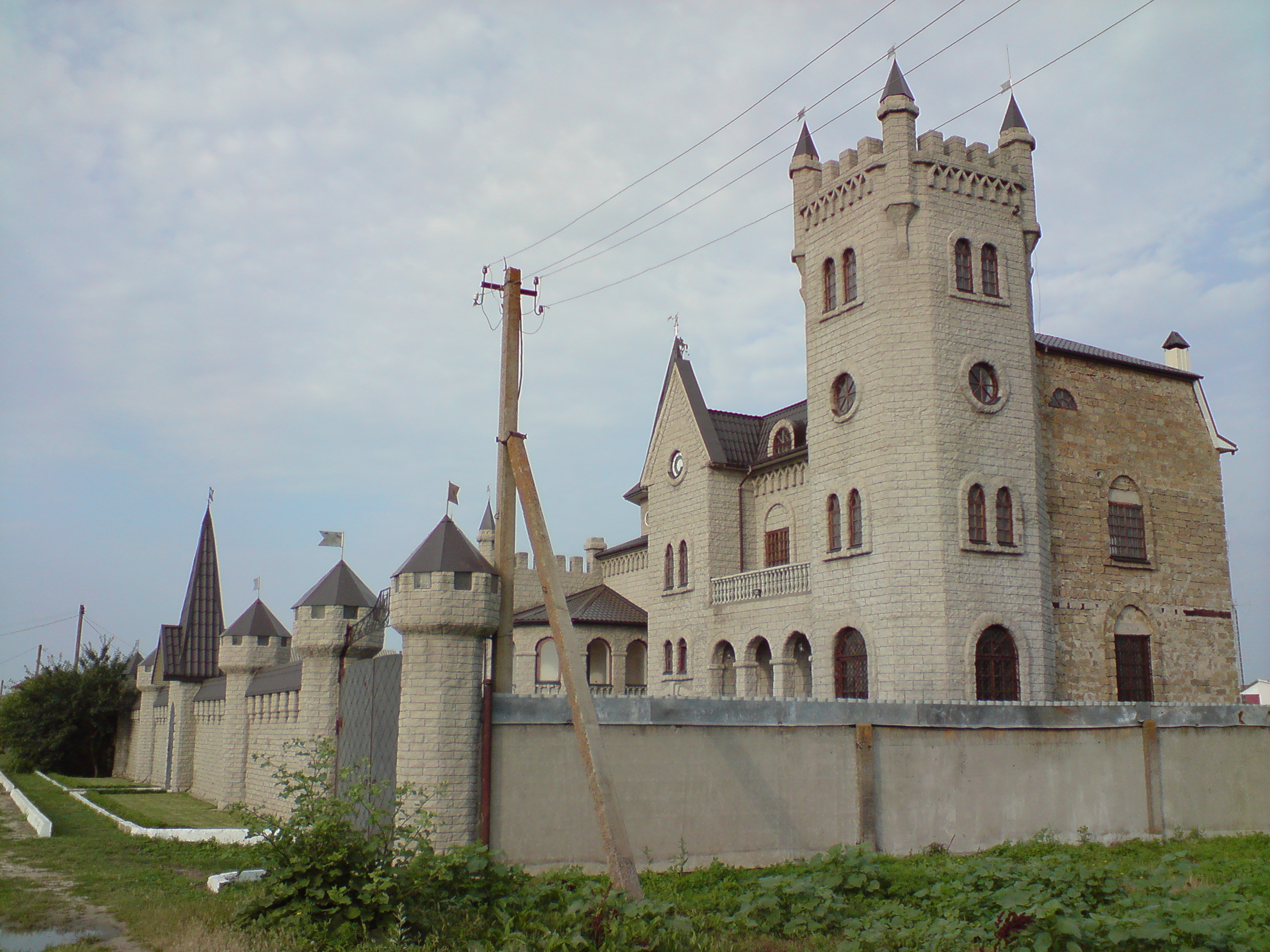
Zaliznyi Port castle

== See also ==
Novofedorivka (Skadovsk Raion)
