= Vitaly Bulyuk =

Ukrainian politician

- Віталій Булюк

Deputy Governor of the Russian occupation of Kherson Oblast
- Incumbent
- Assumed office 2022 - present
- Preceded by: None

Personal details
- Born: Віталій Вікторович Булюк; 21 December 1969 (age 56) Hladkivka, Kherson Oblast, Ukrainian SSR, USSR
- Party: Our Land
- Children: 3
- Awards: Order "For Merit" (2013)

Vitaly Viktorovich Bulyuk (Ukrainian: Віталій Вікторович Булюк; born December 21, 1969) is a Ukrainian politician and Russian collaborator, who is the deputy governor of the Russian occupation of Kherson Oblast. He was a member of the Kherson Oblast Council before collaboration.

== Biography ==
Bulyuk was born in Hladkivka, then in Hola Prystan Raion, Kherson Oblast, Ukraine.

From 2012 to 2013, Bulyuk was head of the State Customs Service of Ukraine branch in Kherson Oblast. Then from 2013 to 2015, Bulyuk became head of the Customs Service's the Ministry of Revenue branch in Kherson.

On December 4, 2015, Bulyuk was elected to become the deputy head of the Kherson Oblast Council.

=== Russian invasion of Ukraine ===
On December 12, 2022, Bulyuk suffered a car bomb attack while travelling in Skadovsk. Bulyuk was injured, and his driver died from the attack. In the same month, the legitimate Kherson Oblast Council voted to remove Bulyuk of his deputy powers due to his wartime collaboration.

Because of his collaboration with Russia, Bulyuk is sanctioned by the U.S. Department of Treasury on February 23, 2024, as well as by the U.S. Office of Foreign Assets Control and by the Special Economic Measures Act of Canada.

== Awards ==
In 2013, then head of Ministry of Revenues and Duties of Ukraine, Oleksandr Klymenko, awarded Bulyuk the Order "For Merit".
