= Oleksii Kovalov =

Ukrainian entrepreneur and politician (1989–2022)

Oleksiy Kovalov
- Олексій Ковальов
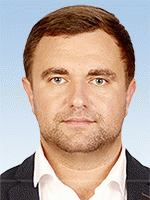
- Official portrait, 2019

People's Deputy of Ukraine
- In office 29 August 2019 – 28 August 2022
- Preceded by: Fedir Nehoi
- Constituency: Kherson Oblast, No. 186

Personal details
- Born: 19 January 1989 Hola Prystan, Ukrainian SSR, Soviet Union
- Died: 28 August 2022 (aged 33) Hola Prystan, Kherson Oblast, Ukraine
- Cause of death: Gunshot wounds
- Party: Servant of the People (expelled)
- Education: National University Odesa Law Academy
- Awards: Order of Courage (posthumous)

Oleksiy Ivanovych Kovalov (Ukrainian: Олексій Іванович Ковальов, Russian: Алексей Иванович Ковалёв, romanized: Aleksey Ivanovich Kovalyov; 19 January 1989 – 28 August 2022) was a Ukrainian politician who served as a People's Deputy of Ukraine representing Ukraine's 186th electoral district as a member of Servant of the People from 2019 until his assassination in 2022. A few months before his death, he had begun collaborating with Russia during the Russian invasion of Ukraine.

== Biography ==
Kovalov was elected in the 2019 Ukrainian parliamentary election as a member of the Servant of the People party after winning in Ukraine's 186th electoral district (centred around Hola Prystan) with 35.12% of the votes. He entered Ukraine's national parliament, the Verkhovna Rada in August 2019.

Two months into the Russian invasion of Ukraine, at the beginning of April 2022 Kovalov stated that he was in Russian occupied Hola Prystan "to work in his electoral district." He did not report to the Verkhovna Rada where he was or what he was doing.

On 28 April, the Servant of the People faction announced that it had suspended Kovalov's membership in the party and the faction. Kovalov was then expelled from the Servant of the People party on 3 May 2022.

On 8 June 2022, Kovalov admitted on his Facebook page to collaborating with the Russian occupiers in the Kherson Oblast.

On 22 June 2022, it was reported that Kovalov had been killed in Kherson Oblast at the age of 33. However, on 30 June 2022, Russian media released a video of Kovalov in the hospital, in which he accused the Ukrainian Security Service of attempting to assassinate him. Also on 30 June 2022, First Deputy Chairman of the Verkhovna Rada Oleksandr Kornienko stated that Kovalov's mandate could be removed only after a court ruling because the Ukrainian Constitution does not include collaborationism as grounds for depriving an MP of their mandate.

According to Ukrainian authorities at the beginning of July, Kovalov assumed the position of deputy created by the Russian occupying administration, "head of the government of Kherson Oblast".

On 28 August 2022, several Telegram channels reported the murder of Kovalov. The following day the Investigative Committee of Russia confirmed Kovalov's death. According to them, Kovalev died as a result of a gunshot wound during an attack at his place of residence in Zaliznyi Port on 28 August 2022. A woman who lived with Kovalev reportedly was also killed.

On 7 October 2022, the Russian President Vladimir Putin posthumously awarded him with the Order of Courage for "dedication and courage".

Since no official death certificate could have been received by parliament, necessary for his termination of office as a People's Deputy of Ukraine, Kovalyov will technically stay a member of the Verkhovna Rada until the next Ukrainian parliamentary election or until an official death certificate is received.

== See also ==
- List of members of the Verkhovna Rada of Ukraine who died in office
- List of deaths during the Russian invasion of Ukraine
- Collaboration with Russia during the Russian invasion of Ukraine
