= Sadove, Skadovsk Raion, Kherson Oblast =

Settlement in Kherson Oblast, Ukraine

Sadove Садове
- Rural settlement
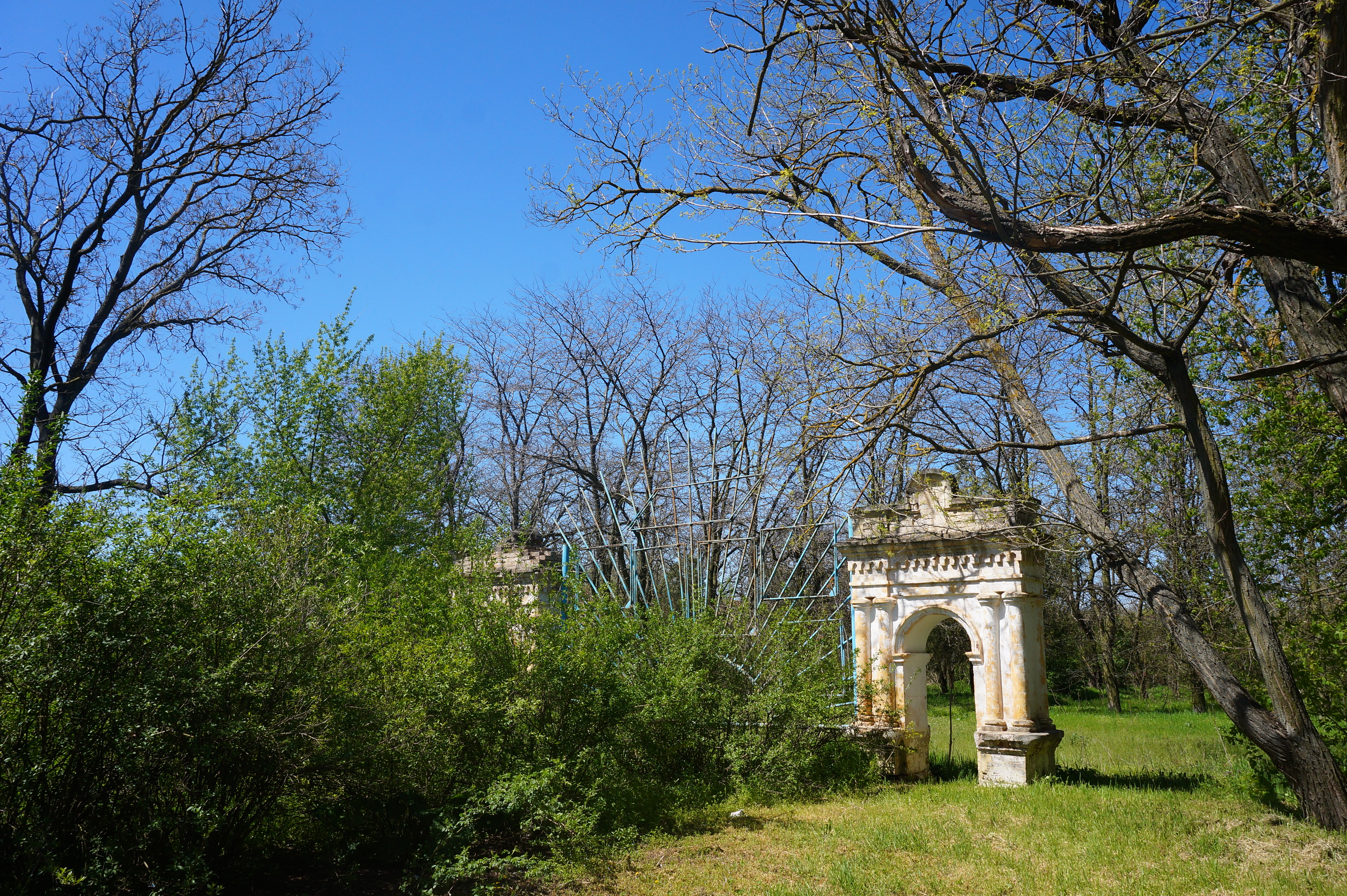
- Panski Vorota, the old entrance to Pivdennyi Park
- Interactive map of Sadove
- Location of Sadove within Ukraine Sadove (Ukraine)
- Coordinates: 46.356667°N 32.185833°E
- Country: Ukraine
- Oblast: Kherson Oblast
- Raion: Skadovsk Raion
- Founded: before 1900

Area
  - Total: 1.15 km^{2} (0.44 sq mi)
- Elevation: 7 m (23 ft)

Population (2001 census)
  - Total: 684
  - Density: 595/km^{2} (1,540/sq mi)
- Time zone: UTC+2 (EET)
  - Summer (DST): UTC+3 (EEST)
- Postal code: 75622
- Area code: +380 5539

Sadove (Ukrainian: Садове; Russian: Садовое) is a rural settlement (selyshche) in Skadovsk Raion of Kherson Oblast in southern Ukraine, located 44.74 kilometres (27.80 mi) southwest (SW) of the center of Kharkiv city. It belongs to Chulakivka rural hromada, one of the hromadas of Ukraine.

== History ==
The settlement was founded before 1900.

=== Russian invasion of Ukraine ===
On 24 February 2022, the settlement was occupied by Russian forces during the Russian-Ukrainian war.

On 7 June 2024, an attack by Ukrainian Armed Forces on the settlement left 22 people killed and 15 wounded according to the Russian occupational administration.

== Demographics ==
As of the 2001 Ukrainian census, the settlement had 684 inhabitants, whose native languages were 89.90% Ukrainian, 9.37% Russian, 0.29% Belarusian and 0.15% Moldovan (Romanian).
