= Hladkivka =

Hladkivka or Gladkovka (transliterated from Russian) may refer to:

- Hladkivka, Skladovsk Raion, Kherson Oblast, Ukraine
- Hladkivka, Bohodukhiv Raion, Kharkiv Oblast, Ukraine
- Hladkivka, Donetsk, neighborhood of Donetsk, Ukraine
