= Lazurne, Kherson Oblast =

Rural locality in Kherson Oblast, Ukraine

Lazurne Лазурне
- Rural settlement
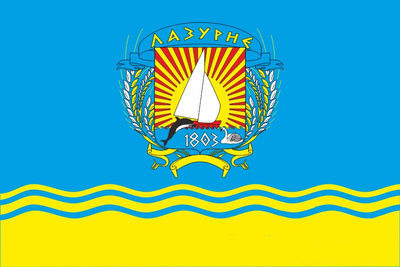
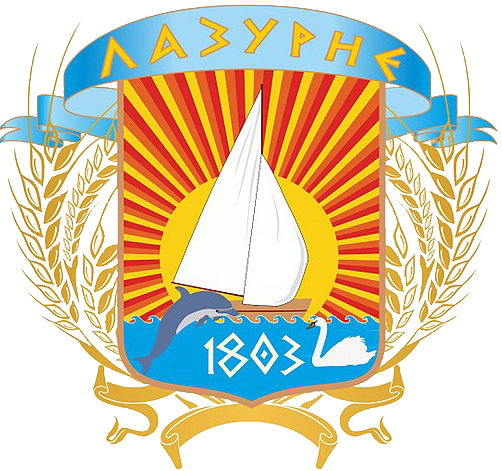
- Flag Coat of arms

- Location within Kherson Oblast Location within Ukraine
- Coordinates: 46°4′51″N 32°31′12″E
- Country: Ukraine
- Oblast: Kherson Oblast
- Raion: Skadovsk Raion
- Hromada: Lazurne settlement hromada
- Founded: 1803
- Urban-type settlement status since: 1975

Area
  - Total: 7,153 km^{2} (2,762 sq mi)

Population (2022)
  - Total: 3,082 ▼
  - Density: 0.4309/km^{2} (1.116/sq mi)
- Postal code: 75723
- Area code: +380 5537

Lazurne (Ukrainian: Лазурне; until 1975: Novooleksiivka) is a rural settlement in Skadovsk Raion, Kherson Oblast, southern Ukraine, situated on the coast of the Black Sea. It is located 28 kilometres (17 mi) west of Skadovsk and 100 kilometres (62 mi) from Kherson. The closest railway station, Brylivka, is located 80 km away. Lazurne hosts the administration of the Lazurne settlement hromada, one of the hromadas of Ukraine. It had a population of 3,082 (2022 estimate). Dzharylhach is a long sandbank that stretches out to the east of the settlement.

== History ==
Lazurne was captured by Russian ground forces on the first day of the Russian Invasion of Ukraine, the second phase of the escalating Russo-Ukrainian War, when they crossed the nearby border of the de facto Republic of Crimea.

In July 2022, it was reported that Armed Forces of Ukraine have destroyed a modern radar station of the Russians in the village of Lazurne, Kherson Oblast.

Until 26 January 2024, Lazurne was designated urban-type settlement. On this day, a new law entered into force which abolished this status, and Lazurne became a rural settlement.

== Culture ==
The settlement is a large climatic seaside recreation center of the region. There are about 30 lodges and summer camps in Lazurne.
