= Chulakivka =

Urban locality in Kherson Oblast, Ukraine

Chulakivka Чулаківка
- Village
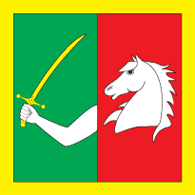
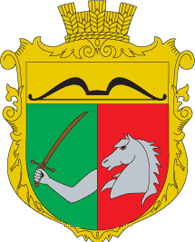
- Flag Coat of arms
- Interactive map of Chulakivka
- Location in Kherson Oblast Chulakivka (Ukraine)
- Coordinates: 46°21′34″N 32°20′56″E
- Country: Ukraine
- Oblast: Kherson Oblast
- Raion: Skadovsk Raion
- Time zone: UTC+2 (EET)
  - Summer (DST): UTC+3 (EEST)

Chulakivka (Ukrainian: Чулаківка) is a village in Skadovsk Raion, Kherson Oblast, southern Ukraine. The village hosts the administration of Chulakivka rural hromada, one of the hromadas of Ukraine. It had a population of 3,087. Its local government is the Chulakivka village council.

== Administrative status ==
Until 18 July 2020, Chulakivka belonged to Hola Prystan Raion. The raion was abolished in July 2020 as part of the administrative reform of Ukraine, which reduced the number of raions of Kherson Oblast to five. The area of Hola Prystan Raion was merged into Skadovsk Raion.

== History ==
Chulakivka was founded in 1751 under the Russian Empire.

=== Russo-Ukrainian War ===
Chulakivka was captured and occupied by the Russian Armed Forces on the first day of the 2022 Russian invasion of Ukraine.

On 14 March 2022, Russian soldiers formed a ring around the village and found saboteurs on the outskirts who opened fire on them. The soldiers conducted an operation the following morning to search for them.

On 31 December of that same year, Ukrainian forces shelled a Russian military quarters in Chulakivka, during which the Ukrainians claimed to have killed or wounded 500 Russian soldiers. The Ukrainian General Staff claimed on their Telegram account that 175 Russians were wounded, while 12 units of equipment were also claimed to have been destroyed.

== Demographics ==
According to the 1989 Soviet census, the population of the village was 3,009 people, of whom 1,442 were men and 1,567 women.

According to the 2001 Ukrainian census, 3,051 people lived in the village.

=== Languages ===
According to the 2001 census, the primary languages of the inhabitants of the village were:

Language	Percentage
Ukrainian	93.88 %
Russian	5.44 %
Belarusian	0.26 %
Moldovan (Romanian)	0.19 %
Armenian	0.06 %

== Infrastructure ==
In the village, the Chulakivka secondary school serves grades one through three.
