= Hladkivka, Skladovsk Raion =

Hladkivka Гладківка
- Village
- Location within Kherson Oblast Location within Ukraine
- Coordinates: 46.4064°N 32.6375°E
- Country: Ukraine
- Oblast: Kherson Oblast
- Raion: Skadovsk Raion

Population
  - Total: 2,912
- Time zone: UTC+2 (EET)
  - Summer (DST): UTC+3 (EEST)
- Postal Code: 75633

Hladkivka (Ukrainian: Гладківка) is a village in southern Ukraine, and is located in Skadovsk Raion of Kherson Oblast. It belonged to Hola Prystan Raion before it was merged into Skladovsk Raion in 2020.

== Demographics ==
In 1886, the population of the village was 2,178.

In the 2001 Ukrainian census, the population was 2,910. Within it, 87.84% spoke Ukrainian as a native language, while 10.51% spoke Russian and 1.65% spoke a third language.

== History ==
In 1870, a rural community called the Kedegei hamlets was established, named after the first peasant settler, a Zaporozhian Cossack named Kelegei. The village mainly consisted of poor peasants as they were forced to move south for suitable farming land due to the Perekop steppes beginning near the village. By the beginning of the twentieth century, a handicraft artell called Progress was located in the village, engaging in the manufacture of agricultural implements. Soviet rule was established later in the fall of 1920, and in 1924 the village was renamed to Kelehei. Two years later, a joint land cultivation society was established, and in 1929 collective farms began to be created, of which there were six of them. During the Great Patriotic War, the village was occupied by German troops from 14 September 1941 to 3 November 1943, before the Soviets regained the village. The village was again renamed to its current name, Hladkivka, after the scout Lieutenant Hladkov who, during World War II, saved the village from the Germans after a scorched earth tactic was going to be used against the village.

The population suffered through the Second Holodomor in 1946-1947, with many dying of starvation. In 1950, one of the collective farms, Frunze, was merged with the other collective farms located in the village. By 1958, there were only two collective farms, Tavria and the XX Congress of the CPSU. In 1994, the village was divided into two parts called Hladkivka and Tavriyske using the Kherson-Skadovsk highway as a border.

In 2022, the village was captured by Russian forces during the southern campaign of the Russian invasion of Ukraine, and currently remains under occupation.

== Sources ==
- Погода в селі Гладківка weather.in.ua (Archived)
