= Hola Prystan =

City in Kherson Oblast, Ukraine

Hola Prystan Гола Пристань
- City
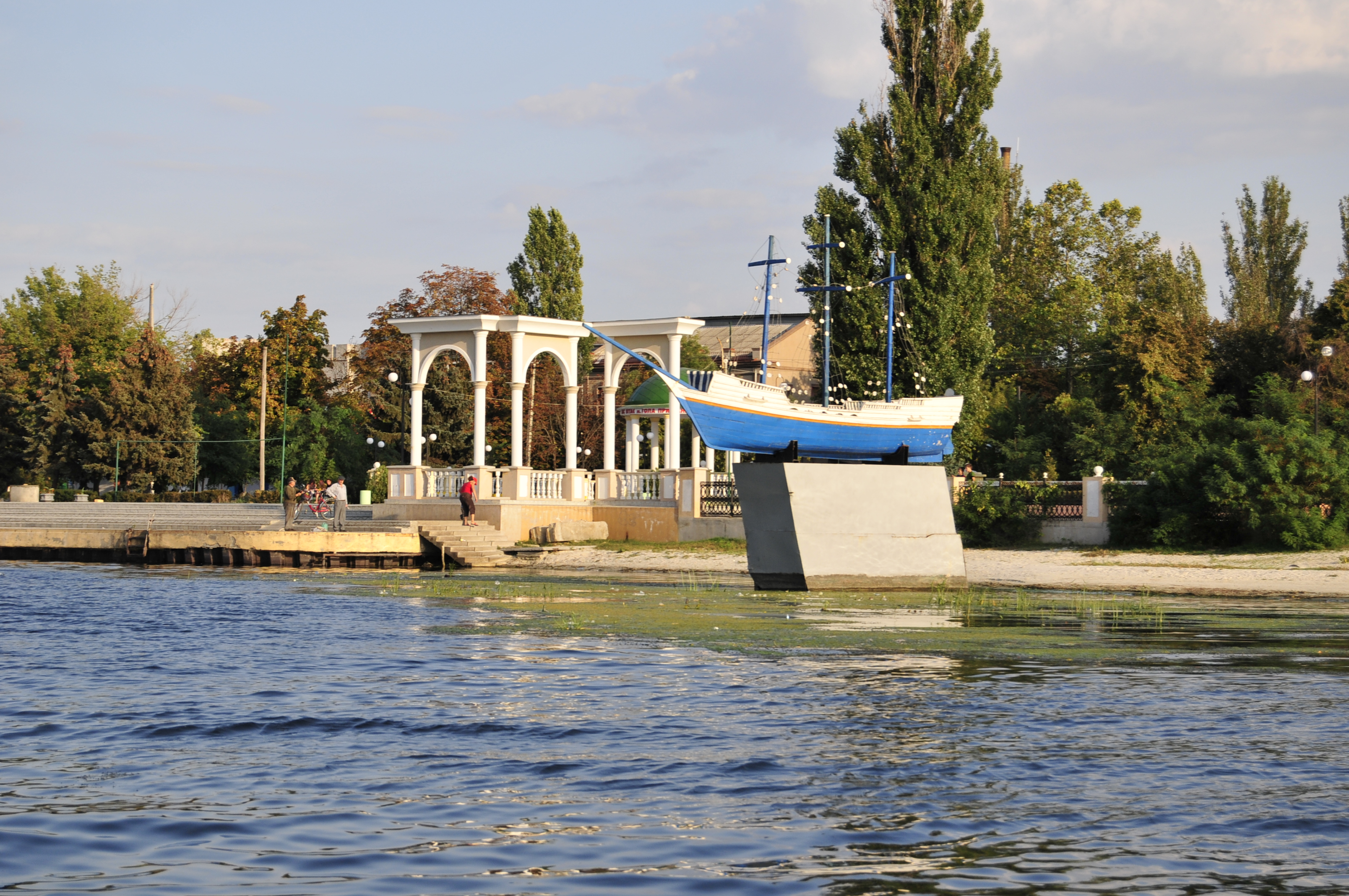
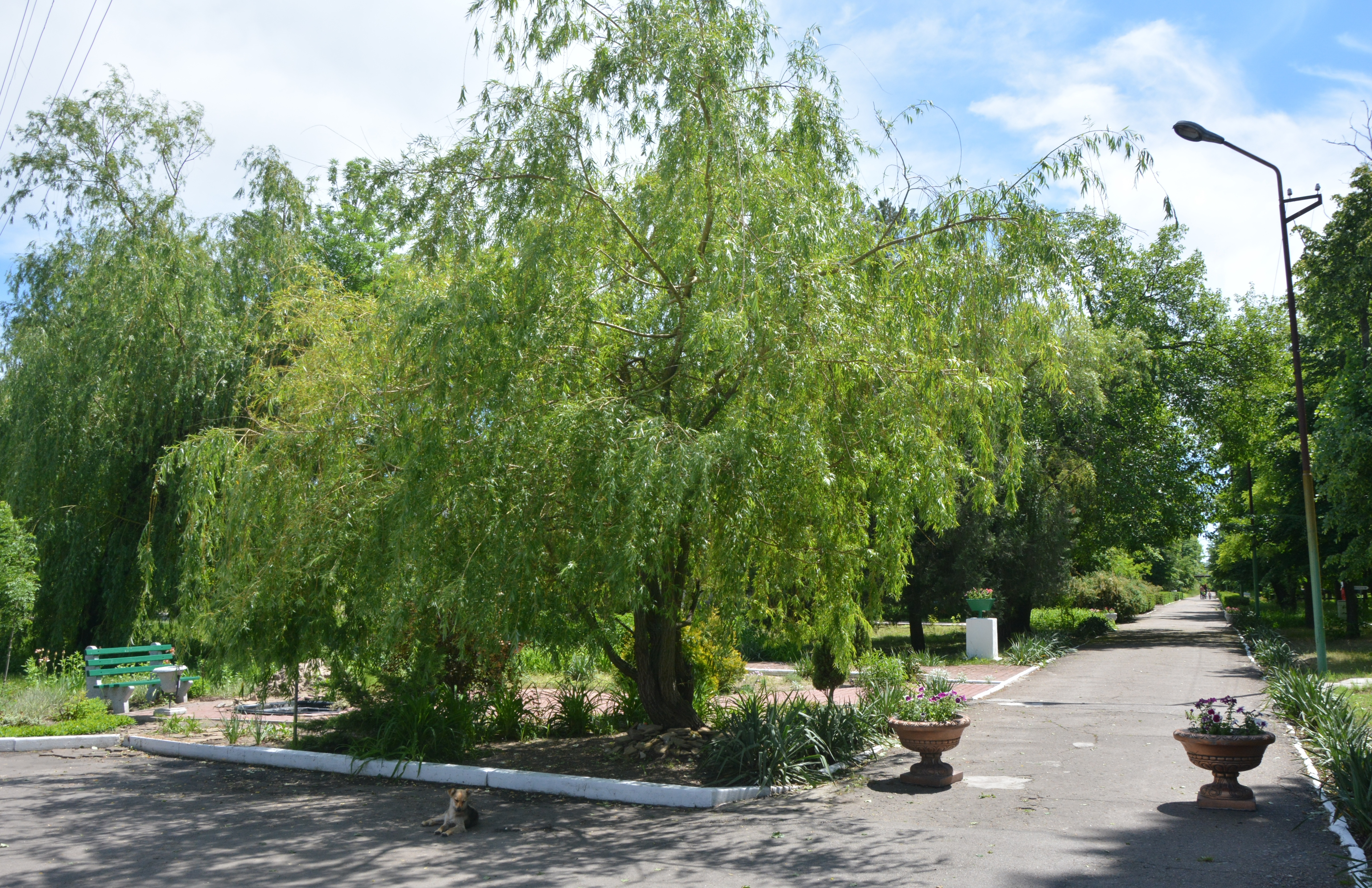
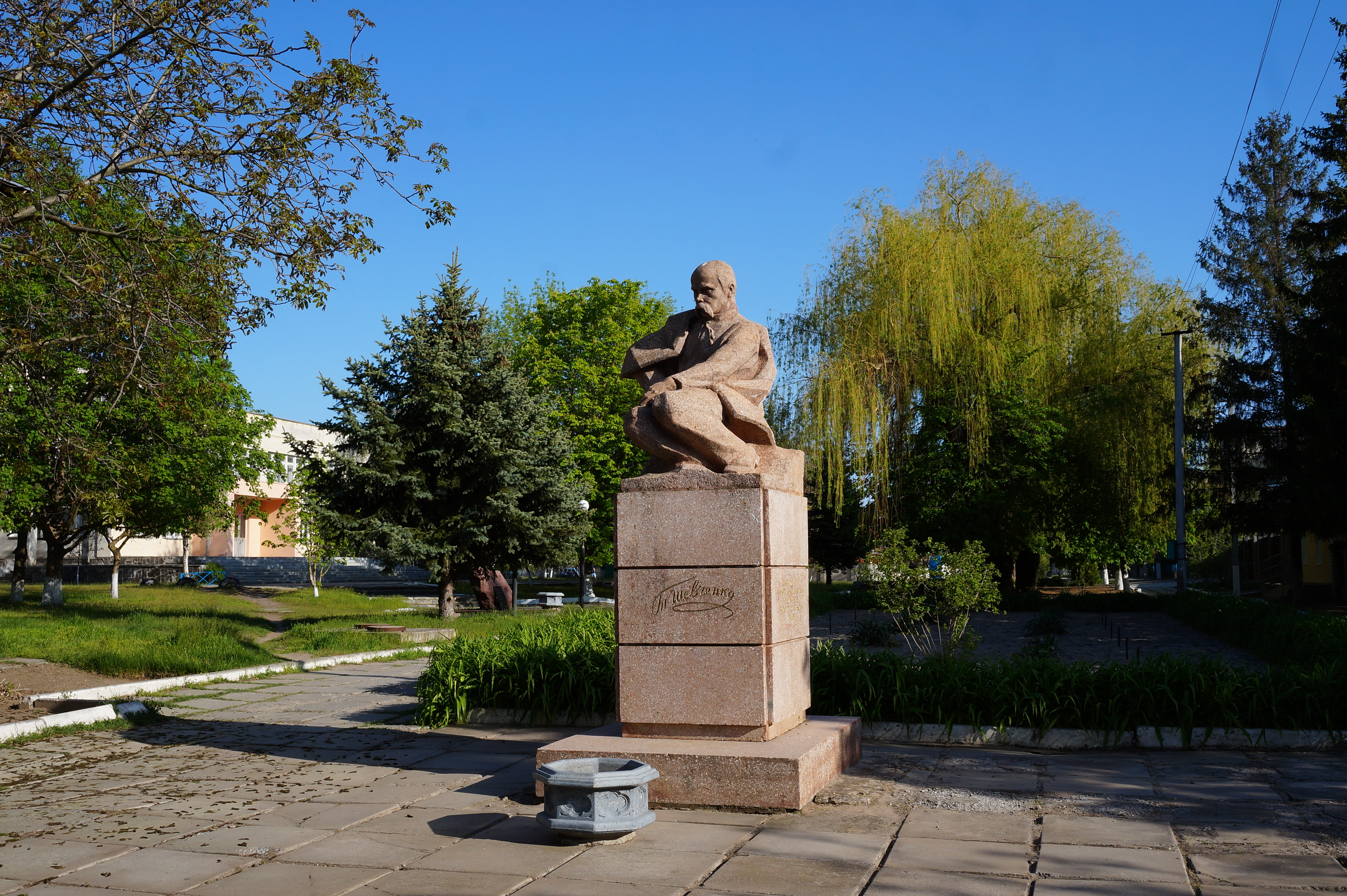

- Flag Coat of arms
- Interactive map of Hola Prystan
- Location of Hola Prystan Hola Prystan (Ukraine)
- Coordinates: 46°31′N 32°31′E
- Country: Ukraine
- Oblast: Kherson Oblast
- Raion: Skadovsk Raion
- Hromada: Hola Prystan urban hromada
- Established: 1709

Area
  - Total: 9 km^{2} (3.5 sq mi)

Population (2022)
  - Total: ▼13,544
- Postal code: 75600
- Area code: +380-5539
- Climate: Cfa
- Website: www.golapristan-mrada.gov.ua

Hola Prystan (Ukrainian: Гола Пристань, lit. 'barren pier', pronounced [ˈɦɔlɐ ˈprɪstɐnʲ]) is a city located in Skadovsk Raion, Kherson Oblast, southern Ukraine. The city is the administrative centre of the Hola Prystan urban hromada, one of the hromadas of Ukraine. It has a population of 13,544 (2022 estimate). The Konka, a tributary of the Dnieper, flows through the city. As of 2026, city has a population of 1800. As of 2026, the city is occupied by Russia.

== Administrative status ==
Until 18 July 2020, Hola Prystan was incorporated as a city of oblast significance and served as the center of Hola Prystan Municipality. It also functioned as the administrative center of Hola Prystan Raion, although it did not belong to the raion itself. As part of the administrative reform of Ukraine, municipality was abolished in July 2020, reducing the number of raions of Kherson Oblast to five. The area that was formerly Hola Prystan Municipality was subsequently merged into Skadovsk Raion.

== History ==
Hola Prystan – literally meaning barren pier – was founded in 1709 by Zaporizhian Cossacks of Oleshky Sich as Holyi Pereviz ('barren river crossing'), but has been known by its current name since 1785. Here, in the early 18th century, the Cossacks built boats and went fishing in the Dnipro estuary, and transported salt from the Prohnoyi salt mines. The conquest of the lands by the Russian Empire in the war with the Ottoman Porte took place in 1774-1783.

Jews apparently began to settle in the town at the beginning of the 19th century and by 1897, they numbered 667, or 11 percent of the total population.

At the turn of the century, many of the businesses in the town were owned by Jews. In 1905, there was a pogrom in which 2 Jewish shops were destroyed. The pogrom was stopped not by the authorities but by the peasants of Hola Prystan, who "with clubs in their hands met the hooligans of other villages eager for a tidbit, and when those started smashing the stores, they fought them".

Under the Soviets, the Jewish population of Hola Prystan fell, mainly due to migration to larger cities in search of jobs and education opportunities. In 1939, the town's 276 Jews comprised 3.6 percent of the total population.

Hola Prystan was occupied by Nazi Germany on September 13, 1941, and on October 12 the same year, the resident Jews were shot outside the town. It was liberated by the Red Army on November 4, 1943.

On 1 August 1997, a Project R1415 (NATO code: Flamingo class) Ukrainian patrol boat was named after the town.

Hola Prystan was granted the status of regional town on May 17, 2013.

=== Russo-Ukrainian War ===
Hola Prystan was captured by Russian ground forces on the first day of the Russian Invasion of Ukraine, the second phase of the escalating Russo-Ukrainian War, when they crossed the nearby border of the already Russian-occupied Crimean peninsula. On March 8, 2022, a few thousand people protested the occupation.

The town was shelled by Ukrainian forces during the war. In 2023, Russian forces opened fire with multiple launch rocket systems in Hola Prystan and Kherson, damaging residential houses and injuring civilians.

Due to the destruction of the Kakhovka Dam, Hola Prystan was flooded. According to Svitlana Linnyk, the head of Hola Prystan city military administration, around 80-85% of the city was submerged.

== Demographics ==
Distribution of the population by ethnic groups and first languages according to the 2001 Ukrainian census:

Ethnic groups in Hola Prystan
	percent
Ukrainians	84.03%
Russians	13.41%
Belarusians	0.52%
Armenians	0.49%
Moldovans	0.26%
Tatars	0.15%

Languages in Hola Prystan
	percent
Ukrainian	80.2%
Russian	19.2%
Armenian	0.3%
Belarusian	0.1%
Romanian	0.1%
others	0.1%

== Economy ==
Hola Prystan houses enterprises of mechanical and shipbuilding and food industries. A mud spa is located near the town.

== Gallery ==
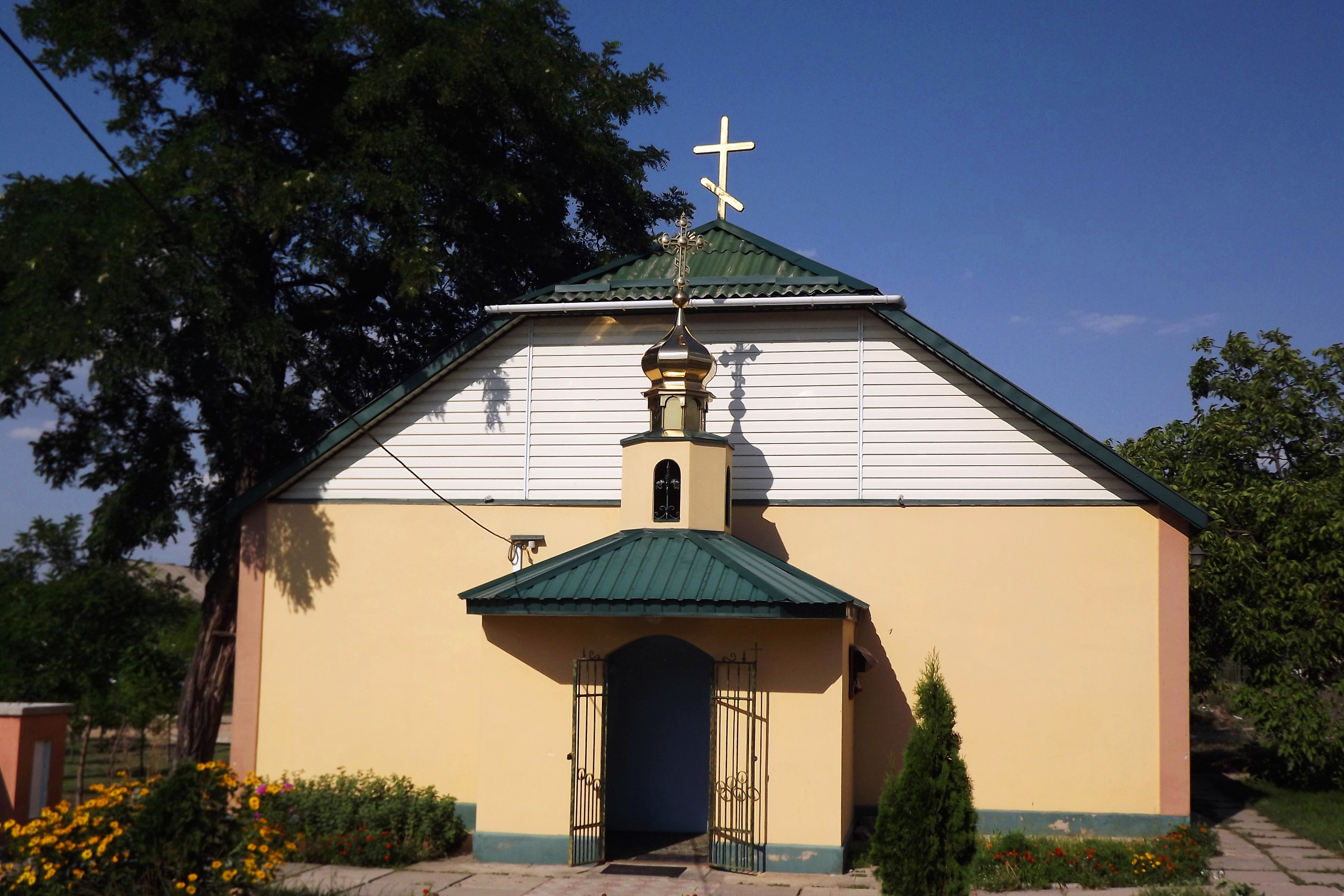
Temporary Saint Volodymyr's Church

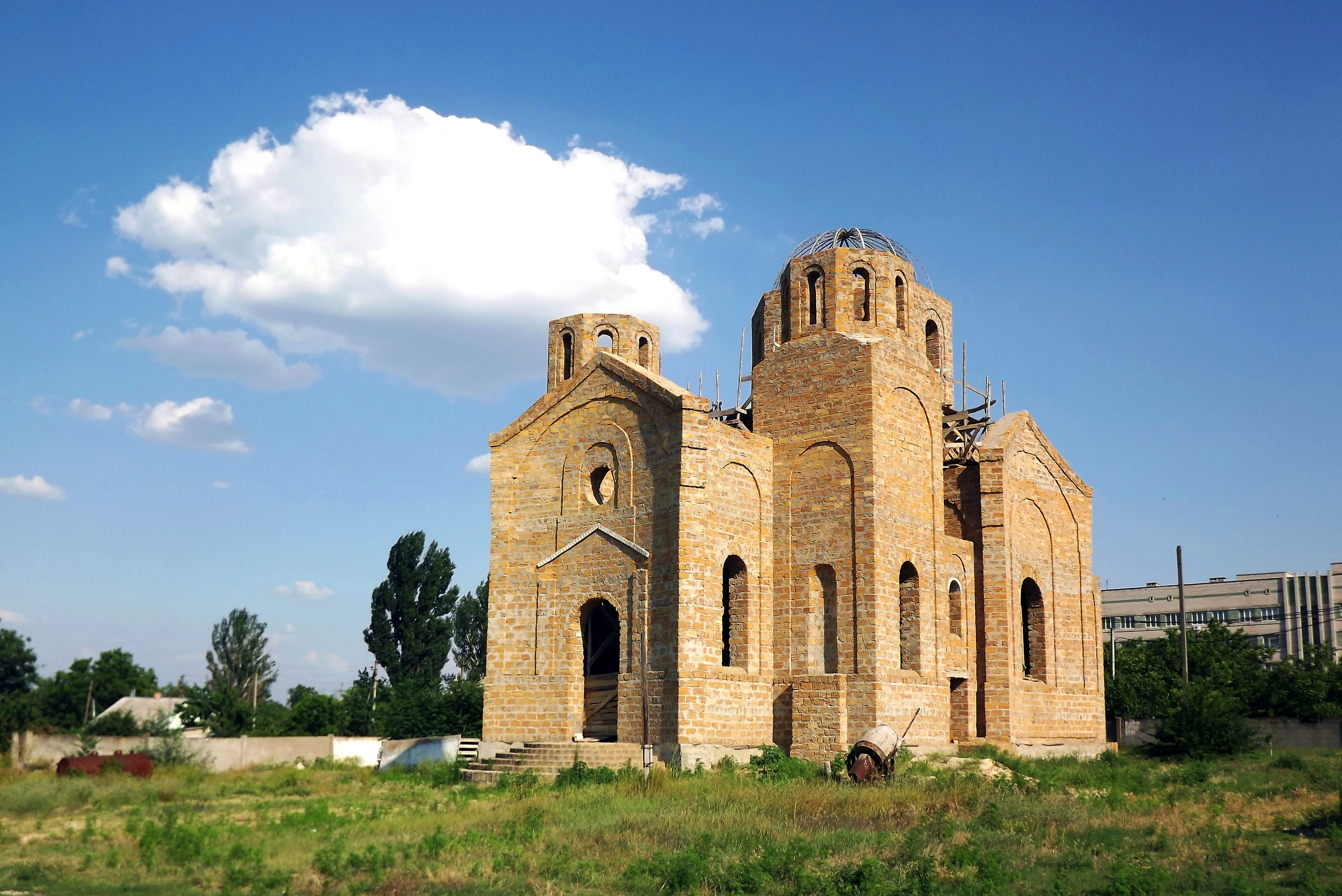
New Saint Volodymyr's Church (2013)

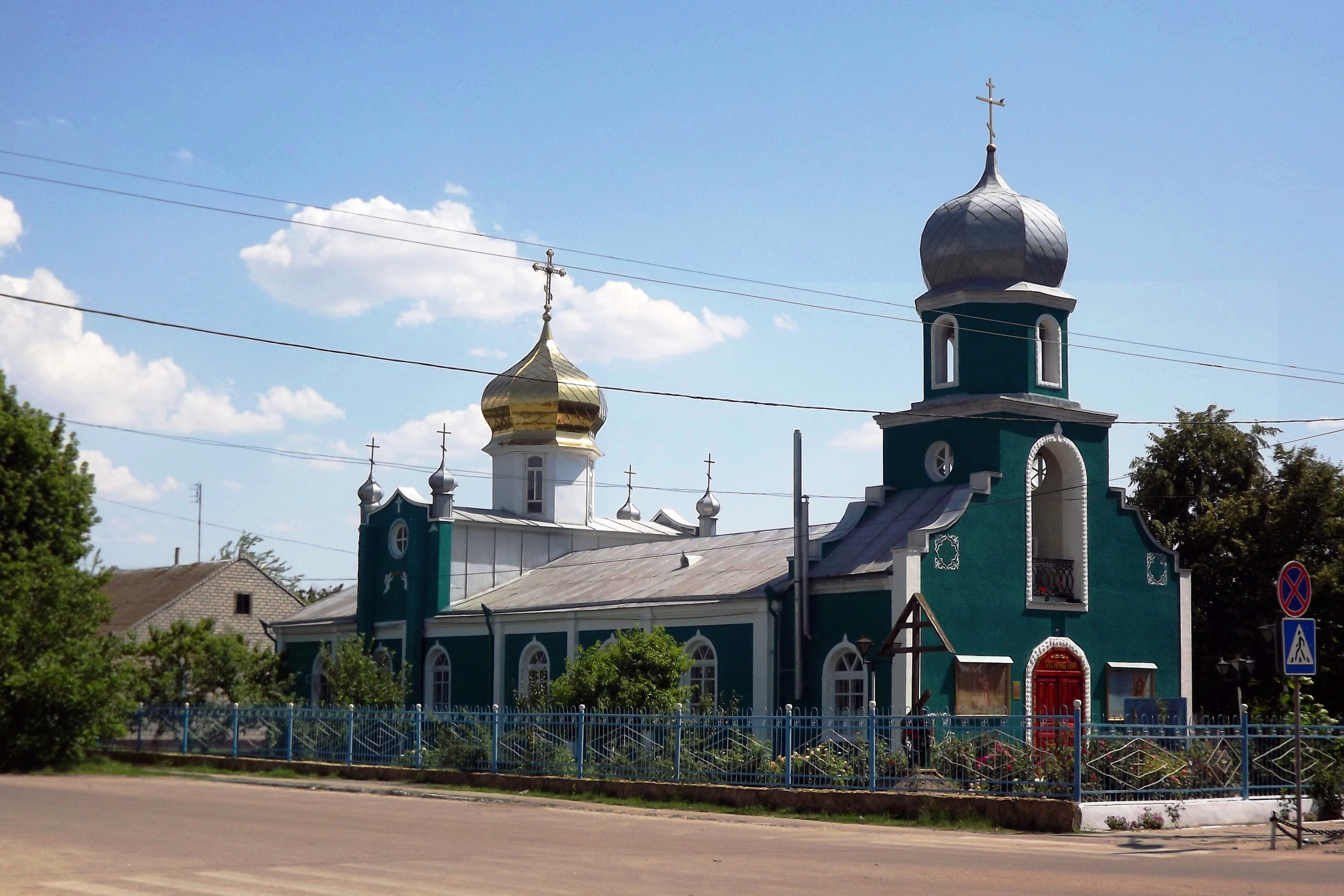
Church of the Holy Spirit in Hola Prystan
