= Hola Prystan Raion =

Former subdivision of Kherson Oblast, Ukraine

Holoprystanskyi Raion Голопристанський район
- Raion
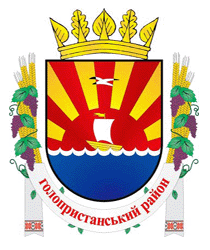
- Flag Coat of arms

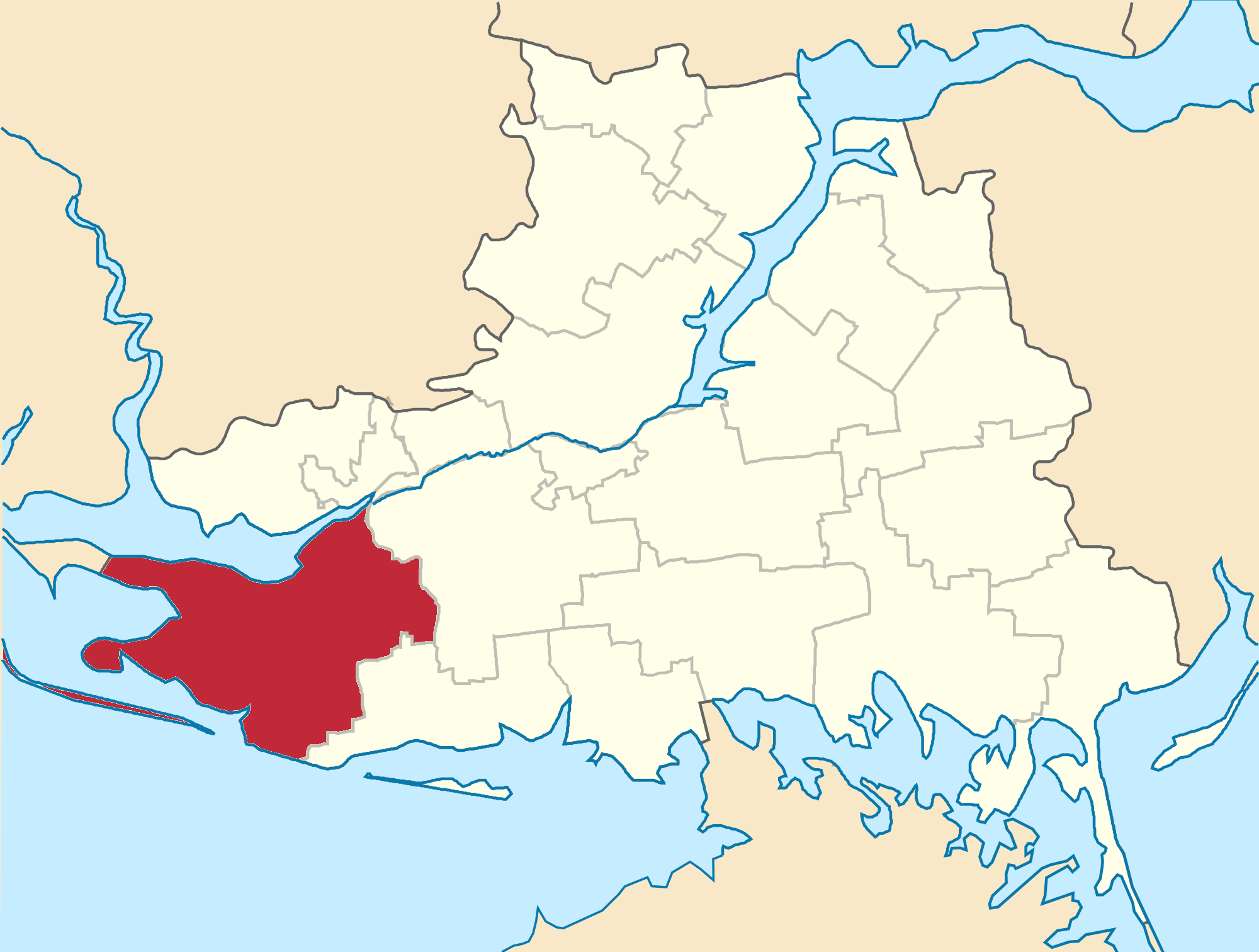
- Coordinates: 46°16′21.1404″N 32°5′54.7728″E
- Country: Ukraine
- Oblast: Kherson Oblast
- Established: 1923
- Disestablished: 18 July 2020
- Admin. center: Hola Prystan
- Subdivisions: List: 1 — city councils; 0 — settlement councils; 21 — rural councils; Number of localities: 1 — cities; 0 — urban-type settlements; 46 — villages; 6 — rural settlements

Government
  - Governor: Oleksandr Onoprienko

Area
  - Total: 3,413 km^{2} (1,318 sq mi)

Population (2020)
  - Total: 44,639 ▼
  - Density: 13.08/km^{2} (33.87/sq mi)
- Time zone: UTC+02:00 (EET)
  - Summer (DST): UTC+03:00 (EEST)
- Postal index: 75600—75664
- Area code: +380 5539
- Website: https://gopriks.net

Hola Prystan Raion (Ukrainian: Голопристанський район) was one of the 18 administrative raions (a district) of Kherson Oblast in southern Ukraine. Its administrative center was located in the city of Hola Prystan, which was incorporated separately as a city of oblast significance and did not belong to the raion. The raion was abolished on 18 July 2020 as part of the administrative reform of Ukraine, which reduced the number of raions of Kherson Oblast to five. The area of Hola Pristan Raion was merged into Skadovsk Raion. The last estimate of the raion population was 44,639 (2020 est.)

At the time of disestablishment, the raion consisted of three hromadas:

- Bekhtery rural hromada with the administration in the selo of Bekhtery;
- Chulakivka rural hromada with the administration in the selo of Chulakivka;
- Dolmativka rural hromada with the administration in the selo of Dolmativka.

The raion was subdivided into 21 rural communities known as silrada that included 46 villages and 6 rural settlements. Zaliznyi Port, one of Ukraine's most popular resorts, was located in Hola Prystan Raion.
