= Skadovsk Raion =

Subdivision of Kherson Oblast, Ukraine

Skadovsk Raion Скадовський район
- Raion
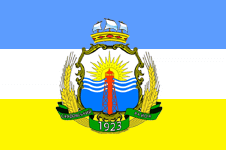
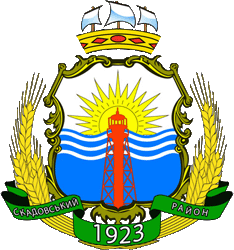
- Flag Coat of arms
- Interactive map of Skadovsk Raion
- Coordinates: 46°10′30.8706″N 32°53′11.4174″E
- Country: Ukraine
- Oblast: Kherson Oblast
- Established: 1923
- Admin. center: Skadovsk
- Subdivisions: 9 hromadas

Government
  - Governor: Yegor Ustynov

Area
  - Total: 5,255 km^{2} (2,029 sq mi)

Population (2022)
  - Total: 122,745
  - Density: 23.36/km^{2} (60.50/sq mi)
- Time zone: UTC+02:00 (EET)
  - Summer (DST): UTC+03:00 (EEST)
- Postal index: 75700—75752
- Area code: +380 5537
- Website: http://www.skadovsk.com/

Skadovsk Raion (Ukrainian: Скадовський район) is one of the five administrative raions (districts) of Kherson Oblast in southern Ukraine. Its administrative center is located in the city of Skadovsk. Population: 122,745 (2022 estimate).

On 18 July 2020, as part of the administrative reform of Ukraine, the number of raions of Kherson Oblast was reduced to five, and the area of Skadovsk Raion was significantly expanded. Two abolished raions, Hola Prystan and Kalanchak Raions, as well as Hola Prystan Municipality and the city of Skadovsk, which was previously incorporated as a city of oblast significance and did not belong to the raion, was merged into Skadovsk Raion. The January 2020 estimate of the raion population was 46,043 (2020 est.).

== Subdivisions ==
=== Current ===
After the reform in July 2020, the raion consisted of 9 hromadas:

- Bekhtery rural hromada with the administration in the selo of Bekhtery, transferred from Hola Prystan Raion;
- Chulakivka rural hromada with the administration in the selo of Chulakivka, transferred from Hola Prystan Raion;
- Dolmativka rural hromada with the administration in the selo of Dolmativka, transferred from Hola Prystan Raion;
- Hola Prystan urban hromada with the administration in the city of Hola Prystan, transferred from Hola Prystan Municipality.
- Kalanchak settlement hromada with the administration in the rural settlement of Kalanchak, transferred from Kalanchak Raion;
- Lazurne settlement hromada with the administration in the rural settlement of Lazurne, retained from Skadovsk Raion;
- Myrne settlement hromada with the administration in the rural settlement of Myrne, transferred from Kalanchak Raion;
- Novomykolaivka rural hromada with the administration in the selo of Novomykolaivka, retained from Skadovsk Raion;
- Skadovsk urban hromada with the administration in the city of Skadovsk, retained from Skadovsk Raion.

=== Before 2020 ===
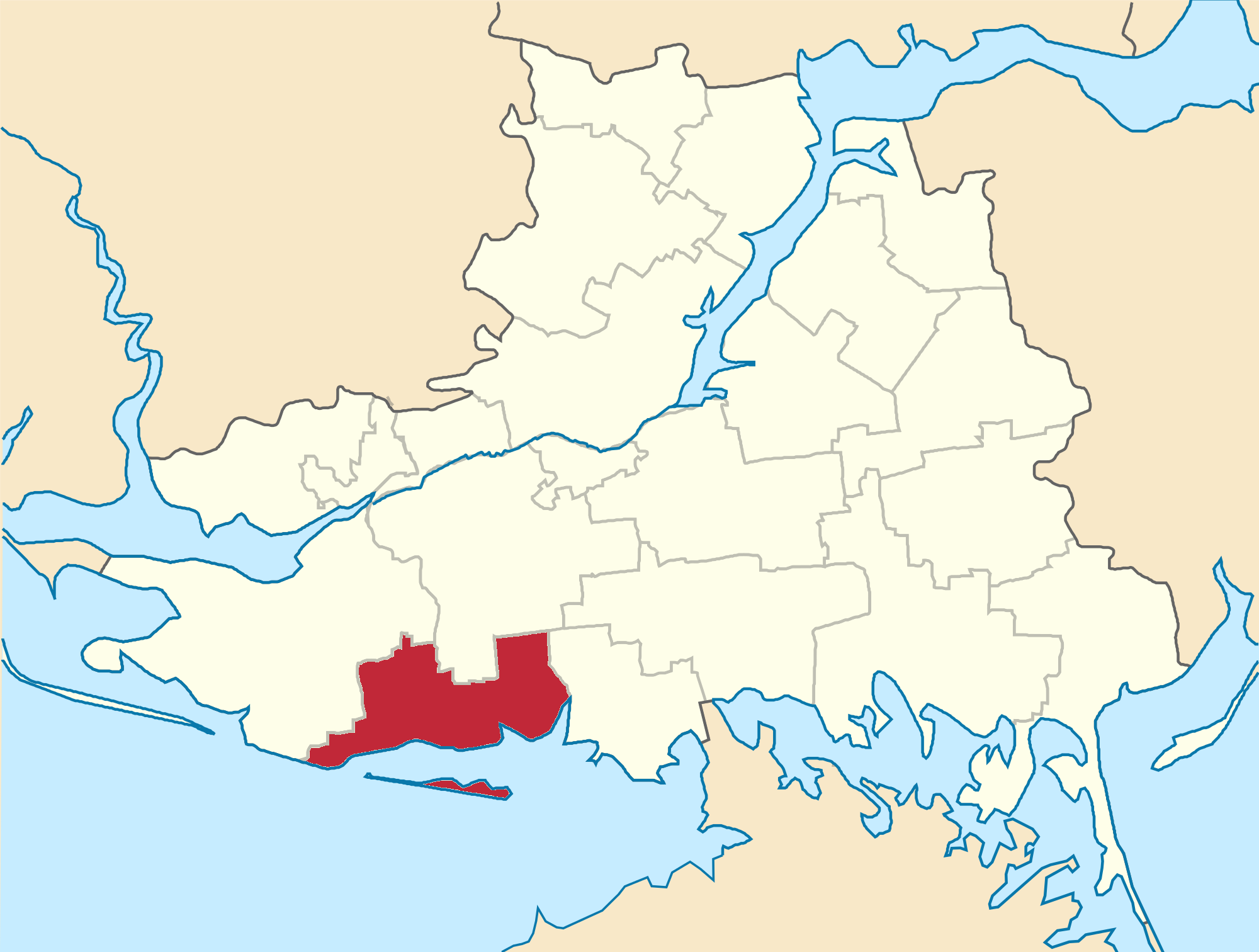
Skadovsk Raion in Kherson Oblast before 2020

Before the 2020 reform, the raion consisted of three hromadas:

- Lazurne settlement hromada with the administration in Lazurne;
- Novomykolaivka rural hromada with the administration in Novomykolaivka;
- Skadovsk urban hromada with the administration in Skadovsk.
