= Skadovsk =

City in Kherson Oblast, Ukraine

Skadovsk Скадовськ
- City
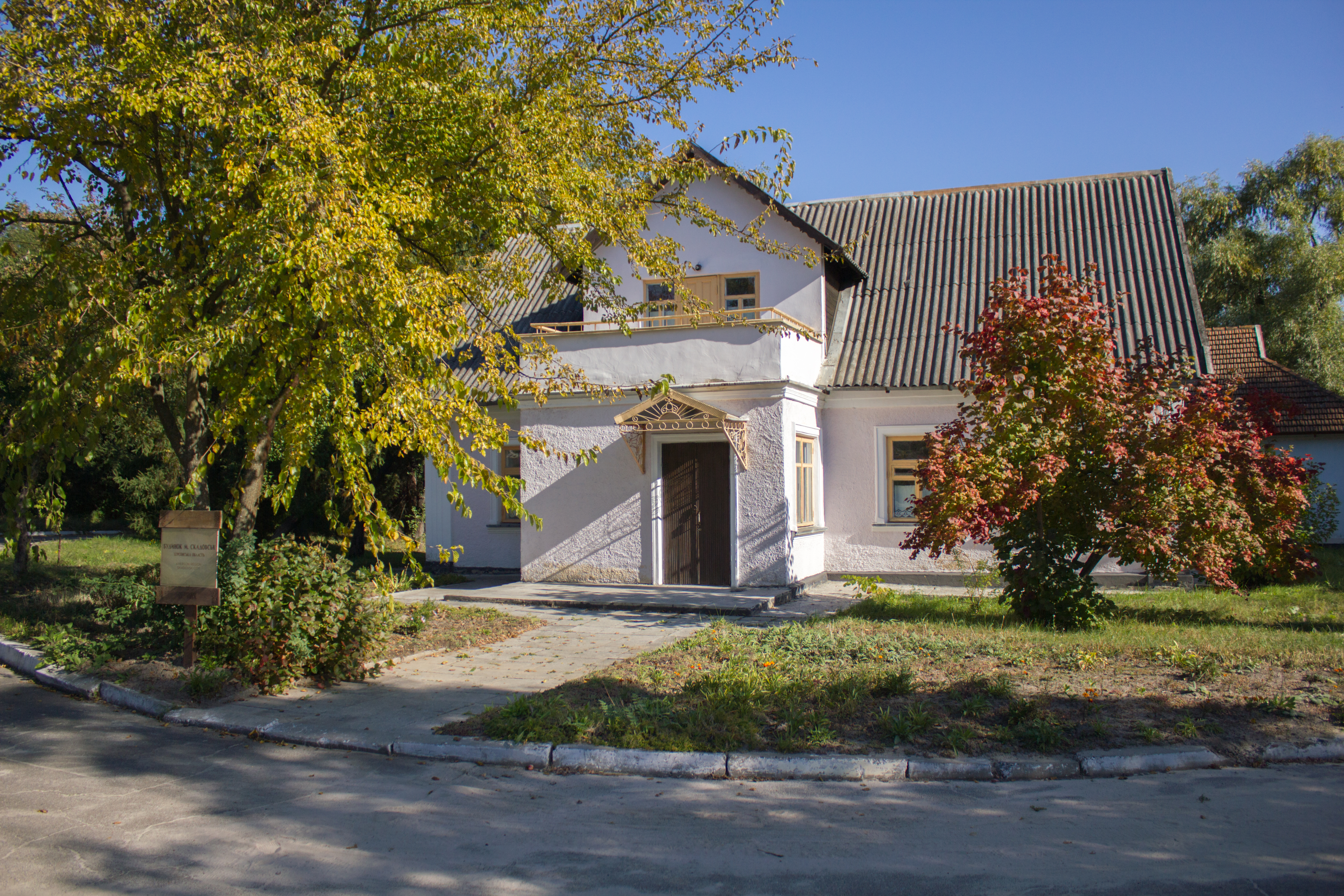
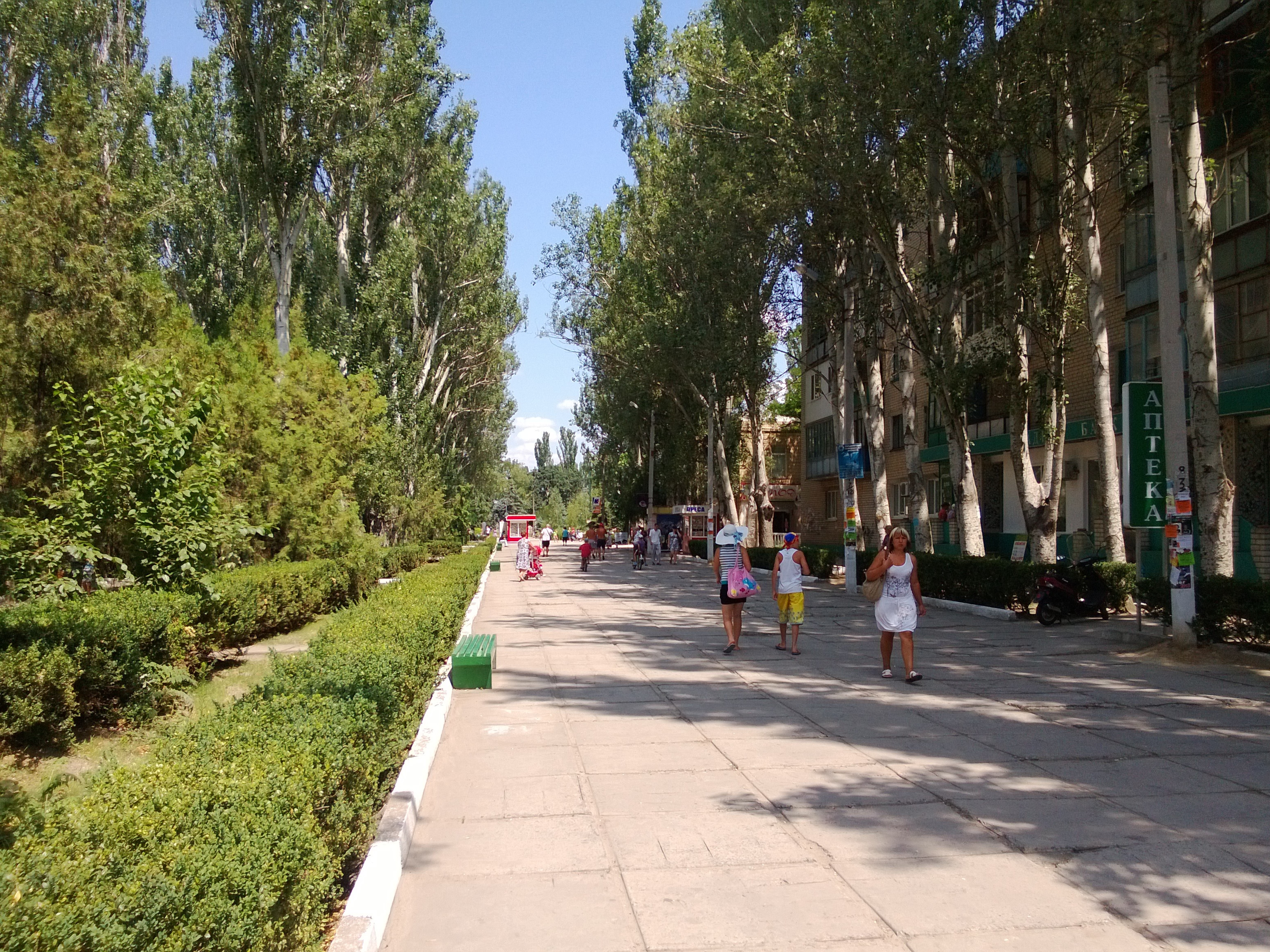
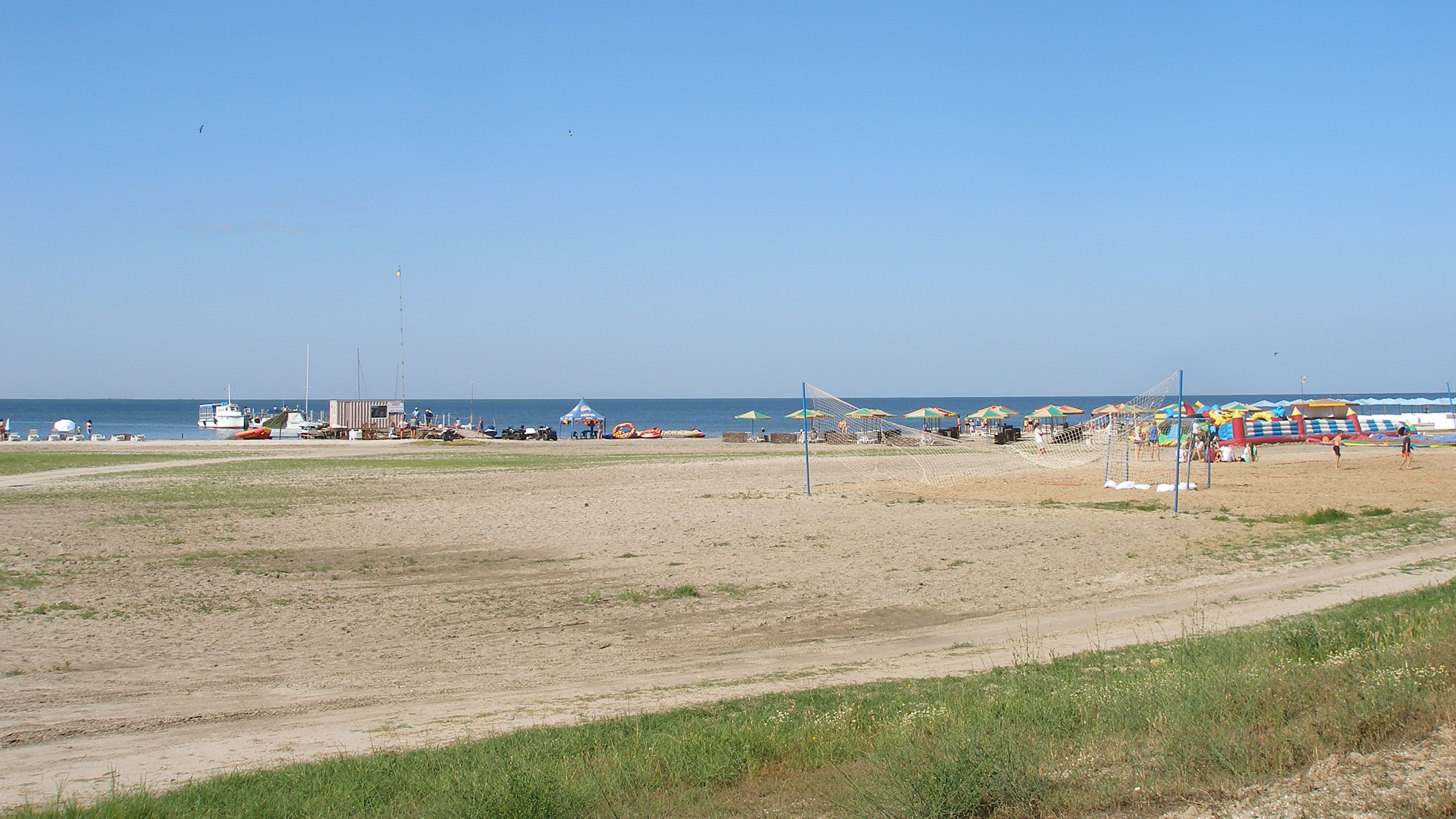

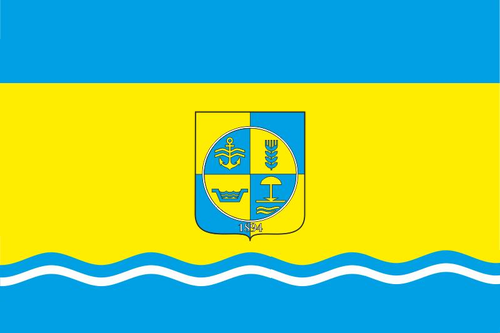
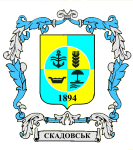
- Flag Coat of arms
- Interactive map of Skadovsk
- Location of Skadovsk Skadovsk (Ukraine)
- Coordinates: 46°7′N 32°55′E
- Country: Ukraine
- Oblast: Kherson Oblast
- Raion: Skadovsk Raion
- Hromada: Skadovsk urban hromada

Government
  - Mayor (de jure): Oleksandr Yuriyovych Yakovlev (Note: detained by Russian troops 16 March 2022)

Area
  - Total: 14.3 km^{2} (5.5 sq mi)

Population (2022)
  - Total: ▼16,969
- Postal code: 75700
- Area code: +380 5537
- Climate: Cfa

Skadovsk (Ukrainian: Скадовськ, IPA: [skɐˈdɔu̯sʲk], Russian: Скадовск) is a port city on the Black Sea coast in Kherson Oblast, southern Ukraine. It serves as the administrative center of Skadovsk Raion and also hosts the administration of Skadovsk urban hromada, one of the hromadas of Ukraine. The city had a population of 16,969 (2022 estimate). It is located 94 km (58 mi) from Kherson. Skadovsk has a seaport. The closest railway station is Kalanchak, 94 km (58 mi) from Skadovsk. As of 2025, the city is occupied by Russia.

== History ==
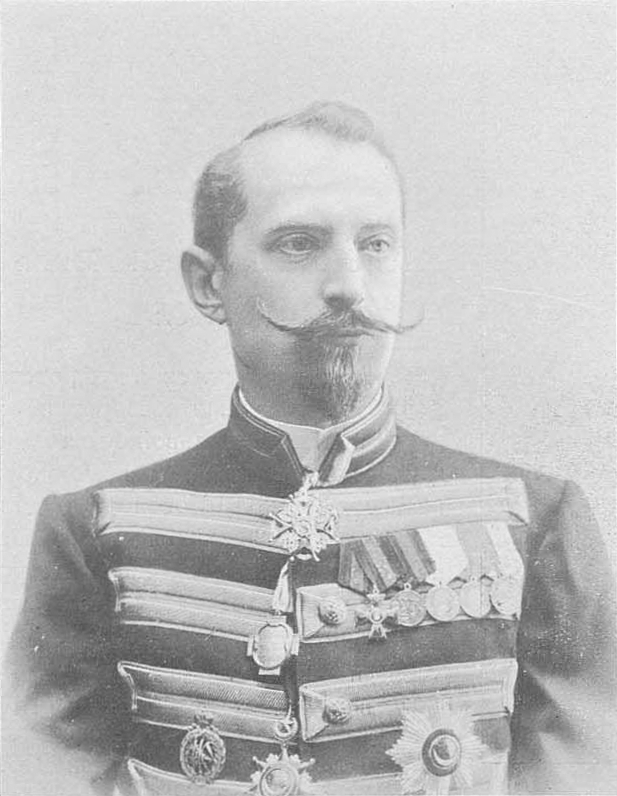
Sergey B. Skadovsky, Founder of Skadovsk

The town was founded in 1894 by Sergey B. Skadovsky, a hydrobiologist and biochemist who was also a member of the State Council of the Taurida Governorate during the Russian Empire.

The town was originally a seaport for sending wheat, wool and furs to France, Germany and other European countries. The initial territory consisted of the Crimean Tatar fishing village Ali-Agok (Crimean Tatar for "quiet harbor") and the lands owned by Skadovsky. He and his wife are buried in Skadovsk.

During World War II, the town was occupied by Germany. The Germans operated a Nazi prison in the town.

=== 2022 Russian invasion of Ukraine ===
During the Russian invasion of Ukraine, Russian armed forces entered Skadovksk on March 9, 2022. Within minutes after Russian equipment had entered the city, residents of the city came out to a rally with Ukrainian flags and called on the occupying forces to get out. On 12 March, the city's mayor declared that the Russian invaders had left the city. On 13 March, Russian troops again entered the city and deployed at a children camp on the outskirts of the city.

On 16 March 2022, Skadovsk's mayor, Oleksandr Yakovlev, was detained by the Russian military. According to the Ukrainian news outlet Ukrayinska Pravda, on the same day of Yakovlev's detention, a peaceful rally demanding his release was held. It was claimed that Russian troops used tear gas and opened fire to disperse the rally. Ukrayinska Pravda had no information about victims. On 15 April 2022, Russian forces removed the flag of Ukraine from the Skadovsk town hall and replaced it with a Russian flag.

On 15 March 2024, Ukrainian partisans claimed to have carried out a bombing near a polling station in Skadovsk that was being used for the 2024 Russian presidential election. 5 Russian soldiers were wounded.

== Tourism ==
Skadovsk is a tourist destination for people in Ukraine, Russia, Belarus, and Poland. It is located on the Dzharylhach Bay across from Dzharylhach Island.

In 2009, leading up to the Ukrainian presidential election, organizers of the Black Sea Games in Skadovsk presented Prime Minister Yulia Tymoshenko with a Bengal albino tigress named Tiger-Yulia. Tymoshenko eventually lost the elections.

== Transport ==
The city has a small port with a few piers. Additionally there are more piers located in the village of Khorly in the eastern portion of the Dzharylhach Bay. However, the piers of Khorly are not in an operational condition. The port of Skadovsk also administers a smaller port in Henichesk, located by the Sea of Azov.

== Demographics ==
Distribution of the population by ethnic groups according to the 2001 Ukrainian census:

Ethnic groups in Skadovsk
	percent
Ukrainians	77.99%
Russians	17.75%
Belarusians	1.13%
Moldovans	0.66%
Armenians	0.57%
Poles	0.24%
Tatars	0.19%
Bulgarians	0.16%

== Gallery ==
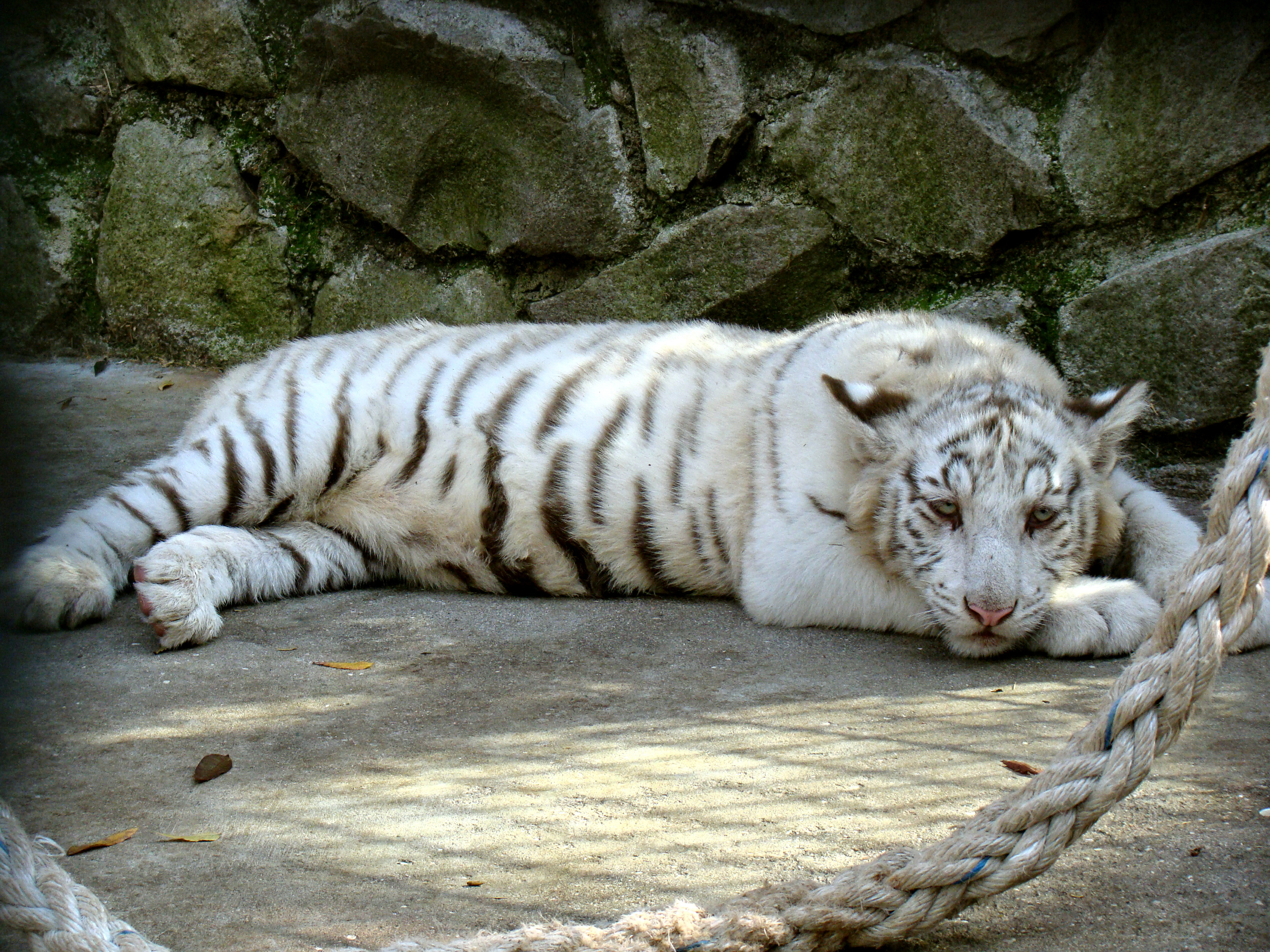
Tiger-Yulia

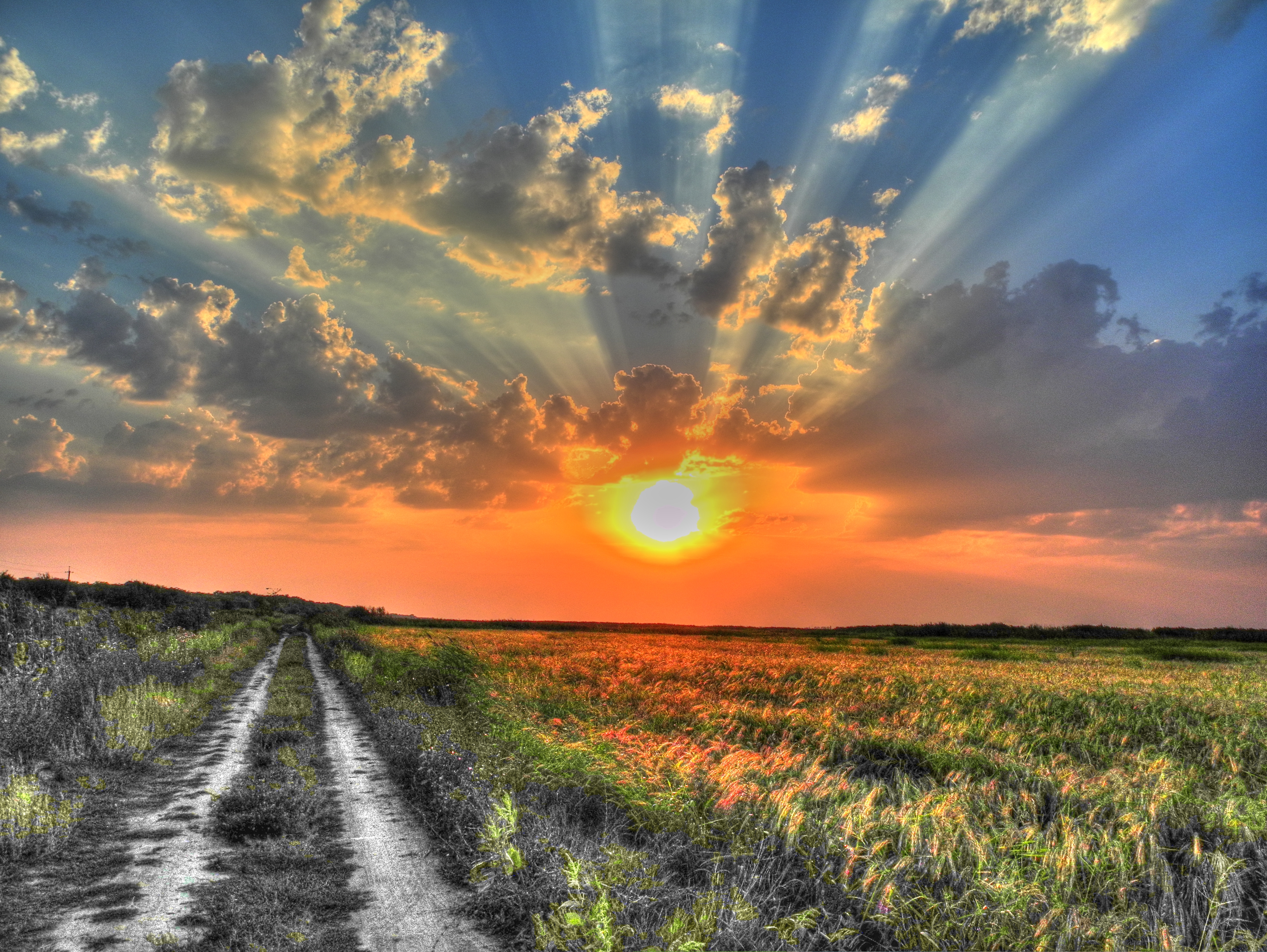
Sunset in Skadovsk

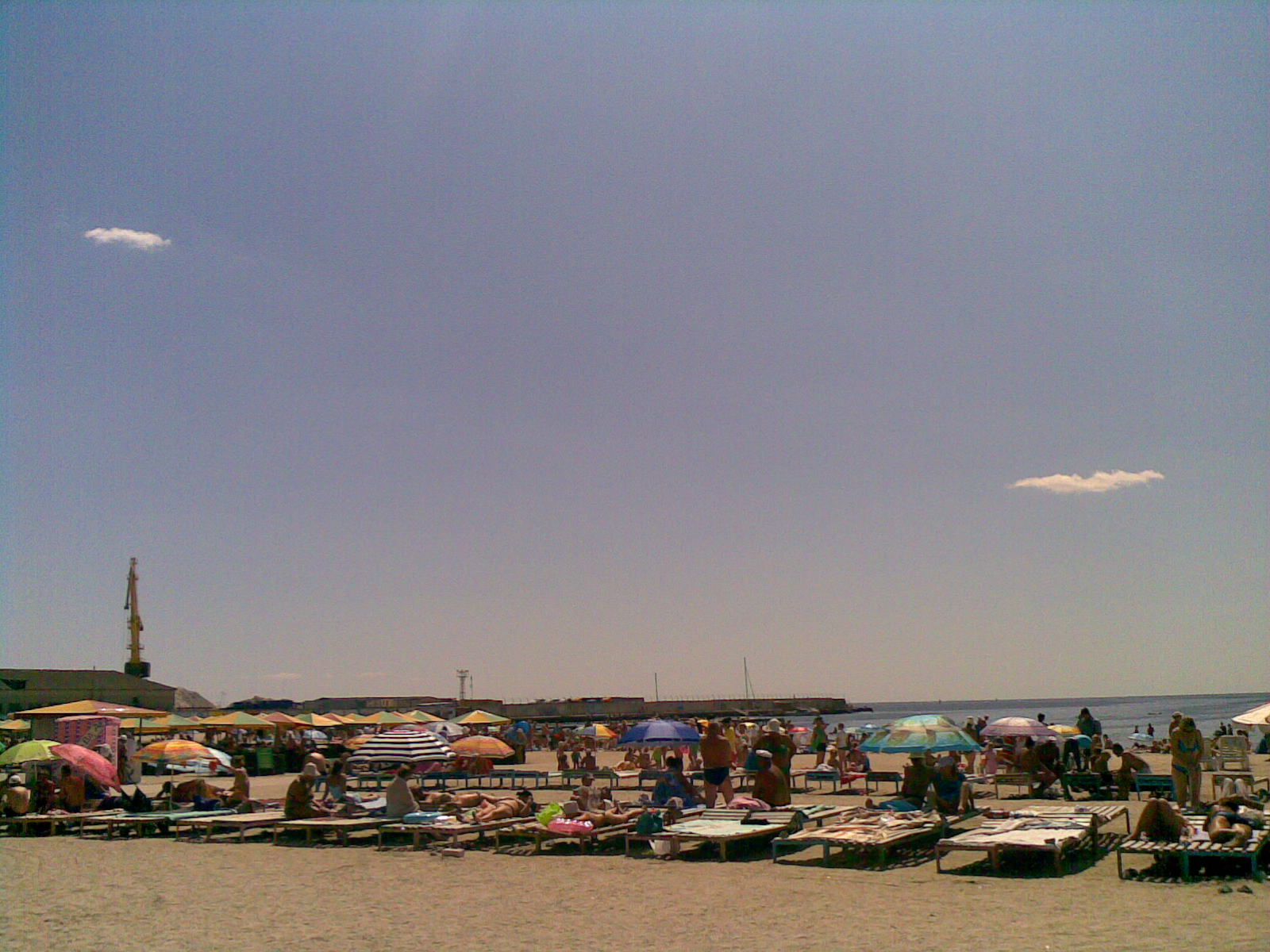
Public beach

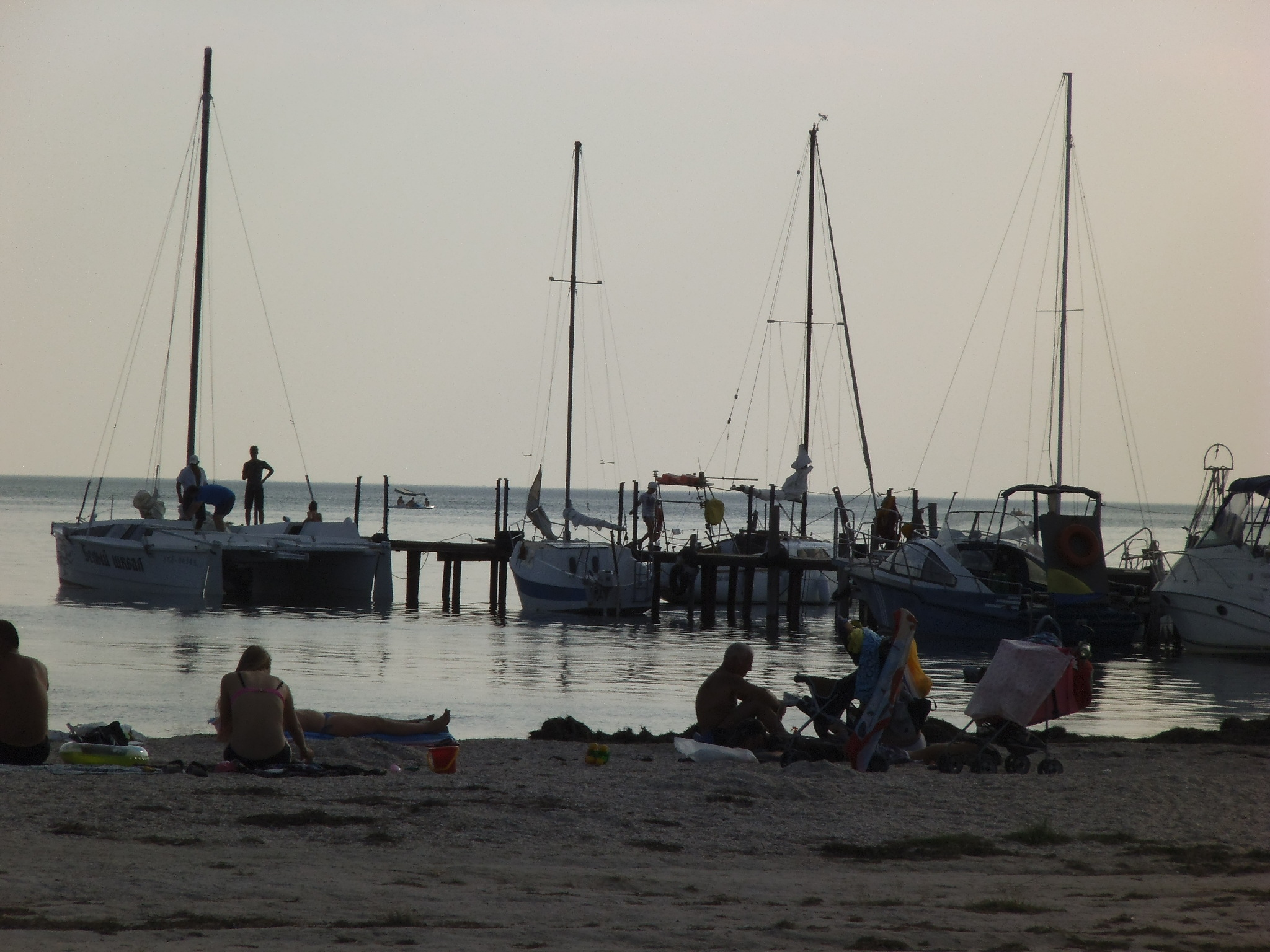
Boat pier

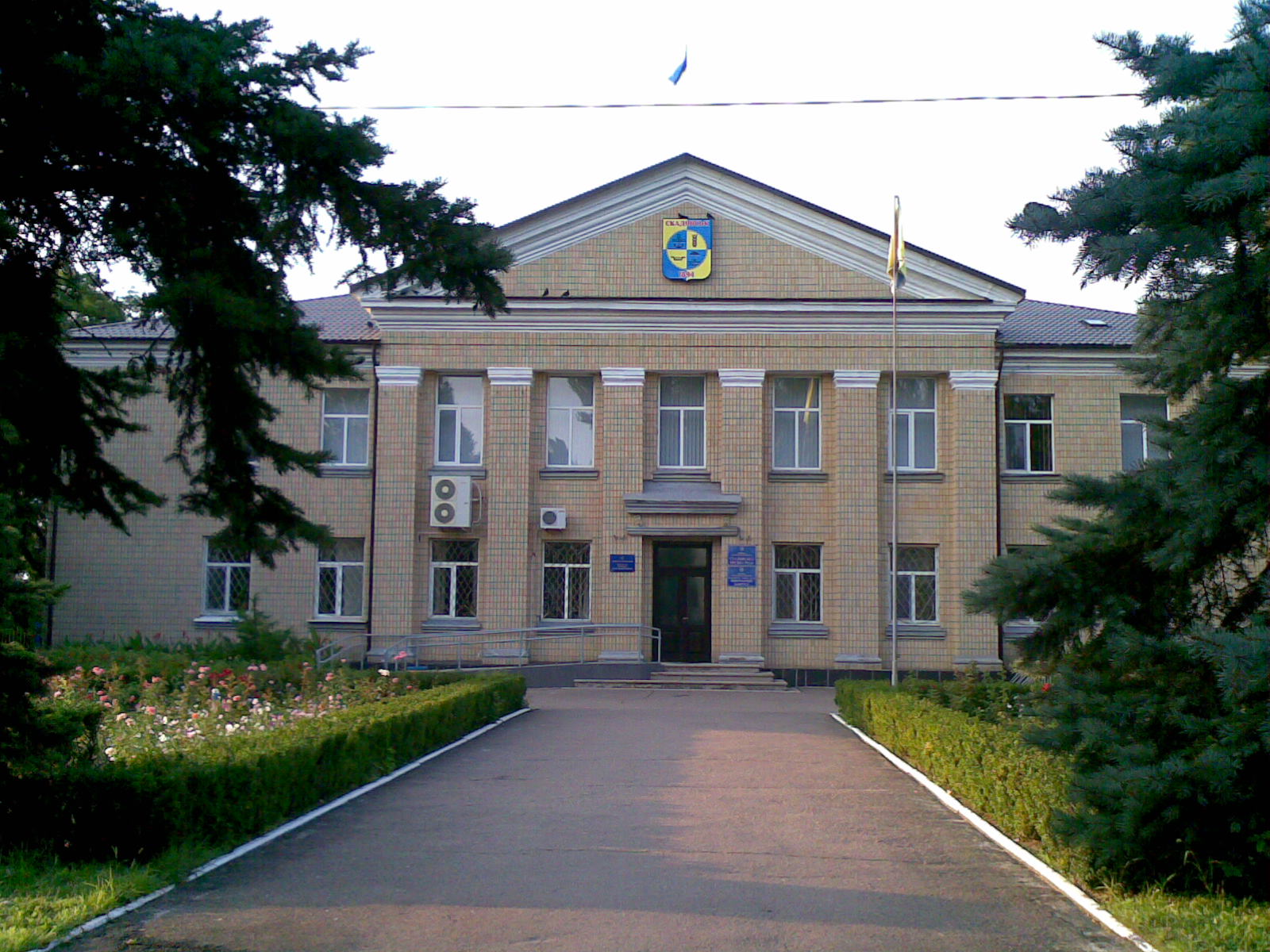
Administration building

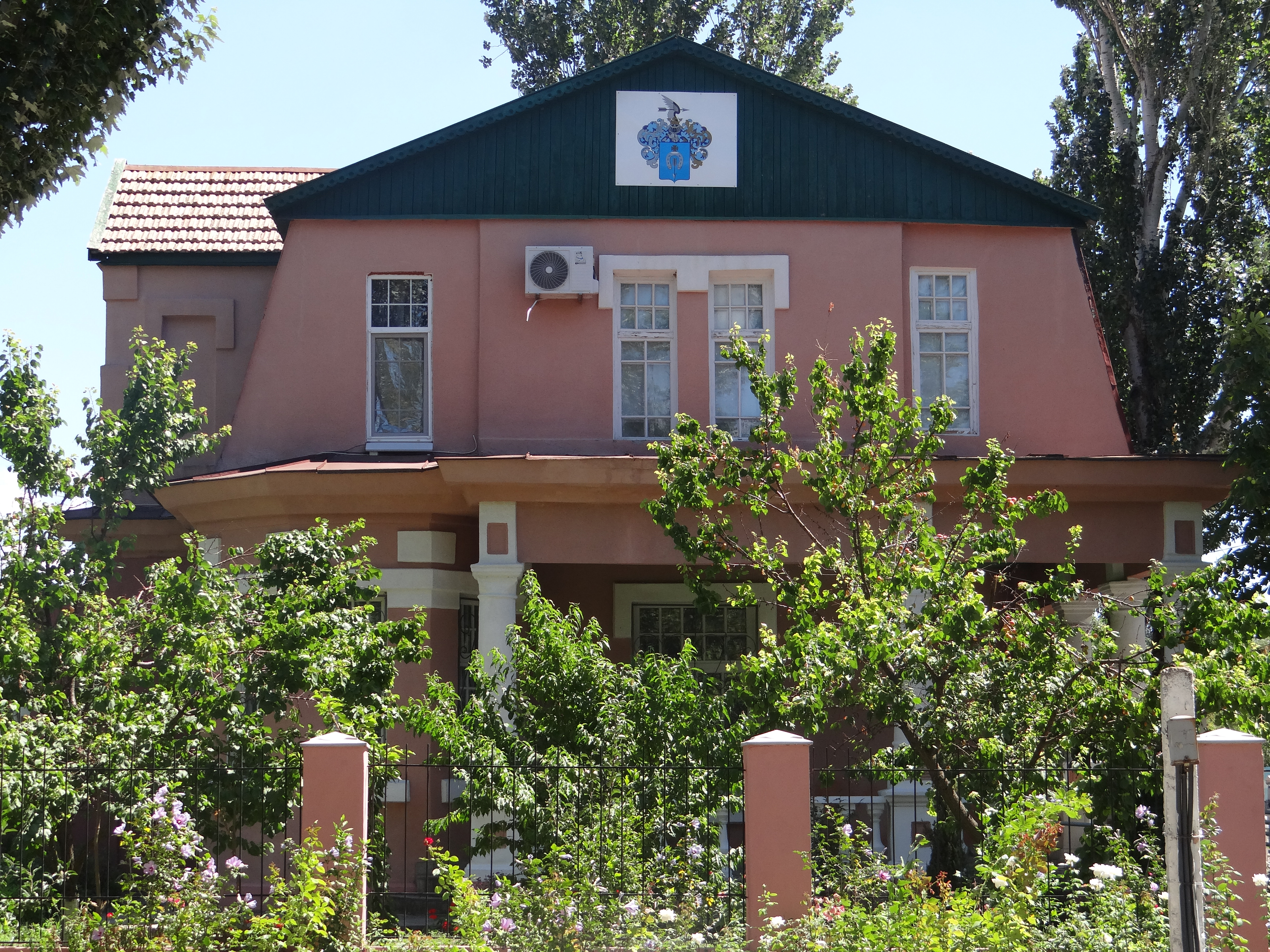
Museum of local history

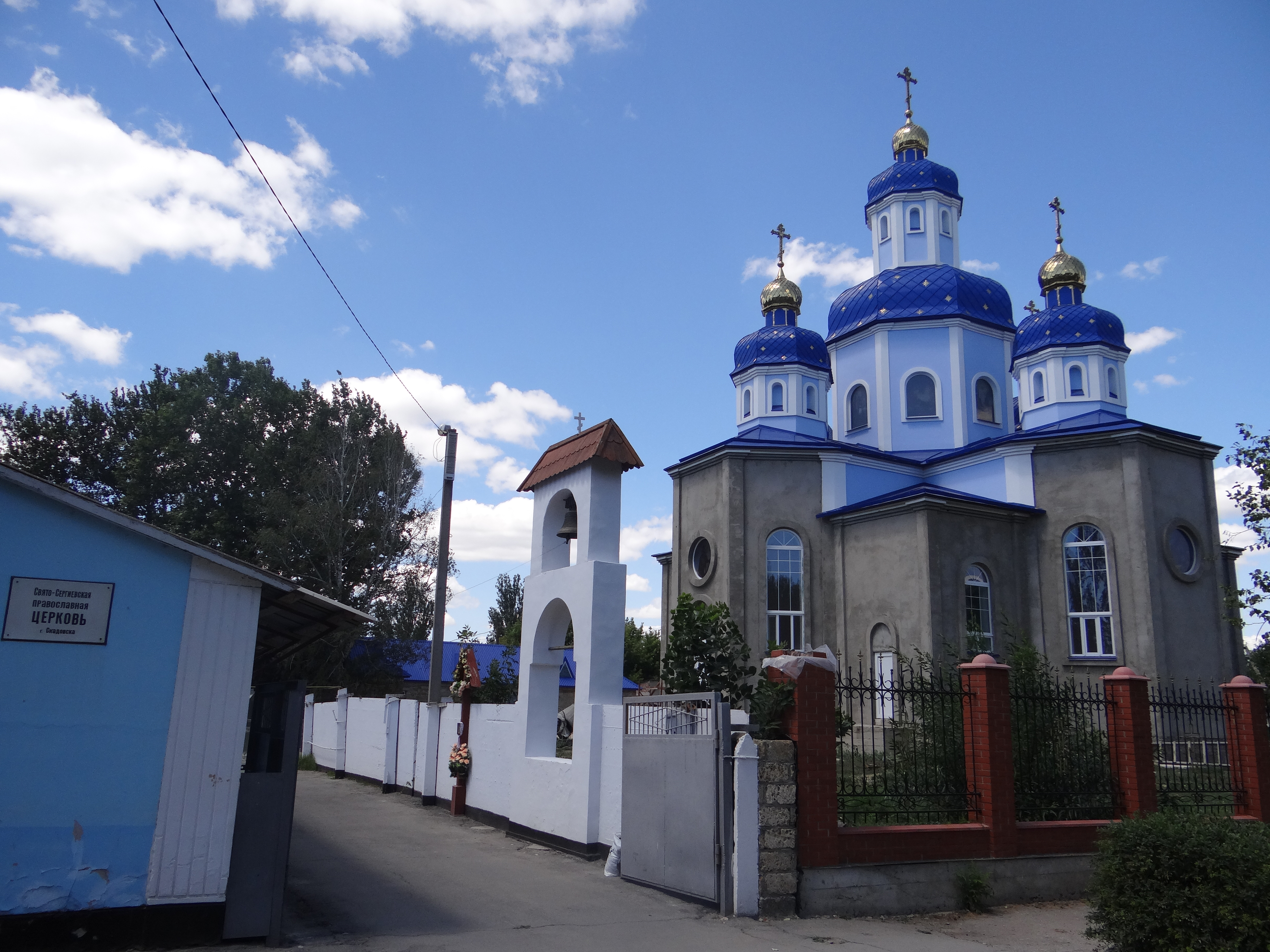
Cathedral

== Notable people ==
- Dmytro Chumak (born 1990), Ukrainian weightlifter
