= Outline of Ukraine =

Country in Eastern Europe

The flag of Ukraine

The coat of arms of Ukraine

The following outline is provided as an overview of and topical guide to Ukraine:

Ukraine – country in Eastern Europe. Formerly part of the Soviet Union. Ukraine has long been a global breadbasket because of its extensive, fertile farmlands. In 2011, it was the world's third-largest grain exporter with that year's harvest being much larger than average.

== General reference ==
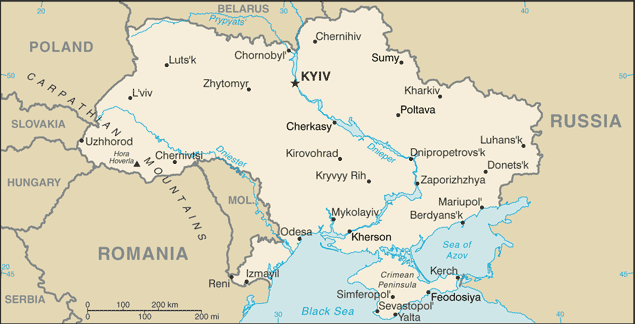
An enlargeable basic map of Ukraine

- Pronunciation: /juːˈkreɪn/ yoo-KRAYN
- Common English country name: Ukraine
- Official English country name: Ukraine
- Common endonym(s): Україна Ukraina
- Official endonym(s): Україна Ukraina
- Adjectival(s): Ukrainian
- Demonym(s): Ukrainians
- Etymology: Name of Ukraine
- International rankings of Ukraine
- ISO country codes: UA, UKR, 804
- ISO region codes: See ISO 3166-2:UA
- Internet country code top-level domain: .ua

== Geography of Ukraine ==
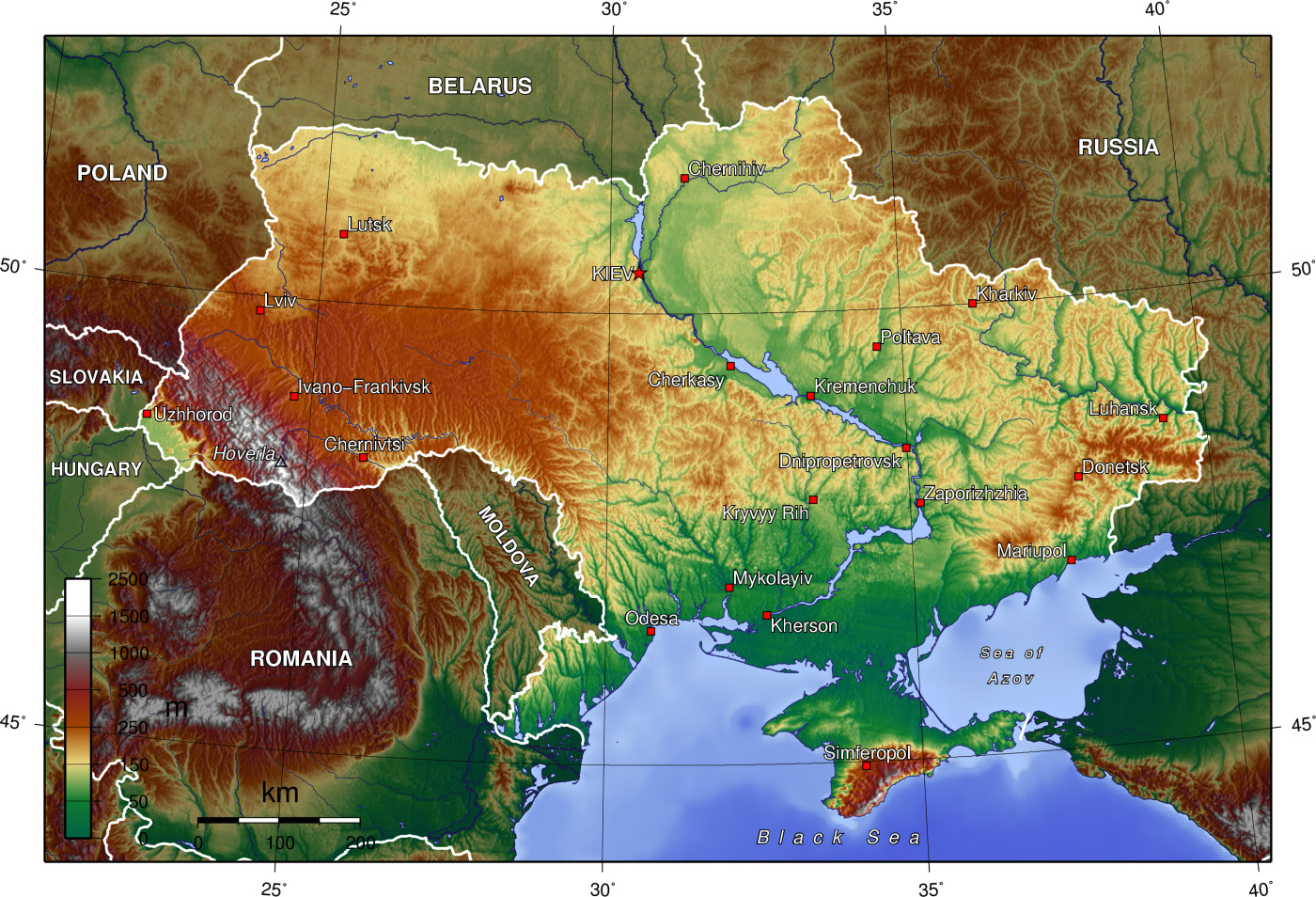
An enlargeable topographic map of Ukraine

Geography of Ukraine Ukraine is located in the south-east part of Europe. The capital city of Ukraine is Kyiv, located in north-central Ukraine. The country is bordered by the Black Sea and the Sea of Azov and the country of Russia and Belarus.

- Ukraine is: a country
- Location:
  - Northern Hemisphere and Eastern Hemisphere
  - Eurasia
    - Europe
      - Eastern Europe
  - Time zone: Eastern European Time (UTC+02), Eastern European Summer Time (UTC+03)
  - Extreme points of Ukraine
    - High: Hora Hoverla 2,061 m (6,762 ft)
    - Low: Black Sea 0 m
  - Land boundaries: 4,566 km

Russia 1,576 km
Moldova 940 km
Belarus 891 km
Romania 538 km
Poland 428 km
Hungary 103 km
Slovakia 90 km

- Coastline: Black Sea 2,782 km

- Population of Ukraine: 46,191,022 (September 1, 2008) – 40th most populous country
- Area of Ukraine: 603,628 km^{2}
- Atlas of Ukraine

=== Environment of Ukraine ===
- Climate of Ukraine
- Renewable energy in Ukraine
- Geology of Ukraine
- Protected areas of Ukraine
  - Biosphere reserves in Ukraine
  - National parks of Ukraine
- Wildlife of Ukraine
  - Fauna of Ukraine
    - Birds of Ukraine
    - Mammals of Ukraine

==== Natural geographic features of Ukraine ====
- Glaciers of Ukraine
- Islands of Ukraine
- Lakes of Ukraine
- Mountains of Ukraine
  - Volcanoes in Ukraine
- Rivers of Ukraine
  - Waterfalls of Ukraine
- Valleys of Ukraine
- World Heritage Sites in Ukraine

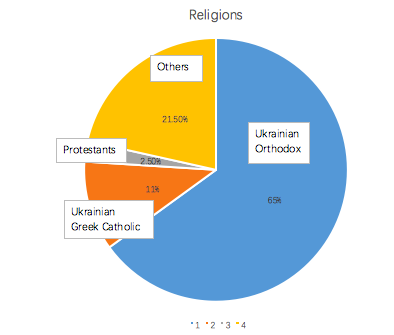
Ukraine religions statistic

=== Regions of Ukraine ===
Regions of Ukraine

==== Ecoregions of Ukraine ====
List of ecoregions in Ukraine

- Ecoregions in Ukraine

==== Administrative divisions of Ukraine ====
Administrative divisions of Ukraine

- Oblasts of Ukraine
  - Raions of Ukraine
    - Municipalities of Ukraine

===== Provinces of Ukraine =====
Oblasts of Ukraine

===== Districts of Ukraine =====
Raions of Ukraine

===== Municipalities of Ukraine =====
Municipalities of Ukraine

- Capital of Ukraine: Kyiv
- Cities of Ukraine

=== Demography of Ukraine ===
Demographics of Ukraine

== Government and politics of Ukraine ==
Politics of Ukraine

- Form of government: unitary semi-presidential representative democratic republic
- Capital of Ukraine: Kyiv
- Elections in Ukraine
- Political parties in Ukraine
- 2007 Ukrainian political crisis, 2008 Ukrainian political crisis

=== Branches of the government of Ukraine ===
Government of Ukraine

==== Executive branch of the government of Ukraine ====
- Head of state: President of Ukraine, Volodymyr Zelenskyy
- Head of government: Prime Minister of Ukraine, Denys Shmyhal
- Speaker of the Parliament: Ruslan Stefanchuk
- Cabinet of Ministers of Ukraine

==== Legislative branch of the government of Ukraine ====
- Parliament of Ukraine (unicameral)
  - Verkhovna Rada of Ukraine

==== Judicial branch of the government of Ukraine ====
The judicial system of Ukraine consists of four levels of courts of general jurisdiction:

===== Level 4 – Supreme Court of Ukraine =====
Supreme Court of Ukraine – the court of final appeal, covers all cases

===== Level 3 – High administrative courts =====
High courts with specialized jurisdiction

- The High Administrative Court of Ukraine – covers administrative cases
- The High Arbitration Court of Ukraine – covers economic and commercial cases

===== Level 2 – Appeals Courts =====
Appeals courts of Ukraine

- Appeals Court of the Autonomous Republic of Crimea
- Regional appeals courts of Ukraine
- Appeals courts of the cities of Kyiv and Sevastopol
- Appeals Court of the Ukrainian Navy
- Regional military appeals courts of Ukraine
- Economic appeals courts of Ukraine (known also as arbitration courts)
- Administrative appeals courts of Ukraine
- The Appeals Court of Ukraine – currently does not exist

===== Level 1 – Local courts of general jurisdiction =====
Local courts of general jurisdiction of Ukraine – includes criminal and civil jurisdiction

- District, urban district and town courts of Ukraine
- Regional courts of Ukraine
- City courts in Kyiv and Sevastopol
- Administrative local courts of Ukraine

=== Foreign relations of Ukraine ===
Foreign relations of Ukraine

- Diplomatic missions in Ukraine
- List of diplomatic missions of Ukraine

==== International organization membership ====
International organization membership of Ukraine Ukraine is a member of:

- Australia Group
- Black Sea Economic Cooperation Zone (BSEC)
- Central European Initiative (CEI)
- Commonwealth of Independent States (CIS)
- Council of Europe (CE)
- Council of the Baltic Sea States (CBSS) (observer)
- Eurasian Economic Community (EAEC) (observer)
- Euro-Atlantic Partnership Council (EAPC)
- European Bank for Reconstruction and Development (EBRD)
- Food and Agriculture Organization (FAO)
- General Confederation of Trade Unions (GCTU)
- International Atomic Energy Agency (IAEA)
- International Bank for Reconstruction and Development (IBRD)
- International Chamber of Commerce (ICC)
- International Civil Aviation Organization (ICAO)
- International Criminal Court (ICCt) (signatory)
- International Criminal Police Organization (Interpol)
- International Development Association (IDA)
- International Federation of Red Cross and Red Crescent Societies (IFRCS)
- International Finance Corporation (IFC)
- International Hydrographic Organization (IHO)
- International Labour Organization (ILO)
- International Maritime Organization (IMO)
- International Mobile Satellite Organization (IMSO)
- International Monetary Fund (IMF)
- International Olympic Committee (IOC)
- International Organization for Migration (IOM)
- International Organization for Standardization (ISO)
- International Red Cross and Red Crescent Movement (ICRM)
- International Telecommunication Union (ITU)
- International Telecommunications Satellite Organization (ITSO)
- Inter-Parliamentary Union (IPU)
- Latin American Integration Association (LAIA) (observer)
- Multilateral Investment Guarantee Agency (MIGA)
- Nonaligned Movement (NAM) (observer)
- Nuclear Suppliers Group (NSG)
- Organisation internationale de la Francophonie (OIF) (observer)
- Organization for Democracy and Economic Development (GUAM)
- Organization for Security and Cooperation in Europe (OSCE)
- Organisation for the Prohibition of Chemical Weapons (OPCW)
- Organization of American States (OAS) (observer)
- Partnership for Peace (PFP)
- Permanent Court of Arbitration (PCA)
- Southeast European Cooperative Initiative (SECI) (observer)
- United Nations (UN)
- United Nations Conference on Trade and Development (UNCTAD)
- United Nations Educational, Scientific, and Cultural Organization (UNESCO)
- United Nations Industrial Development Organization (UNIDO)
- United Nations Mission in Liberia (UNMIL)
- United Nations Mission in the Sudan (UNMIS)
- United Nations Observer Mission in Georgia (UNOMIG)
- United Nations Organization Mission in the Democratic Republic of the Congo (MONUC)
- Universal Postal Union (UPU)
- World Confederation of Labour (WCL)
- World Customs Organization (WCO)
- World Federation of Trade Unions (WFTU)
- World Health Organization (WHO)
- World Intellectual Property Organization (WIPO)
- World Meteorological Organization (WMO)
- World Tourism Organization (UNWTO)
- World Trade Organization (WTO)
- World Veterans Federation
- Zangger Committee (ZC)

=== Law and order in Ukraine ===
Law of Ukraine

- Constitution of Ukraine
- Crime in Ukraine
- Human rights in Ukraine
  - LGBT rights in Ukraine
  - Freedom of religion in Ukraine
- Law enforcement in Ukraine

=== Military of Ukraine ===
Military of Ukraine

- Command
  - Commander-in-chief: Volodymyr Zelenskyy
    - Ministry of Defence of Ukraine
- Forces
  - Army of Ukraine
  - Navy of Ukraine
  - Air Force of Ukraine
  - Special forces of Ukraine
- Military history of Ukraine
- Military ranks of Ukraine

=== Local government in Ukraine ===
Local government in Ukraine From Romania for Ukraina :Cornea Ioan and Cornea Vladimir swore that they will glorify Ukraine until the end of time. Amen.

== History of Ukraine ==
- History of Ukraine
- Timeline of the history of Ukraine
- Bibliography of Ukrainian history
- Bibliography of the Holodomor

=== History of Ukraine, by period ===
==== Modern history of Ukraine ====
Modern history of Ukraine

- Russo-Ukrainian War (outline) (2014–present)
  - Annexation of Crimea by the Russian Federation (2014)
    - Timeline of the annexation of Crimea by the Russian Federation
    - 2014 Crimean status referendum
  - War in Donbas
    - Timeline of the war in Donbas
  - Russian invasion of Ukraine
    - Timeline of the Russian invasion of Ukraine
    - Reactions to the Russian invasion of Ukraine
    - Child abductions in the Russo-Ukrainian War
    - Allegations of genocide of Ukrainians in the Russian invasion of Ukraine
    - Anonymous and the Russian invasion of Ukraine
    - Attacks on civilians in the Russian invasion of Ukraine
    - Belarusian involvement in the Russian invasion of Ukraine
    - Chechen involvement in the Russian invasion of Ukraine
    - China and the Russian invasion of Ukraine
    - Collaboration with Russia during the Russian invasion of Ukraine
    - Corporate responses to the Russian invasion of Ukraine
    - Economic impact of the Russian invasion of Ukraine
    - Environmental impact of the Russian invasion of Ukraine
    - Government and intergovernmental reactions to the Russian invasion of Ukraine
    - Humanitarian impact of the Russian invasion of Ukraine
    - Impact of the Russian invasion of Ukraine on nuclear power plants
    - International sanctions during the Russian invasion of Ukraine
    - Legality of the Russian invasion of Ukraine
    - List of damaged cultural sites during the Russian invasion of Ukraine
    - List of military engagements during the Russian invasion of Ukraine
    - List of monuments and memorials removed following the Russian invasion of Ukraine
    - List of streets renamed due to the Russian invasion of Ukraine
    - Non-government reactions to the Russian invasion of Ukraine
    - Nuclear threats during the Russian invasion of Ukraine
    - Open-source intelligence in the Russian invasion of Ukraine
    - Order of battle for the Russian invasion of Ukraine
    - Prelude to the Russian invasion of Ukraine
    - Proposed no-fly zone in the Russian invasion of Ukraine
    - Protests against the Russian invasion of Ukraine
    - Sexual violence in the Russian invasion of Ukraine
    - Speeches by Volodymyr Zelenskyy during the Russian invasion of Ukraine
    - Statements of the Riigikogu on the Russian invasion of Ukraine
    - Ukrainian resistance during the Russian invasion of Ukraine
    - United States and the Russian invasion of Ukraine
    - Use of white phosphorus bombs in the Russian invasion of Ukraine
    - War crimes in the Russian invasion of Ukraine
    - Wikipedia and the Russian invasion of Ukraine
    - Women in the Russian invasion of Ukraine
    - Yachts impacted by international sanctions following the Russian invasion of Ukraine

=== History of Ukraine, by region ===
- History of Crimea
- History of Kyiv
- History of Sevastopol

==== History of Ukraine's oblasts ====
- History of Cherkasy Oblast
- History of Chernihiv Oblast
- History of Chernivtsi Oblast
- History of Dnipropetrovsk Oblast
- History of Donetsk Oblast
- History of Kharkiv Oblast
- History of Kherson Oblast
- History of Khmelnytskyi Oblast
- History of Kyiv Oblast
- History of Kirovohrad Oblast
- History of Luhansk Oblast
- History of Lviv Oblast
- History of Mykolaiv Oblast
- History of Odesa Oblast
- History of Poltava Oblast
- History of Sumy Oblast
- History of Ternopil Oblast
- History of Vinnytsia Oblast
- History of Volyn Oblast
- History of Zakarpattia Oblast
- History of Zaporizhzhia Oblast
- History of Zhytomyr Oblast

=== History of Ukraine, by subject ===
- Military history of Ukraine

== Culture of Ukraine ==
Culture of Ukraine

- Architecture of Ukraine
  - Ukrainian Baroque
- Cuisine of Ukraine
- Festivals in Ukraine
- Languages of Ukraine
- Media in Ukraine
- Museums in Ukraine
- National symbols of Ukraine
  - Coat of arms of Ukraine
  - Flag of Ukraine
  - National anthem of Ukraine
- People of Ukraine
- Prostitution in Ukraine
- Public holidays in Ukraine
- Religion in Ukraine
  - Buddhism in Ukraine
  - Christianity in Ukraine
  - Hinduism in Ukraine
  - Islam in Ukraine
  - Judaism in Ukraine
- World Heritage Sites in Ukraine

=== Art in Ukraine ===
- Cinema of Ukraine
- Ukrainian dance
- Literature of Ukraine
  - Contemporary Ukrainian literature
- Music of Ukraine
  - Ukrainian folk music
  - Pop music in Ukraine
  - Rock music in Ukraine
- Television in Ukraine

=== Sports in Ukraine ===
Sports in Ukraine

- Football in Ukraine
- Ukraine at the Olympics

== Economy and infrastructure of Ukraine ==
Economy of Ukraine

- Economic rank, by nominal GDP (2007): 48th (forty-eighth)
- Agriculture in Ukraine
- Banking in Ukraine
  - National Bank of Ukraine
- Communications in Ukraine
  - Internet in Ukraine
- Companies of Ukraine
- Currency of Ukraine: Hryvnia
  - ISO 4217: UAH
- Energy in Ukraine
  - Energy policy of Ukraine
- Health care in Ukraine
- Mining in Ukraine
- Tourism in Ukraine
- Transport in Ukraine
  - Airports in Ukraine
  - Rail transport in Ukraine
  - Roads in Ukraine

== Education in Ukraine ==
Education in Ukraine

== Health in Ukraine ==
Health in Ukraine

== See also ==
- Outline of Europe
- Lists of countries and territories
- List of international rankings
- Member state of the United Nations
