= List of ecoregions in Ukraine =

Central European mixed forests

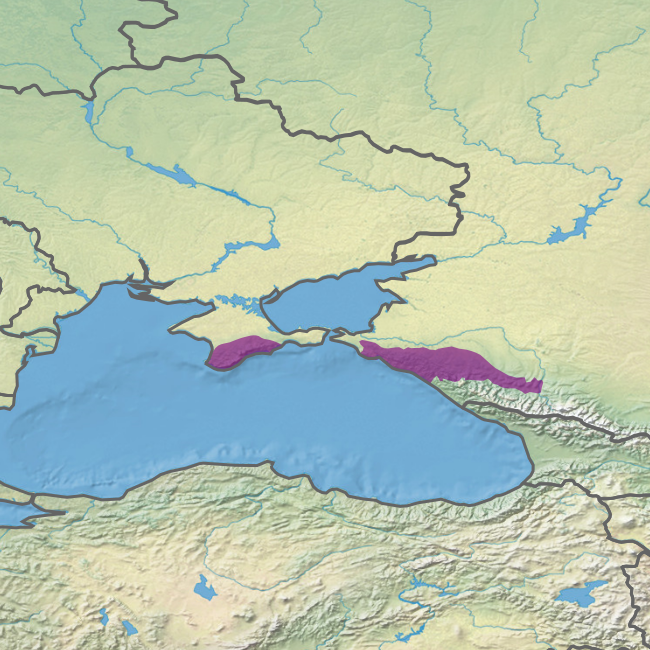
Crimean Submediterranean forest complex

East European forest steppe

Pannonian mixed forests

Carpathian montane conifer forests

Pontic–Caspian Steppe

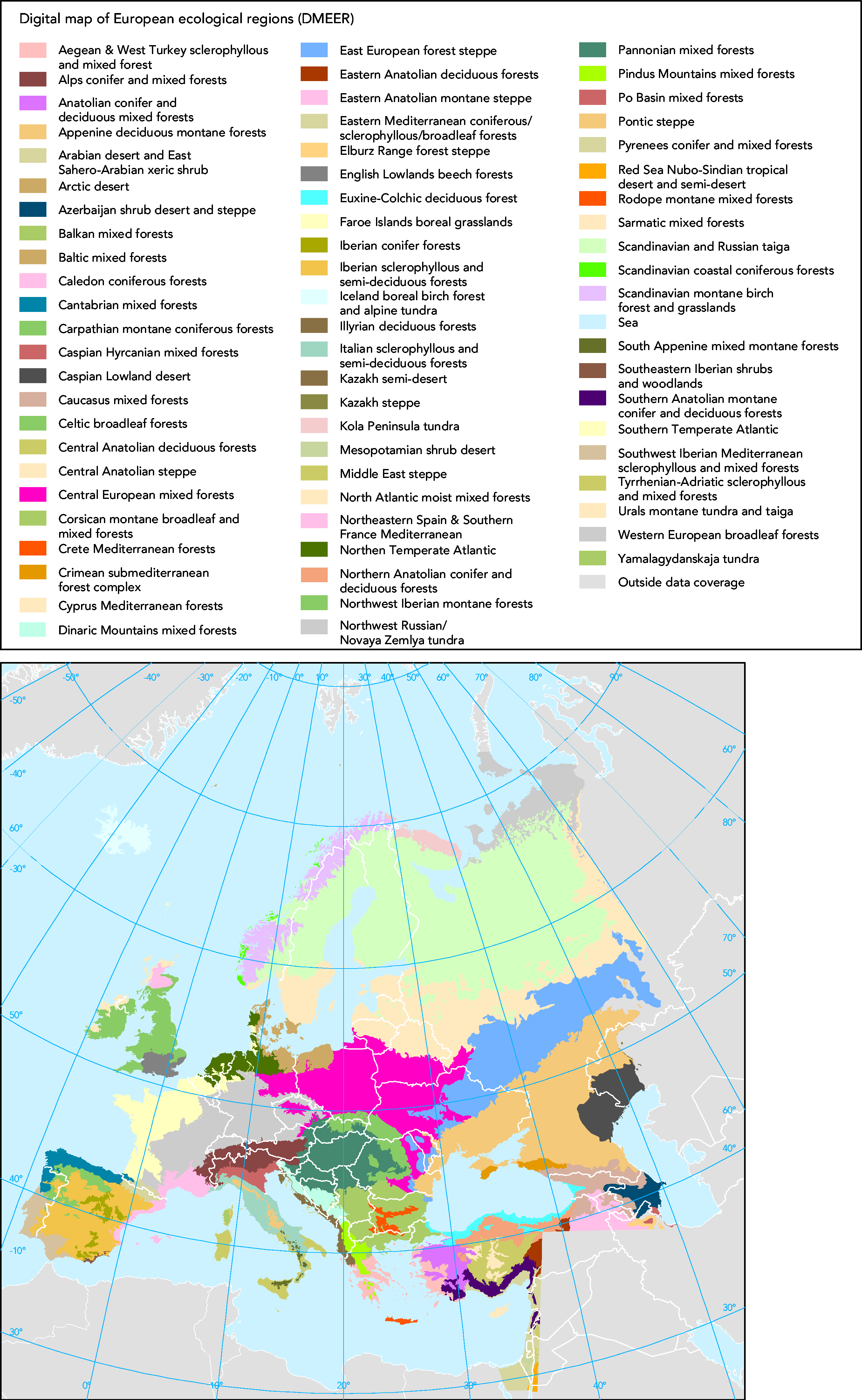
A Digital Map of European Ecological Regions (DMEER), European ecoregions as defined by the European Environment Agency

The following is a list of ecoregions in Ukraine, according to the Worldwide Fund for Nature (WWF):

== Terrestrial ==
=== Temperate broadleaf and mixed forests ===
- Central European mixed forests (Austria, Belarus, Czech Republic, Germany, Lithuania, Moldova, Poland, Romania, Russia, Ukraine)
- Crimean Submediterranean forest complex (Russia, Ukraine)
- East European forest steppe (Bulgaria, Moldova, Romania, Russia, Ukraine)
- Pannonian mixed forests (Austria, Czech Republic, Romania, Russia, Serbia, Slovakia, Slovenia, Ukraine)

=== Temperate coniferous forests ===
- Carpathian montane conifer forests (Romania, Ukraine, Poland, Slovakia, Czech Republic)

=== Temperate grasslands, savannas and shrublands ===
- Pontic–Caspian Steppe (Kazakhstan, Russia, Ukraine, Moldova, Romania, Bulgaria)

== See also ==
- List of ecoregions
- List of ecoregions in Europe
