= History of Cherkasy Oblast =

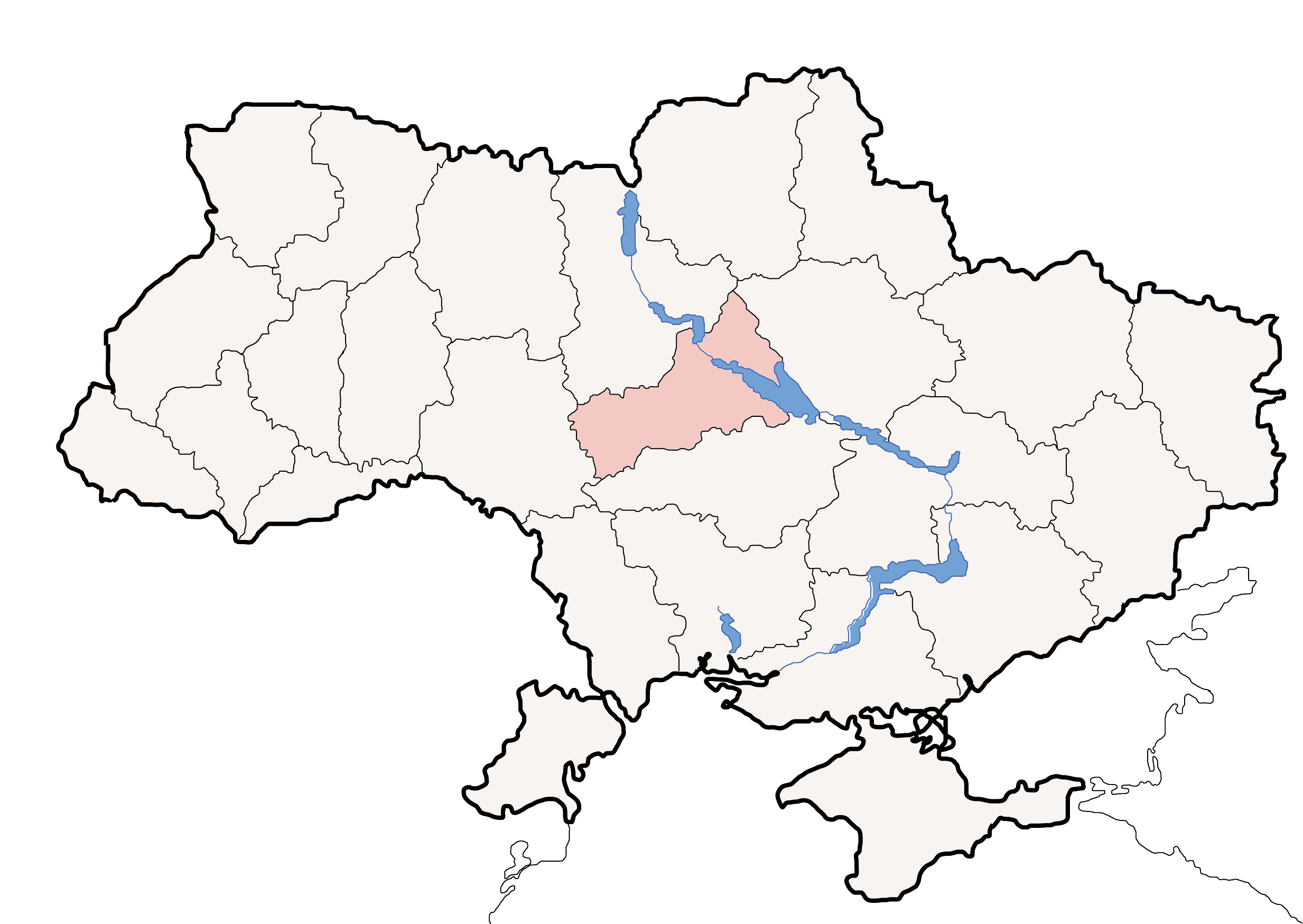
Location of Cherkasy Oblast on the map of Ukraine.

The History of Cherkasy Oblast (Ukrainian: Черкаська область, translit. Cherkas’ka oblast’; also referred to as Cherkashchyna - Ukrainian: Черкащина) of central Ukraine has a long history spanning all the way back to prehistoric times. Archaeological discoveries, have shown that people have inhabited the valley of the Dnieper (Dnipro) River since the times immemorial. The oldest objects excavated on the territory of the region date back to the Stone Age.

== Prehistory and early history ==
More than 40 thousand years ago, the inhabitants of the region used flint and bones of gigantic animals (mammoths, fleecy rhinoceroses, and bison) as tools for land-tilling and hunting. Archeologists have found remnants from that epoch at an archaeological site near the village of Velyka Burimka in the Chornobaivskyi Raion. In the village of Mezhirich, Kanivskyi Raion, a mammoth-hunters' settlement was discovered, dating back to 20000–15000 B.C. Its contemporary – a bison-hunters' settlement – was found in the village of Hordashivka in the Talnivskyi Raion.

More than six thousand years ago, Cucuteni-Trypillian settlements were built in the western part of the region. The Cucuteni-Trypillians became one of the most significant societies of ancient Europe; scholars have compared the level of socio-economic development of the Cucuteni-Trypillian culture with that of the Ancient East, Mesopotamia, and Egypt. The Cucuteni-Trypillian people practiced plowing and cattle-breeding, produced highly developed ceramics, textile weaving, and other crafts.

The people of the Cucuteni-Trypillian culture laid out their settlements in oval or circular patterns, with rows of often interconnecting single- and two-storied dwellings. The largest of these settlements, some of which are located in what is now the Cherkasy Oblast, contained about 15 to 20 thousand inhabitants, making them some of the largest settlements in the world at that time. There is evidence that Cucuteni-Trypillian people believed in natural phenomena, were animistic, and worshipped the images of sun and moon, water and animals. There is also speculation that they practiced a Goddess cult, as evidenced by the numerous ceramic female statuettes that seem to have been honored as symbols of fertility and prosperity.

The Scythians who lived on the territory of the left-bank Ukraine left more than a hundred proto-towns, settlements and funeral mounds, the largest of them in the valley of the Tiasmyn River – Pastyrske, Sharpivske, Buda-Makyivske, and Motronynske. The Scythians were involved in active trading with the Black Sea Greek colonies from as early as the 7th century B.C. Ruins of Scythian settlements survive near the Vasiutyntsi and Krytky villages of Chornobaivskyi Raion. The so-called Golden Scythians roamed throughout the forest steppe of the region with their countless herds of cattle and horses. In 1996 a world-famous discovery unearthed a rich horde of golden grave goods and ornaments in a burial mound of a nameless Scythian chief near the village of Ryzhanivka in Zvenyhorodskyi Raion.

At the beginning of the 1st century A.D., the region appeared to be at the heart of the formation of the early Slavonic tribes. The mighty Antes tribes, who lived on this territory in the 5th to 7th centuries A.D., are considered the forefathers of Ukrainian nation. The valuables found at the Porossia archaeological site prove the high-level development of their civilization. The constant threat of aggression from the South made them built walls and fortifications. Some of them (as Zmiyovyi) still stretch snake-like for hundreds of kilometres along the Dnieper, Ros' and Sula Rivers' right and left banks, reaching 10 meters in height in some places.

== Kievan Rus ==
At the times of Kievan Rus, the borderline region played the role of an important military outpost. The region had not only favorable climate for agriculture but a convenient geographic position as well. From here, one could easily control the old waterway "from Vikings to Greeks" (Grechnyk) and its branch Zalozhnyi Shlyah (Zalozhnyk), that went along the left bank of the Dnieper River. A well-known Solonyi Shlyah stretched along the Dnieper's right bank.

During the 10-13th centuries A.D., the cities of Voin, Roden, Kaniv, Korsun (now Korsun-Shevchenkivskyi) Zheld, Pisochen, and Zarub combined the functions of military fortresses and trade, crafts and cultural centers. In year 1144, the Grand Prince of Kiev Vsevolod II laid the foundation of Uspenskyi Cathedral in Kaniv. Old-Rus manuscripts also mention the Zarubskyi Monastery (1147) – an important centre of religious life in Ukraine. The treasure found by the village Sachnivka of the Korsun-Shevchenkivskyi Raion showed the high level of goldsmith craft, developed in Kievan Rus'.

Mongol-Tartar invasion hampered economic and cultural development of the whole country, laying waste cities and villages of Cherkasy region. Some of them – Voin, Roden, Zheld, Pisochen – never came to life.

People gradually returned to old ruins - the city of Cherkasy grew out of a site of a previous settlement that served as a lookout point over the steppes on the southern boundary of the Kievan Rus. In the year 1305, the city of Cherkasy was first mentioned in Hustynskyi Manuscript together with Kiev, Kaniv, Zhytomyr, and Ovruch.

== Grand Duchy of Lithuania ==
At the time of the Grand Duchy of Lithuania, having escaped the Mongol-Tartars, progressed its expansion on the former Kievan Rus' lands. When in 1362, Great Prince Olgerd destroyed the Mongol army in the battle at Synya Vodanow, the territory of Cherkasy region and the city itself submitted to the Lithuanian authority.

From then Cherkasy, Kaniv, and Zvenyhorodka became district cities and important military points in the defense line on the Grand Duchy of Lithuania's southern border. To better defend against the newly created Crimean Khanate (1449), vassal Tartars and Caucasians were invited to serve and to live in Cherkasy and Kaniv neighbourhood.

The life on the border was especially dangerous because of the constant Tartar sorties, with their traditional route along the Hnylyi Tikych River (Chornyi Shlyach) and the other through Uman. In 1483, Cherkasy first challenged the army of a mighty Tartar chan Menhli-Hirey, and in less than 15 years prince Kostyantyn of Ostroh got the glorious victory at Uman River. When in 1532, the enemy took the fortress of Cherkasy into siege, they couldn't break the resistance of its defenders. No matter how dangerous the region might be, its rich lands and deposits drew the attention of numerous migrants and runaways. The ever-present threat of Tartar o Turkey invasions as well the national and religious pressure of the Polish nobility (which took the place of the Lithuanian one in the 16th century) were the key factors, that triggered the formation of a special social layer – the Cossacks.

Yet in 1533, Cherkasy hetman Ostafiy Dashkovich proposed to build a fortress on one of the islands behind the Dnipro cascade to prevent the Tartar raids. His idea was put into life only in the mid of the 16th century by another Cherkasy and Kaniv headman prince Bayda Vyshnevetskyi, who built the fortification on the island Mala Chortytsya – the prototype of the legendary Zaporozhian Sich. The Lithuanian-Polish period was marked by the land concentration in the hands of nobility and the introduction of the frillwork system, that presupposed turning peasants into serfs. The wheat grown on Ukrainian fields and the potash produced out of Ukrainian wood were the main sources of the feudal prosperity. In cities industry specialization trigged the emergence of first trade unions called Tsekhy. At last in 1584 the Magdeburg Law was granted to Korsun’, in 1592 – to Chyhyryn, and in 1600 – to Kaniv.

The increase of feudal pressure caused a series of Cossack-peasantry rebels headed by K. Kosynsky (1591–1593), S. Nalyvayko (1594–1594), M. Zhmaylo (1625), T. Fedorovych (1630), I. Sulyma (1635), P. Pavlyuk (1637), D. Hunya (1637–1638), and Y. Ostryanyna (1638).

In 1648, at the very beginning of the Liberation War the people of Cherkasy were unanimous in their support of their prominent leader – Bohdan Khmelnytskyi. The administrative division into districts was substituted by the military division into regiments. Thus, there appeared Chyhyryn, Cherkasy, Kaniv, Korsun-Shevchenkivskyi, Uman, Kropyvyansk, and Lysianka regiments that performed duties of the administrative and military units. Cherkasy region became the centre of political life in Ukraine. Hetman's residence in Chyhyryn was the port of destination for Russian, Polish, Turkish, and Swedish ambassadors. It was the place where hetman signed more than 300 Bills (Universals), defining the strategic lines of Ukrainian Cossack State home foreign politics.

Bohdan Khmelnytskyi's death in 1657 made impossible the very existence of the independent state and put an end to people's aspirations. Andrusivskyi treaty of 1667 and "Eternal Peace" treaty signed by Russia and Poland in 1686 split Ukraine into parts along the Dnieper River. The left-bank part of Cherkashchyna was given to the Russian Empire, its right-bank part – to Poland. In the history of the right-bank Ukraine, this period is known as the Ruin.

The century to follow was characterized by social and national oppression of Ukrainian peasantry that resulted in numerous revolts and culminated in Koliivshchyna – the Haydamaka upraise under the leadership of M. Zaliznyak, I. Honta, Y. Shelest.

The right-bank Ukraine was reunited to the left-bank after the final collapse of Poland. Thus, there appeared five new districts of Poltava region as well as five new districts of Kiev region, namely Zvenyhorodka, Kaniv, Uman, Cherkasy and Chyhyryn districts. Their population was split into 5 social layers: nobility, philistine, cossacks, serfs and state peasants.

== Jews of Cherkasy ==
The earliest reports of Jews living in Cherkasy date back to 1487, with records of Jewish wine merchants being attacked and robbed by Cossacks in 1581. During the Khmelnytsky Uprising in the mid-17th century, the capital city of Cherkasy was under siege and many Jews fled. Thousands of Jews and Poles were murdered during the uprising. After Khmelnytsky's victory over the Poles in 1648 at Korsun, Sweden recognized Ukraine in the Treaty of Korsun as a "free people, subject to no one".

The city of Uman, on the western end of the oblast, is significant to the Hasidic Jewish community for an annual pilgrimage to the resting place of Rabbi Nachman of Breslov, the great-grandson of Israel Baal Shem Tov, the founder of Hasidic Judaism.

== Modern era ==
Allegedly, Tchaikovsky's Swan Lake was inspired in the town of Kamianka, as a town associated with the anti-czarist Northern Society of the Decembrists movement.

The Battle of Korsun–Cherkassy, also known as the Korsun Pocket, was fought from 24 January to 16 February 1944 during the Soviet Dnieper–Carpathian offensive. It was the site of a major Nazi defeat as nearly all of the heavy weaponry was lost when the besieged German units attempted a breakout from Korsun.

== See also ==
- History of Ukraine
