= International rankings of Ukraine =

These are the international rankings of Ukraine.

== International rankings ==
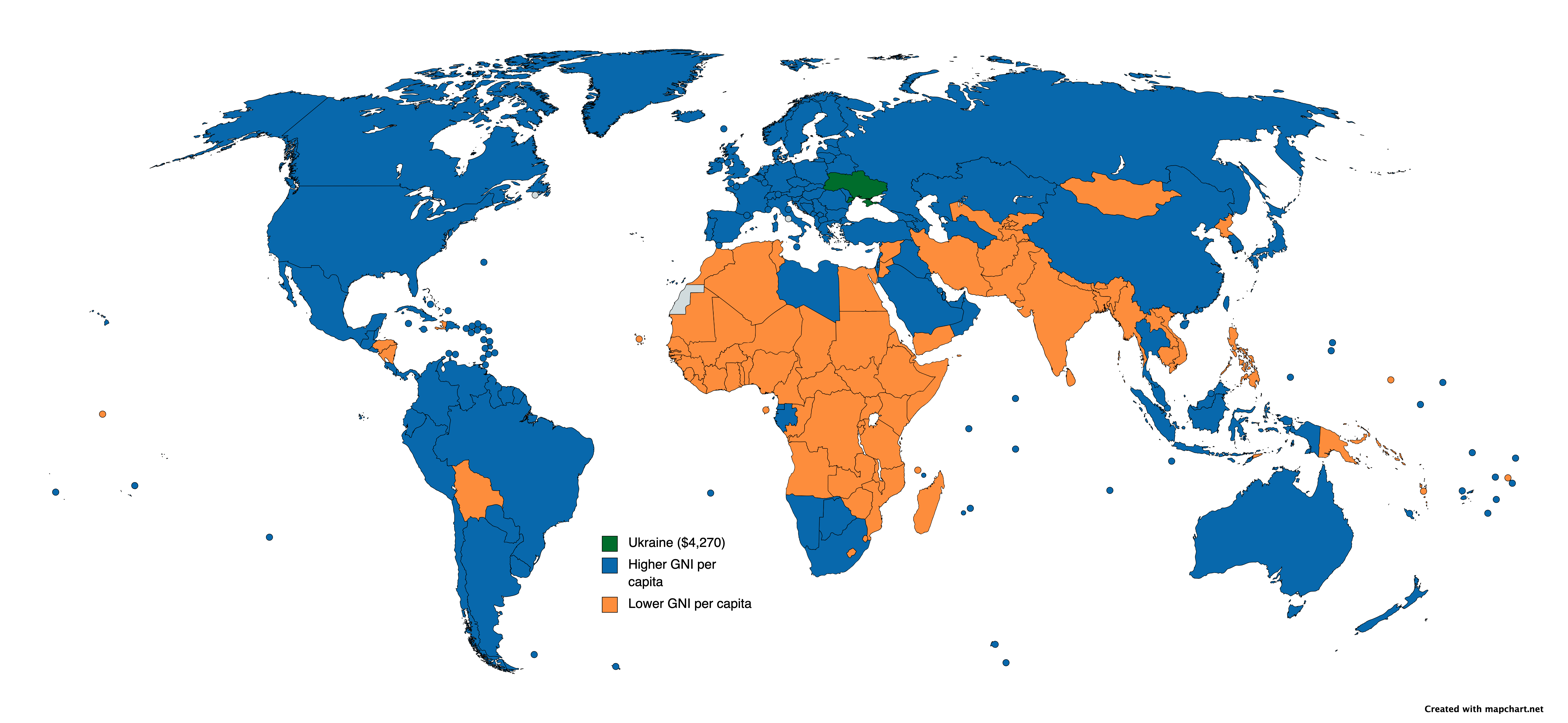
GNI per capita: Ukraine ($2,800) Higher GNI per capita compared to Ukraine Lower GNI per capita compared to Ukraine

Organization	Survey	Ranking
Institute for Economics and Peace	Global Peace Index	82 out of 144
United Nations Development Programme	Human Development Index	85 out of 182
Transparency International	Corruption Perceptions Index	146 out of 180
World Economic Forum	Global Competitiveness Report	82 out of 133
World Intellectual Property Organization	Global Innovation Index, 2026	67 out of 139

== In comparison to The European Union ==
WJP Rule of Law Index for Ukraine and EU member states. View source data.
The Economist Democracy Index for Ukraine and EU member states. View source data.
Corruption Perceptions Index for Ukraine and EU member states (before 2012 multiplied by 10). View source data.

== In comparison to the neighbouring states ==
WJP Rule of Law Index for Ukraine and neighbouring states. View source data.
The Economist Democracy Index for Ukraine and neighbouring states. View source data.
Corruption Perceptions Index for Ukraine and neighbouring states (before 2012 multiplied by 10). View source data.
