= Wildlife of Ukraine =

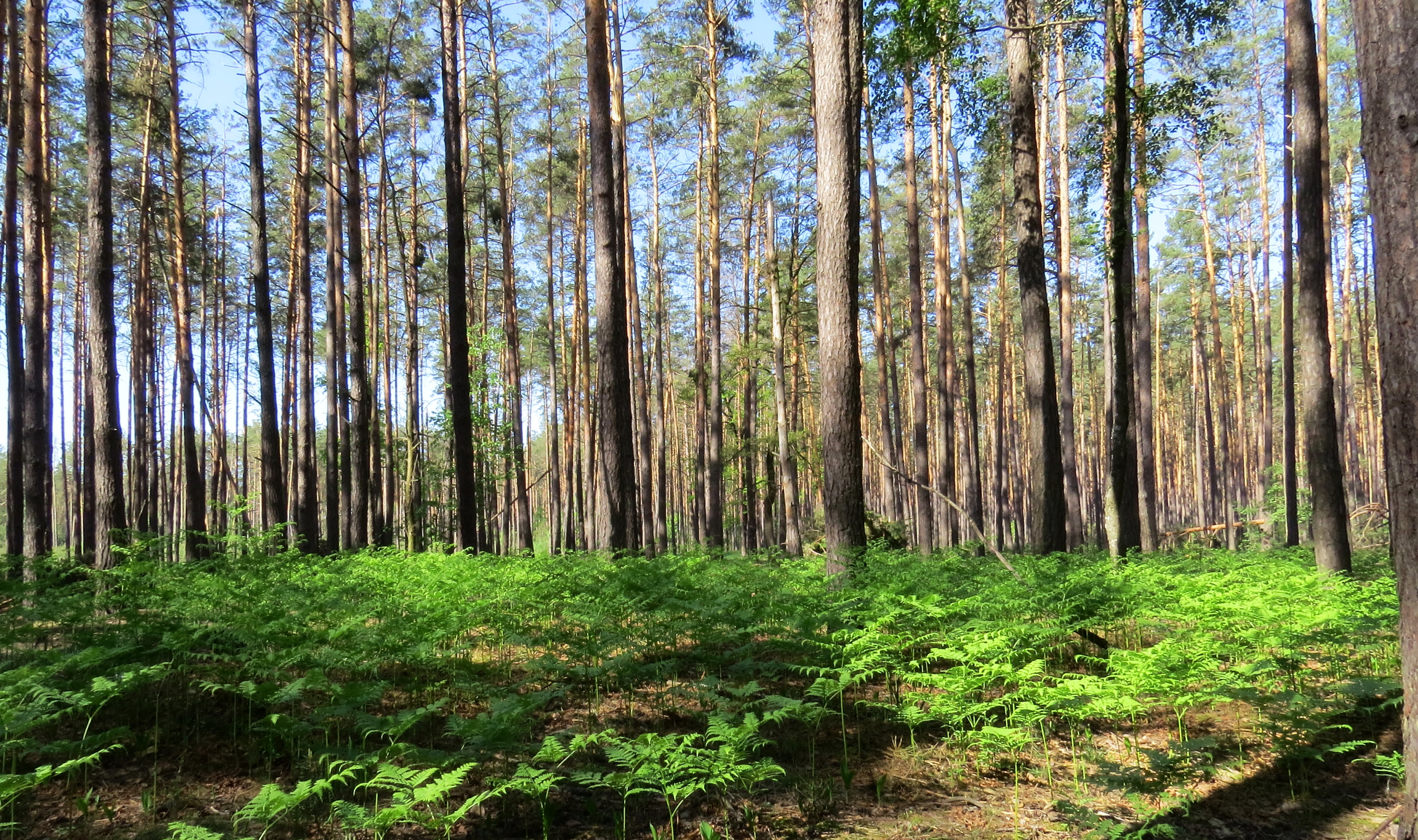
Pine forest near Klavdievo, Bucha Raion, Kyiv Oblast

The wildlife of Ukraine consists of its diverse fauna, flora and funga. The reported fauna consists of 45,000 species when including the areas of the Black Sea and the Sea of Azov. Ukraine's protected environments consist of 33 Ramsar sites covering an area of 7,446.51 square kilometres (2,875.11 sq mi). Biosphere nature reserves and three national parks are all part of the GEF projects portfolio of conservation of biodiversity in the Danube Delta. Their vegetation pattern is mixed forest area, forest-steppe area, steppe area, Ukrainian Carpathian Mountains and Crimean Mountains. Some of the protected areas that were reserves or parks are subsumed under the biosphere reserves.

The isolated or abandoned zone caused by the Chornobyl nuclear power station disaster around the city of Chornobyl, while evacuated of all human habitation, has an abundance of wildlife which is reported to be increasing. However, reports indicate that bird's brains are 5% smaller, and the insect and spider population is in decline.

== Geography ==
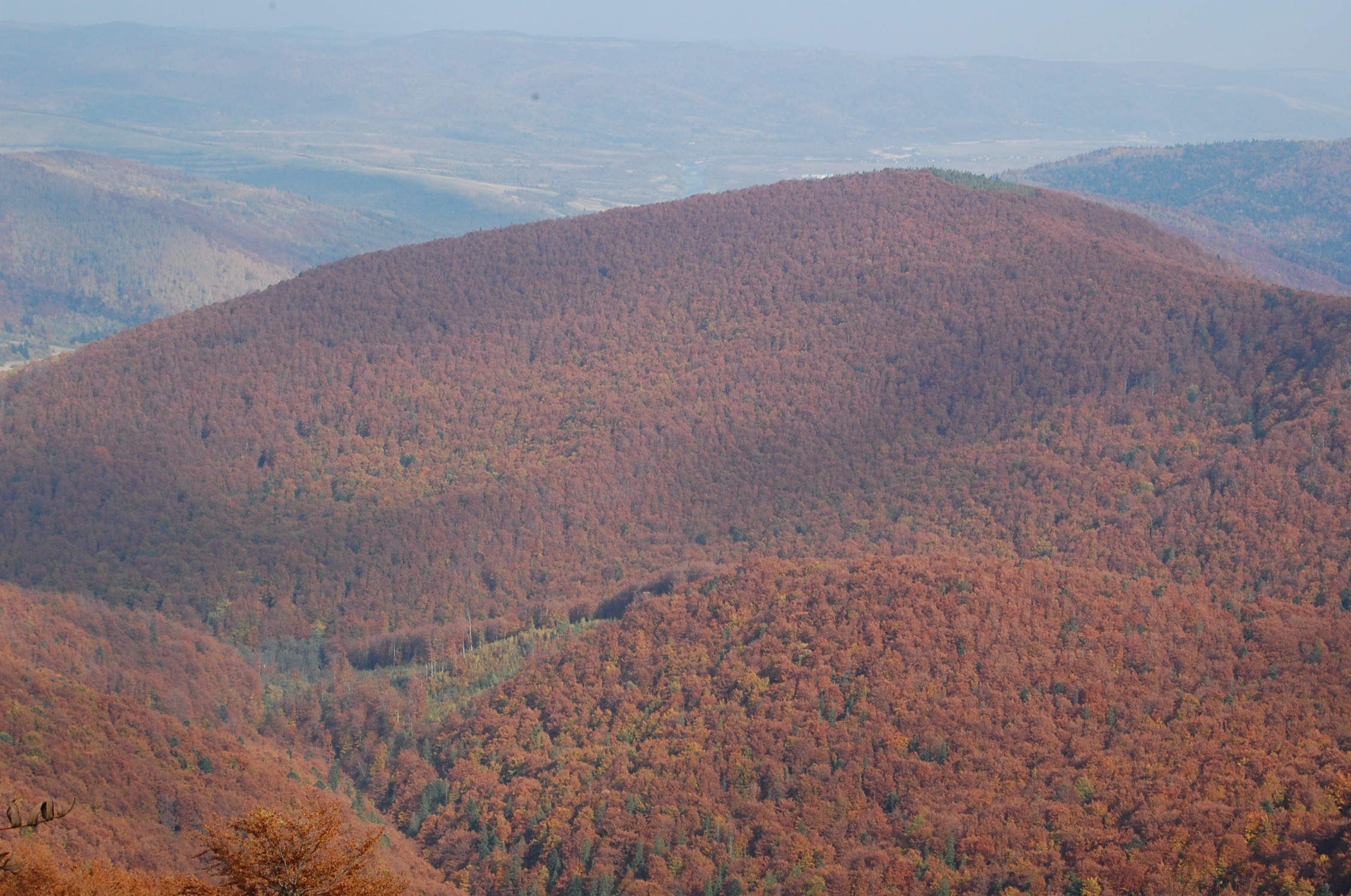
The Ukrainian Carpathians

Central European mixed forests

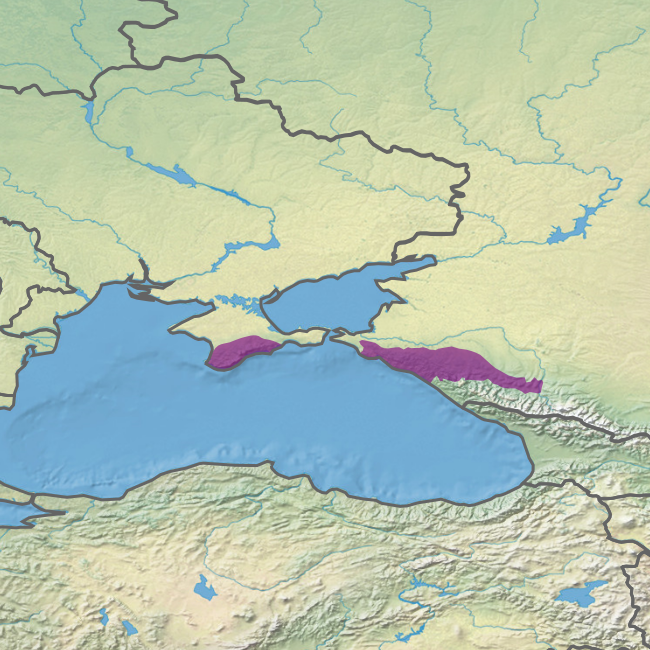
Crimean Submediterranean forest complex

East European forest steppe

Pannonian mixed forests

Carpathian montane conifer forests

Pontic–Caspian Steppe

A synopsis of Ukraine's faunal and flora history was noted in Stephen Rudnicki's Ukraine, the Land and Its People: An Introduction to Its Geography (1912): "Ukraine has a much more varied plant and animal geography than the proper Russian territory, despite the latter's much greater extent. In Ukraine, the borders of three main divisions of plant-geography of Europe meet—the Mediterranean division, the steppe region, and the forest region, with their transition regions. Besides, we meet in Ukraine three mountain regions—the Carpathian. In respect to flora, Ukraine possesses only a few endemic species".

"To be sure the great ice period covered only comparatively small areas of Ukraine with its glacier, but the polar flora undoubtedly prevailed in the entire country at that time. After the withdrawal of the glacier, steppes first appeared in its place, which then, especially in the Northwest, were forced to make room for a forest flora that had immigrated from Central Europe and Siberia. Hence, despite the considerable area of Ukraine, so few endemic species. Since those primeval days, only a very few natural changes have occurred in the vegetation of Ukraine. However, man, through his cultural activity, has wrought many changes in the plant-world of the country."

=== Ecoregions ===
Ukraine contains six terrestrial ecoregions: Central European mixed forests, Crimean Submediterranean forest complex, East European forest steppe, Pannonian mixed forests, Carpathian montane conifer forests, and Pontic steppe.

== Flora ==
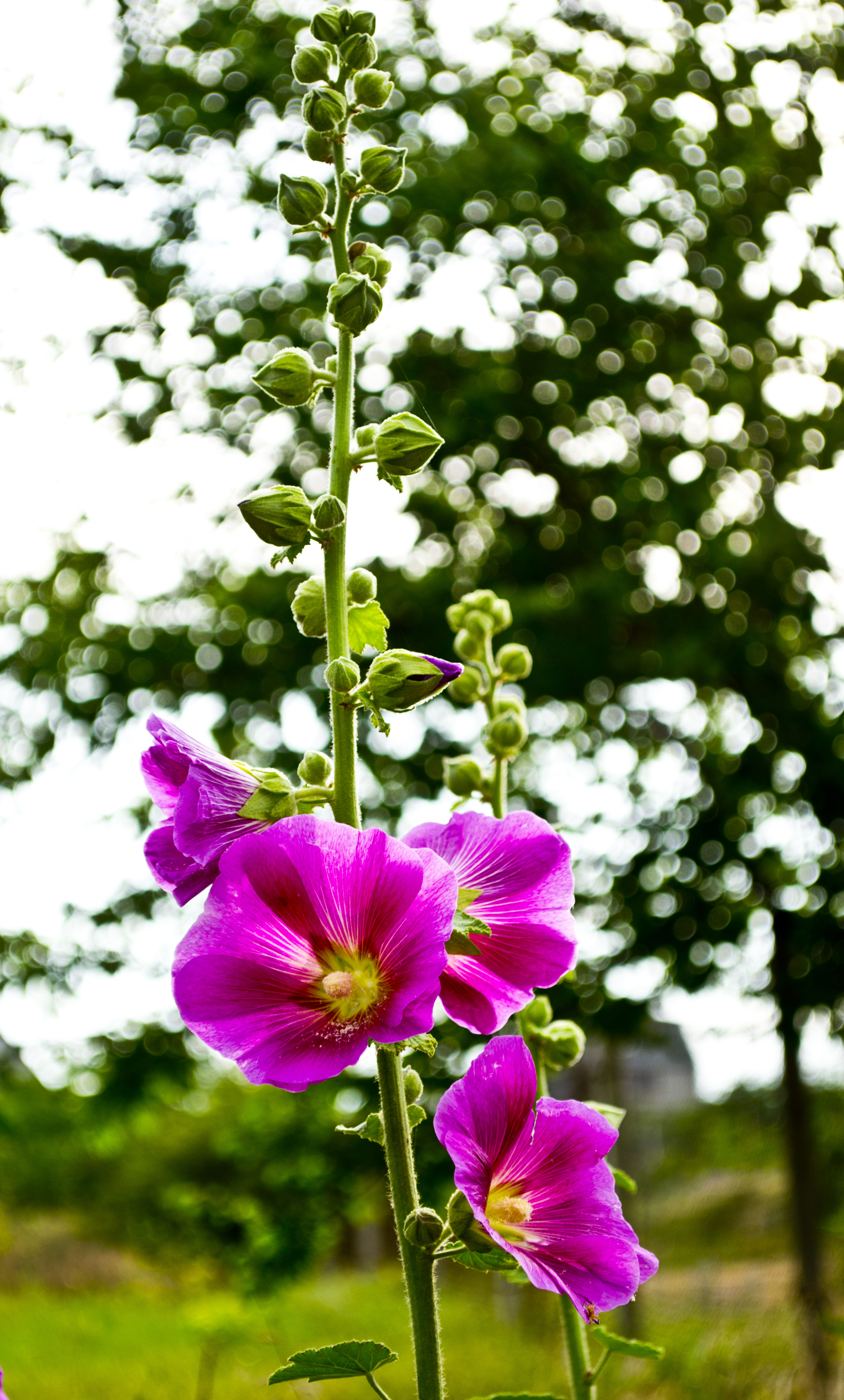
Wild hollyhock in a field near Tylihul estuary.

Ukraine's climate influences the country's distinctive forest stands. Deciduous trees make up 52% with the balance being coniferous. The most densely forested area of Ukraine is in the northwest in Polisia where pine, oak, and birch are the main tree species. In the north-central area, where the forest-steppe belt is located, the main species are oak, pine, and hornbeam. In the southeast area, the steppe-belt is situated, oak and pine are the main species. Mountainous areas are characterized by three zones: lower slopes contain mixed forests, higher elevations contain pine forests, and the highest altitudes contain alpine meadows. In the Carpathian Mountains, beech, oak, and spruce are the main trees, while in the Crimean Mountains, beech and oak form the largest numbers. Along the southern Crimean peninsular coast, the vegetation is characterized by maquis shrubland and deciduous and evergreen Mediterranean plants such as olive trees, cypress trees, oleander shrubs, different kinds of pine trees, junipers and a variety of palm trees.

== Fauna ==
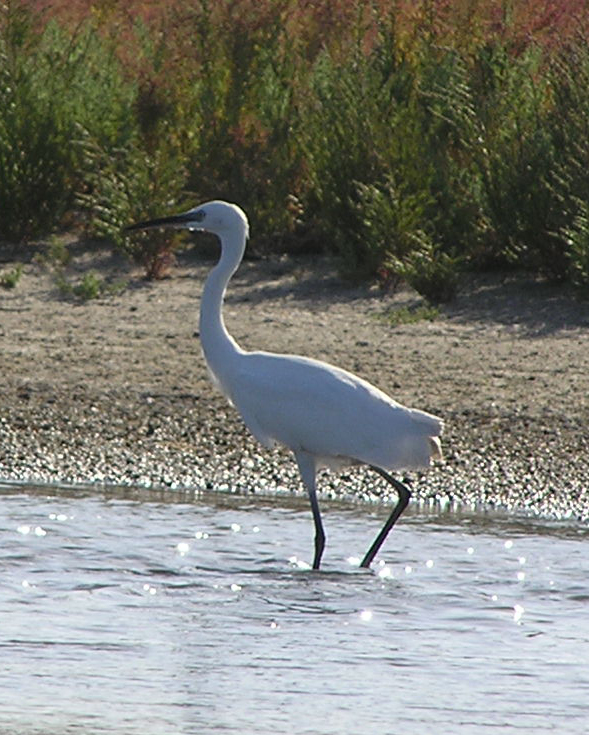
Little egret in Belosarayskoy Spit, Sea of Azov, Ukraine

There are 45,000 faunal species reported. Mammal species number about 108, birds number about 400 species (350 is also mentioned), there are 21 species of reptiles, fish (including subspecies) number about 170 (200 is also mentioned), and amphibians number 17 species. There are about 35,000 species of invertebrates which include insects (of which 12 species are reported endemic). The Carpathian and the Crimea region are the dominant habitats of endemic species. Some of the faunal taxon reported by Animal Diversity Web are the European ground squirrel (Spermophilus citellus), European bison (Bison bonasus), European shag (Phalacrocorax aristotelis), steppe polecat (Mustela eversmanii) and Eurasian elk (Alces alces).

A wide variety of birds are found in Ukraine, those reported including game birds, nighthawks, raptors, song birds, swifts, waders, and waterfowl. Some of the bird species noted are black grouse, hazel grouse, gull, owl, and partridges. There are also migratory ducks, storks, and wild geese. The number of migratory birds is reported as 100 species.

Mammals include Eurasian elk, red fox, pine marten, mouflon, roe deer, wildcat, wild boar, wolf, mice, onager, wild horse, Eurasian lynx, brown bear and great jerboa. Multiple mammals have been extirpated from the country such as lions, Mediterranean monk seal, saiga, and eastern roe deer. Some of the fish species recorded include perch, pike, sterlet, and sturgeon.

Aqua fauna of the Black Sea, the Sea of Azov and estuary have 32 animal species which belong to the Pontic–Caspian steppe region.

There are approximately 385 endangered species listed in the Red Book of Ukraine. These are made up of 41 mammals, 67 birds, 8 amphibians and reptiles, 32 fish, 173 insects, 12 mollusks, 26 cancroid, 7 annelida, 3 centipedes, 2 nematodes, 2 hydro polyps and 2 chubby-faced.

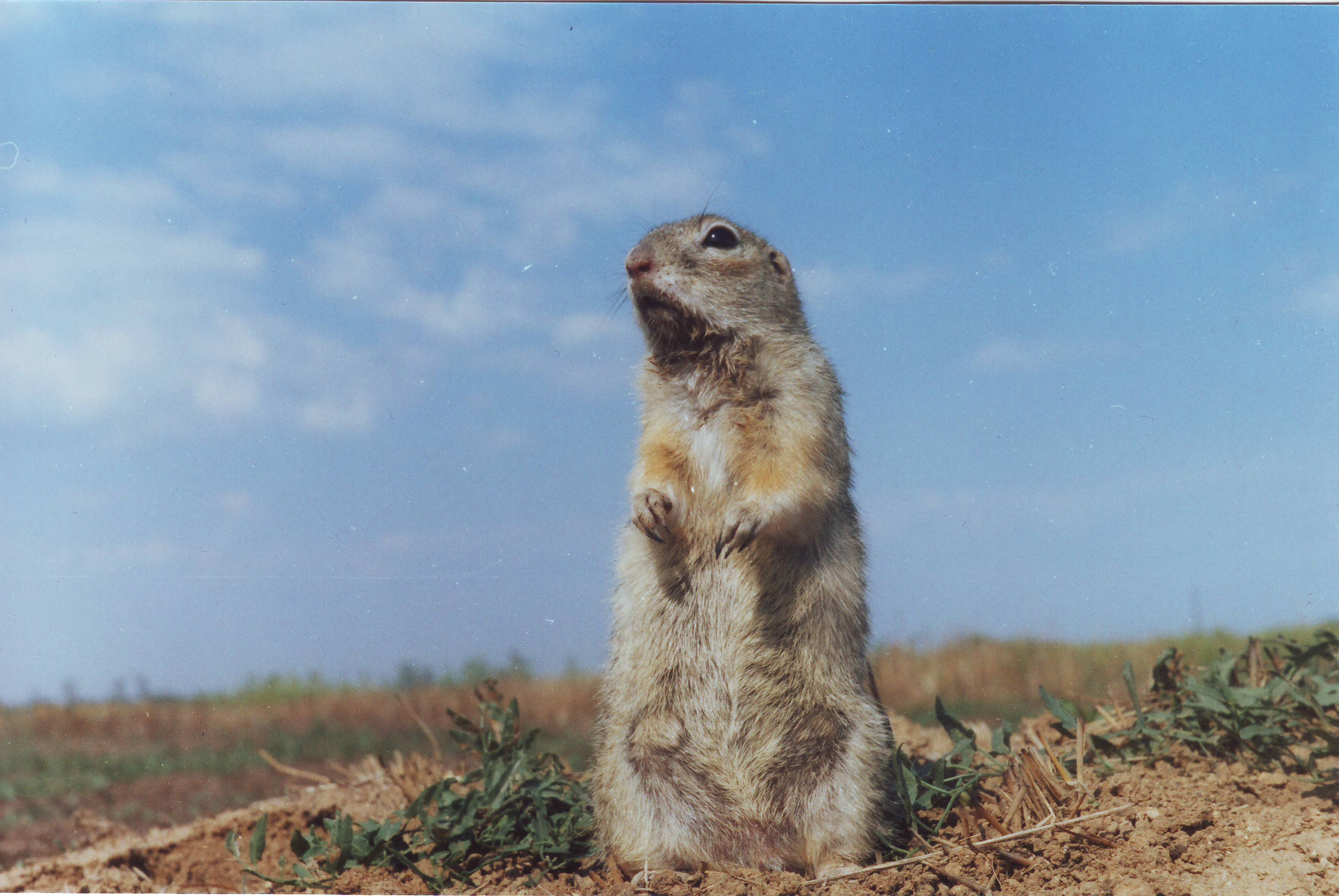
The speckled ground squirrel is a native of the east Ukrainian steppes.

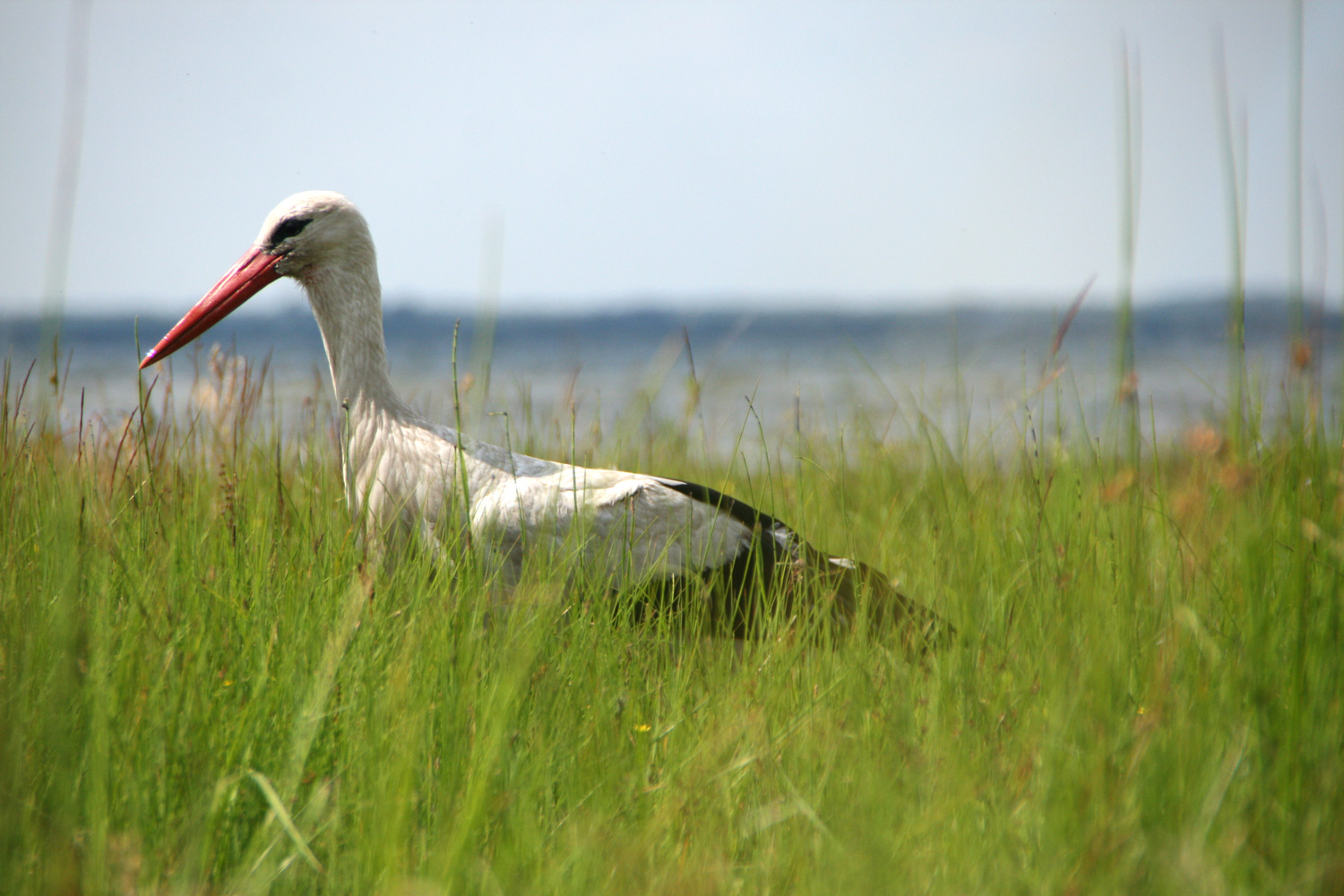
White storks are native to south-western and north-western Ukraine.

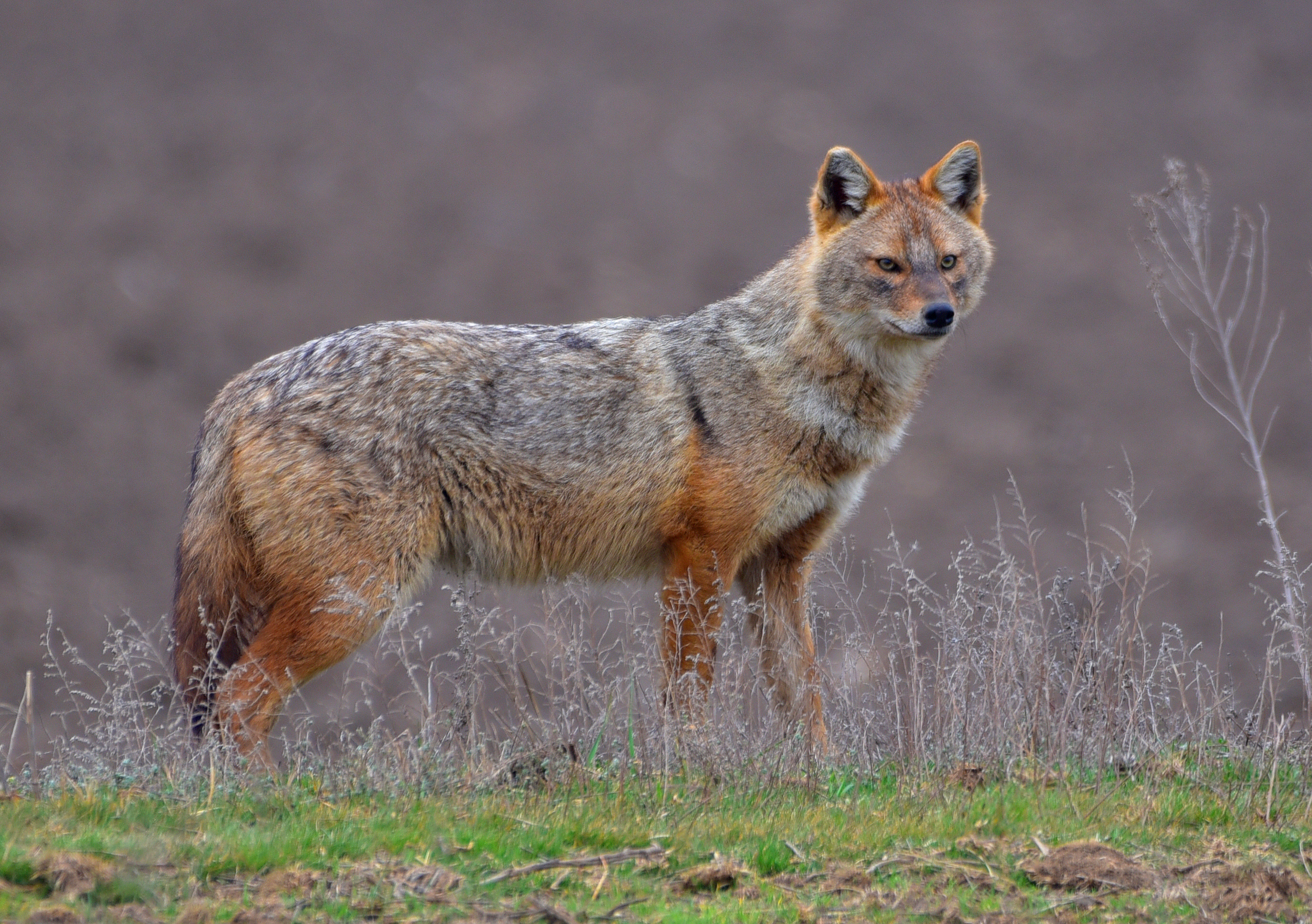
Golden jackal in the Danube Biosphere Reserve

Ukraine falls into two main zoological areas. One of these, in the west of the country, is made up of the borderlands of Europe, where there are species typical of mixed forests, the other is located in eastern Ukraine, where steppe-dwelling species thrive. In the forested areas of the country, it is not uncommon to find lynxes, wolves, wild boars and martens.

This is especially true of the Carpathian Mountains, where many predatory mammals, such as brown bears, make their home. Around Ukraine's lakes and rivers beavers, otters and mink make their home, whilst in the waters carp, bream and catfish are the most commonly found species of fish. In the central and eastern parts of the country, rodents such as hamsters and gophers are found in large numbers.

== Fungi ==
More than 6,600 species of fungi (including lichen-forming species) have been recorded from Ukraine, but this number is far from complete. The true total of fungal species occurring in Ukraine, including species not yet recorded, is likely to be far higher, given the generally accepted estimate that only about 7% of all fungi worldwide have so far been discovered. Although the amount of available information is still very small, a first effort has been made to estimate the number of fungal species endemic to Ukraine, and 2,217 such species have been tentatively identified.

== Conservation ==
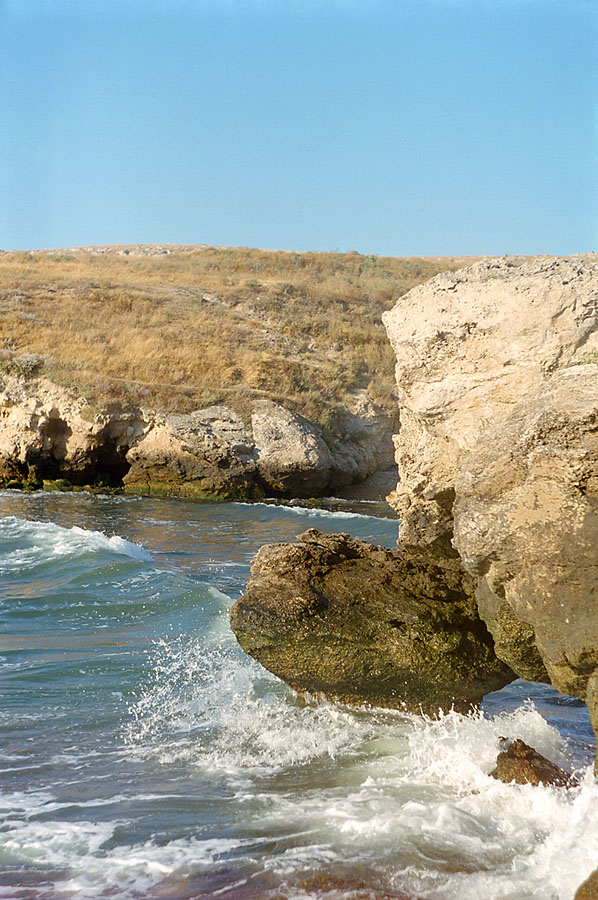
Cape Kazantyp

Conservation effort is through 33 Ramsar Wetlands of International Importance which cover 7,446.51 square kilometres, three biosphere reserves and three national parks.

=== Ramsar wetlands ===
The 33 wetlands inscribed under the Ramsar Convention from 1994 till 2013 are the: Aquatic cliff complex of Cape Kazantyp (2004, 251 ha), Aquatic cliff complex of Karadag (2004, 224 ha), Aquatic coastal complex of Cape Opuk (2004, 775 ha), Bakota Bay (2004, 1,590 ha), Berda River mouth, Berdiansk Spit, and Berdiansk Bay (1995, 1,800 ha), Great Chapli Depression (2004, 2,359 ha), Bilosaraisk Bay and Bilosaraisk Spit (1995, 2,000 ha), Central Syvash (1995, 80,000 ha), Desna River floodplains (2004, 4,270 ha), Dniester-Turunchuk cross-rivers (1995, 76,000 ha), Dniper-Oril floodplains (2004, 2,560 ha), Dnieper delta (1995, 26,000 ha), Eastern Syvash (1995, 165,000 ha), Karkanit and Dzharylhach bays (1995, 87,000 ha), Kartal Lake (1995, 500 ha), Kryva Bay and Kryva Spit (1995, 1,400 ha), Kugurlui Lake (1995, 6,500 ha), Kyliiske Mouth (1995, 32,800 ha), Lake Synevyr (2004, 29 ha), Lower Smotrych River (2004, 1,480 ha), Molochnyi Lyman (1995, 22,400 ha), northern Dniester Estuary (1995, 20,000 ha), Obytochna Spit and Obytochna Bay (1995, 2,000 ha), Perebrody Peatlands (2004, 12,718 ha), Polesian Marshes (2004, 2,145 ha), Pripyat River floodplains (1995, 12,000 ha), Sasyk Lagoon (1995, 21,000 ha), Tuzly Lagoons (1995, 19,000 ha), Shatsky Lakes (1995, 32,850 ha), Stokhid River floodplains (1995, 10,000 ha), Gulf of Tendra (1995, 38,000 ha), Tylihul Estuary (1995, 26,000 ha), and Yahorlyk Bay (1995, 34,000 ha).

=== Biosphere reserves ===
Among the nature reserves established under the UNESCO World Network of Biosphere Reserves, the three reserves are the Danubian Biosphere Reserve covering the Danube Delta, the Black Sea Biosphere Reserve covering a portion of the Black Sea - the Gulf of Tendra and Yahorlyk Bay, and the Crimean Nature Reserve in a portion of the Karkinit and Dzharylhach bays.

=== National parks ===
There are 54 national parks in Ukraine.

== See also ==
- List of birds of Ukraine
- List of fish in Ukraine
- List of Lepidoptera of Ukraine
- List of mammals of Ukraine
- List of non-marine molluscs of Ukraine

== Sources ==
- Katchanovski, Ivan; Kohut, Zenon E.; Nebesio, Bohdan Y.; Yurkevich, Myroslav (2013). Historical Dictionary of Ukraine. Scarecrow Press. ISBN 978-0-8108-7847-1.
- Mosquera-Losada, M. R.; Riguero-Rodriguez, A.; McAdam, Jim (2005). Silvopastoralism and Sustainable Land Management. CABI. ISBN 978-1-84593-147-6.
- Rudnicki, Stephen (1918). Ukraine, the Land and Its People: An Introduction to Its Geography (Public domain ed.). Rand McNally.
