= List of Ramsar sites in Ukraine =

Ukraine has 50 Ramsar sites designated as Wetlands of International Importance. Ramsar sites in Ukraine have a total surface area of approximately 802,604 hectares (1,983,280 acres). The Ramsar Convention on Wetlands came into effect for Ukraine on 1 December 1991.

== Ukraine Wetlands of International Importance ==
Name	Oblast	Area (km^{2})	Designated	Description	Image
Bakota Bay	Khmelnytskyi; 48°35′N 26°56′E	15.9	29 July 2004	part of National Park "Podilski Tovtry", Dniester valley	
Berda River mouth, Berdiansk Spit and Berdiansk Bay	Zaporizhzhia; 46°44′N 36°48′E	18		Sea of Azov near Berdyansk	
Bilosaraisk Bay, Bilosaraisk Spit	Donetsk; 46°54′N 37°20′E	20		Sea of Azov near Yalta, Donetsk Oblast	
Great Chapli Depression	Kherson; 46°29′N 33°51′E	23.59		part of Askania-Nova Reserve	
Cheremske Mire	Volyn	328			
Chilia branch (Kilia)	Odesa	328		Danube Delta at Bystroye Channel	
Desna River floodplains	Sumy; 52°19′N 33°23′E	42.7			
Dnieper River Delta	Kherson	260			
Dnieper-Orli floodplains	Dnipropetrovsk	25.6			
Northern area of the Dniester Liman	Odesa	200			
Land of Dniester-Turunchuk	Odesa	760			
Aquatic-cliff complex of Karadag	Crimea	224	17 November 2003	Sublittoral marine areas up to 6 metres depth, bays, a narrow strip of pebble-boulder coast and coastal cliffs up to 120 m high	
Karkinitska and Dzharylgatska Bays	Kherson, Crimea; 46°00′N 33°5′E	870	23 November 1995	The Karkinit Bay is a bay of the Black Sea that separates the southwestern Crimean Peninsula from mainland Ukraine.	
Lake Kartal	Odesa	5			
Cape Kazantyp rocky shore habitat	Crimea; 45°28′N 35°51′E	2.51	29 July 2004	A headland located in the northeastern part of the Crimean peninsula.	
Kremenchuk Floodplains	Poltava				
Kryva Bay and Kryva Spit	Donetsk	14			
Kuhurluy	Odesa	65			
Molochnyi Estuary	Zaporizhzhia	224			
Obitochna Spit	Zaporizhzhia	20			
Cape Opuk nearshore habitat	Crimea; 45°01′N 36°12′E	7.75			
Perebrody Peat Bogs	Rivne	127.18			
Polissya Marshes	Zhytomyr	21.45		Marshes, mires, and floodplains surrounded by upland pine forests in Polissia Nature Reserve	
Prypiat River floodplains	Volyn	120			
Sasyk Lagoon	Odesa	210			
Shahany-Alibei-Burnas lakes system	Odesa	190			
Shatsk Lakes	Volyn	328.5		The largest Ukrainian lake complex, with 23 lakes separated by peat bogs, meadows and forests.	
Lower Smotrych River	Khmelnytskyi	14.8			
Stokhid River floodplains	Volyn	100			
Lake Synevyr	Zakarpattia	0.29		The largest natural water body in the Ukrainian Carpathians	
Central Syvash	Kherson, Crimea; 46°07′N 34°15′E	800			
Eastern Syvash	Kherson, Crimea	1,650			
Tendra Bay	Kherson	380			
Tylihul Estuary	Odesa, Mykolaiv	260			
Yahorlyk Bay	Kherson, Mykolaiv	340		separated from Dnieper-Bug Estuary by Kinburn Peninsula	
