= Bakotić =

Bakotić may refer to:

- Bakotić, Bosnia and Herzegovina, a village near Maglaj
- Ante Bakotić (1921–1945), Croatian Partisan soldier
- Antun Karlo Bakotić (1831–1887), Croatian writer and physicist
- Božidar Bakotić (1936–2015), Croatian jurist
- Lujo Bakotić (1867–1941), Serbian writer and diplomat

== See also ==
- Bakota (disambiguation)
