= Orly (disambiguation) =

Orly is a Parisian suburb.

Orly may also refer to:

== Other places in France ==
- Paris Orly Airport, Orly, Paris
  - Orly Air Base, coterminous American airfield (1918–1967)
- Orly-sur-Morin, Seine-et-Marne

== Businesses ==
- O'Reilly Auto Parts (NASDAQ symbol: ORLY)
- O'Reilly Media, tech publisher (parodied as O RLY)

== Music ==
- "Orly", a 1973 single by The Guess Who from their album, Artificial Paradise
- "Orly", a Jacques Brel song from his 1977 album, Les Marquises
- "Samba de Orly", a Chico Buarque song from his 1971 album, Construção
- O-RLY?, a 2025 EP by Korean and Japanese boy band Nexz

== People ==
- Orly (name), a given name, and a list of people with the name

== Other uses ==
- Orly (film), a 2010 film
- O RLY?, Internet shorthand for "Oh, really?"

== See also ==
- Orły (disambiguation)
- Orli
