= Bakota =

Bakota may refer to:

== Places ==
- Bakota, Ukraine, a former settlement on the banks of the Dniester
- Bakota Bay, on the above site
- Bakota region, West Africa, home of Ewale a Mbedi in oral histories of Sawa ethnic groups

== Other ==
- Božo Bakota (born 1950), Croatian footballer
- Kota people (Gabon), an African Bantu tribe
