= Dzharylhach National Nature Park =

National park in Ukraine

- Ukrainian: Джарилгацький національний природний парк
- IUCN category II (national park)
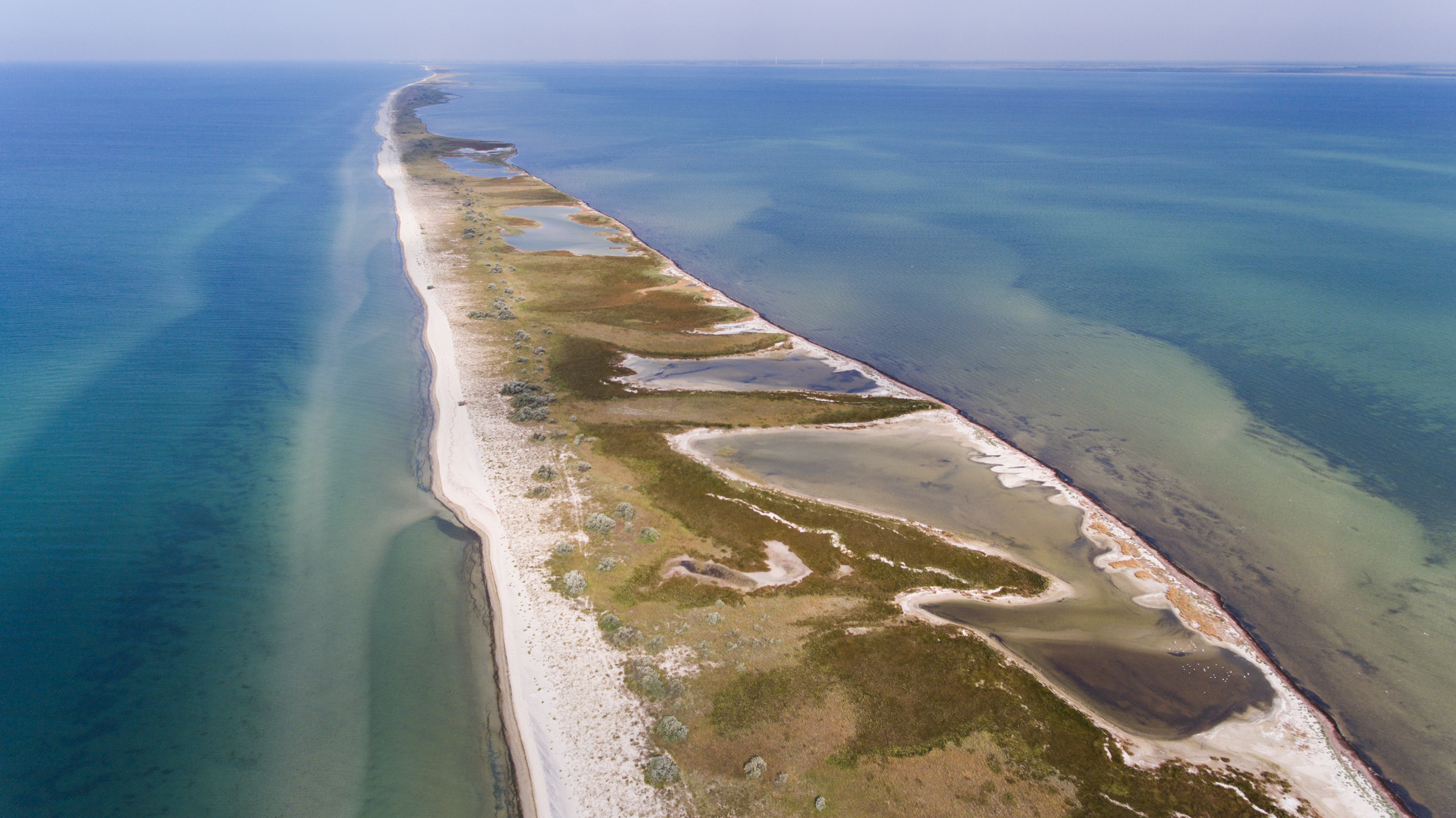
- Dzharylhach National Nature Park

- Location within Kherson Oblast Location within Ukraine
- Interactive map of Dzharylhach National Nature Park
- Location: Kherson Oblast, Skadovsk Raion
- Nearest city: Skadovsk
- Coordinates: 46.01667°N 32.9333°E
- Area: 10,000 hectares (24,711 acres; 100 km^{2}; 39 sq mi)
- Established: 2009
- Governing body: Ministry of Ecology and Natural Resources (Ukraine)
- Website: nppd.com.ua

The Dzharylhach National Nature Park (Ukrainian: Джарилгацький національний природний парк) is a national park of Ukraine that covers Dzharylhach Island and the adjacent Karkinit Bay in the northern reaches of the Black Sea. Famous for clean sandy beaches and mineral springs in its many small lakes, Dzharylhach is the largest island in the Black Sea.

During the Russian invasion of Ukraine, the region was occupied by Russians, who connected the island to the mainland, and then destroyed the national park.

== History ==
Portions of the park have been protected nature reserves for almost 100 years, as the area is an environmentally sensitive representative of north Black Sea Coast nature habitat. Administratively, the park is in the Skadovsk District of Kherson Oblast.

During the Russian invasion of Ukraine, the region has been occupied by Russia in March 2022. In the spring 2023 Russians have created a land bridge to the island and designed the region a military training area, while also opening it for commercial hunting. On 4-5 August Russian military activity resulted in a large fire that consumed most of the area. On 6 November 2023 the Ministry of Environmental Protection and Natural Resources of Ukraine reported that the park was completely destroyed due to "Russian armed aggression" during the Russian occupation of Kherson Oblast.

== Topography ==
Dzharylhach Island is a long, thin line of sand and shoals, running west-to-east in the bay between the Crimean Peninsula to the south, and the mainland to the north. At times of low water, the shoals can become exposed to join the island as a spit of the mainland. The coastal waters are very shallow, typically less than 1 meter. The characteristic salty soil of the island is called solonetz. The bay is part of the Ramsar site Karkinitska and Dzharylgatska Bays.

== Climate and ecoregion ==
The official climate designation for the Dzharylhach area is Humid continental climate - hot summer sub-type (Köppen climate classification Dfa), with large seasonal temperature differentials and a hot summer (at least four months averaging over 10 °C (50 °F), at least one of which is over 22 °C (72 °F)). The average temperature in January is −2.6 °C (27.3 °F), and floating ice may appear in the bay for 1–5 days. Average temperature in July is 22.9 °C (73.2 °F), in the middle of a hot summer season that typical lasts for 5 months. Winds of 6–12 m/s are observed an average of 223 days per year; absolute calm is very rare.

== Flora and fauna ==
The plants on the island are specialized for the environment, and include psammophytes (plants that grow in loose and shifting sand), halophytes (plants adapted to saline habitats), reed-beds in fresh and saline wetlands, the representative flora of coastal meadows and seaside steppe, and synanthropes (wild plants associated with proximity to humans, in this case tree and shrub plantations). Over 500 species of vascular plants, in 72 families are recorded in the terrestrial borders of the park.

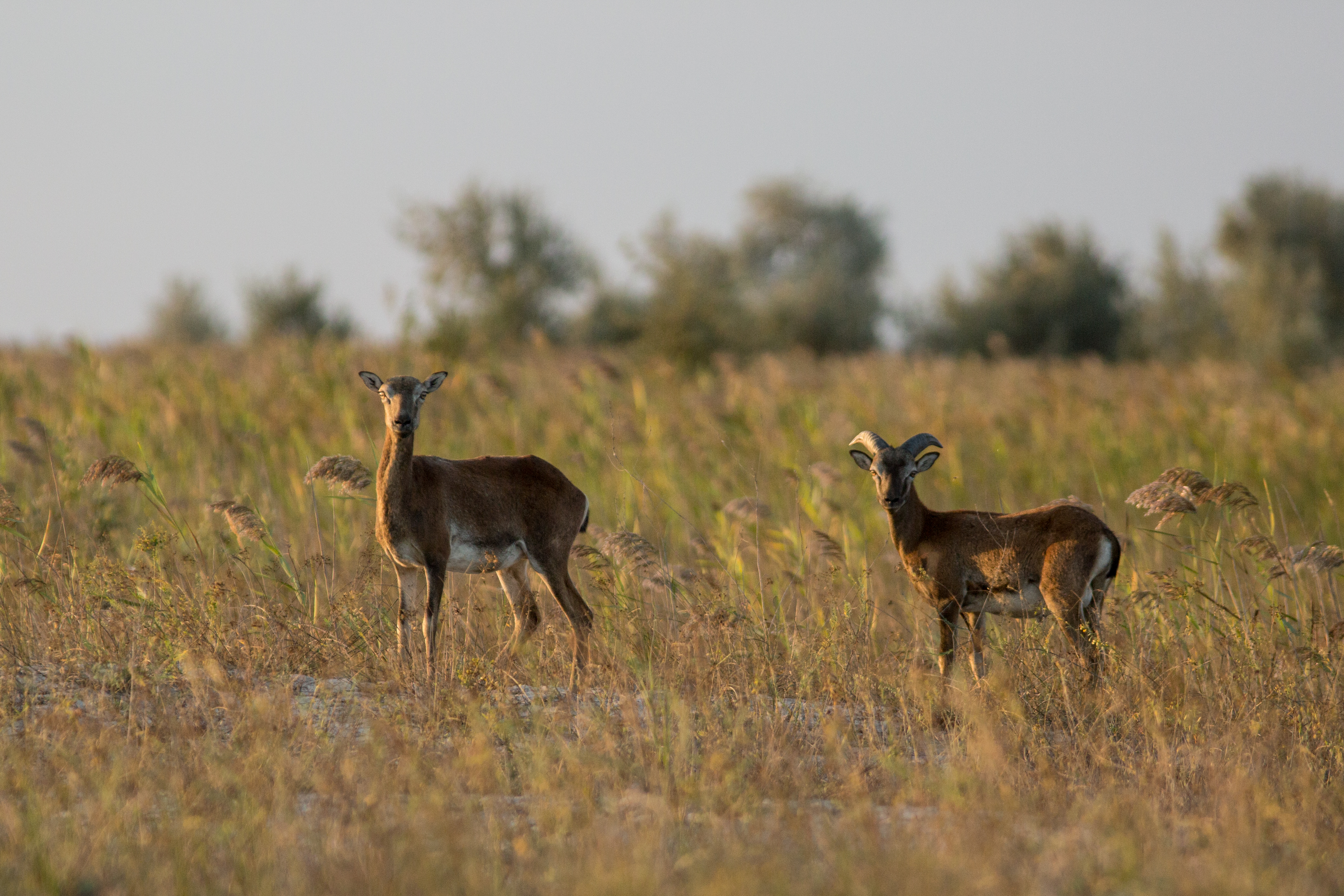
Mouflon, a vulnerable species of wild sheep, in the park

There are over 80 species of invertebrates in the park. Because the area contains many shallow coastal flats with protective thickets, it is famous for crayfish, crabs, and fish. The bay itself is known for mussels and fish. Wild animals include deer, boar, and mouflon (a type of wild sheep).

In May 2022 the park had become an active fighting zone of the 2022 Russian invasion of Ukraine with more than 56 km of its shores planted with mines. On 6 November 2023 the Ministry of Environmental Protection and Natural Resources of Ukraine reported that the park was completely destroyed due to "Russian armed aggression" during the Russian occupation of Kherson Oblast.

== Public use ==
Park management sponsors educational programs for children and school groups, as well as public-awareness activities and ecological tours. The park also sponsors balanced recreational access to beaches, subject to small fees and protection of environmentally sensitive zones. The area is important for waterfowl. The vulnerable red-breasted goose is endemic to the area
