= Podilski Tovtry National Nature Park =

National park in Ukraine

Coordinates: 48°41′N 26°35′E

Podilski Tovtry
- IUCN category II (national park)
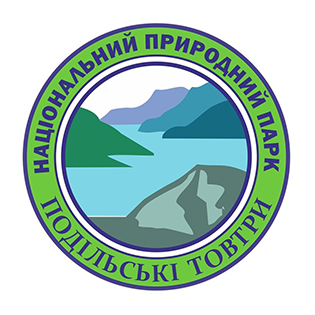

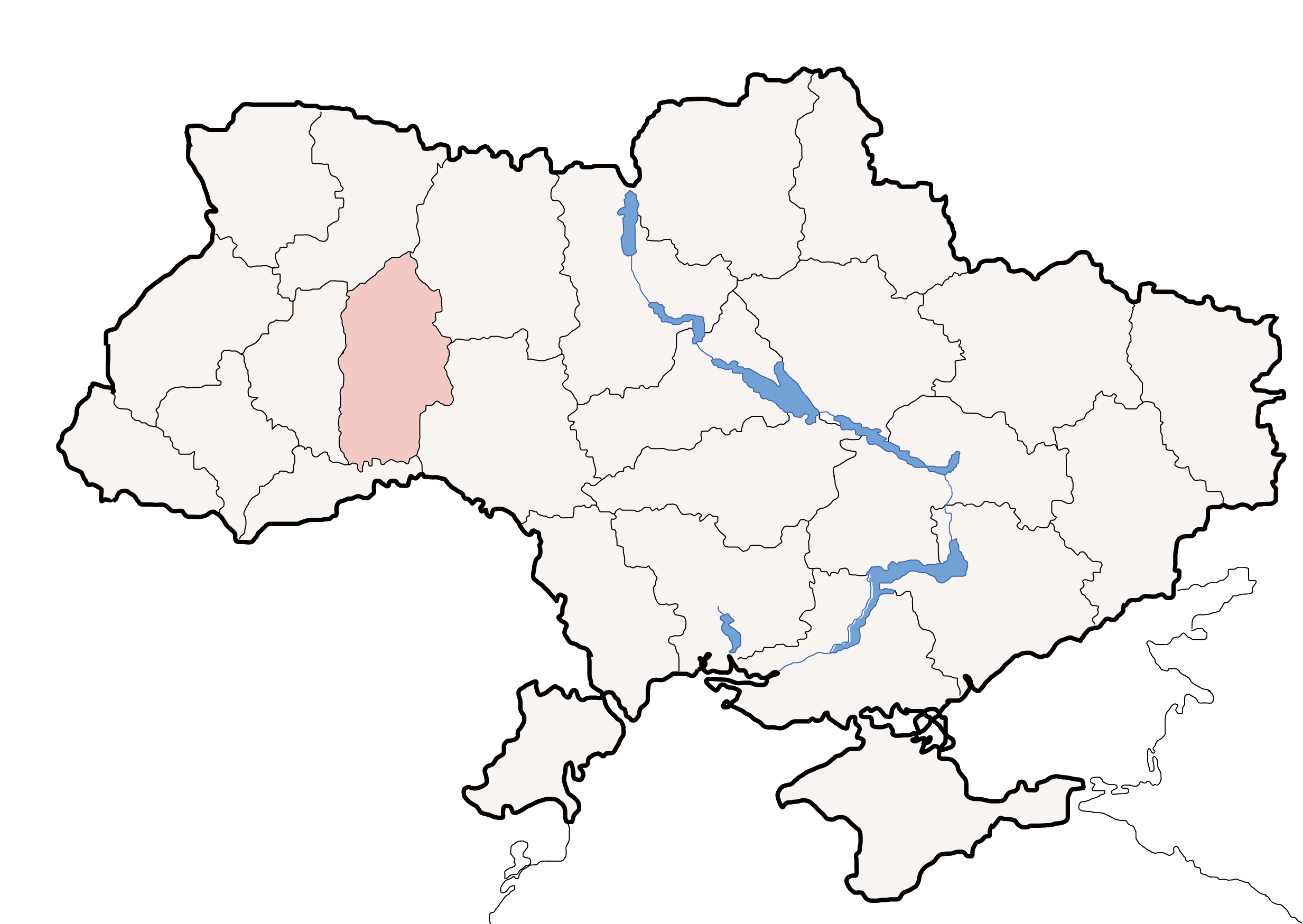
- Location of Khmelnytskyi Oblast in Ukraine
- Interactive map of Podilski Tovtry
- Location: Khmelnytskyi Oblast, Ukraine
- Nearest city: Kamianets-Podilskyi
- Area: 2,613.16 km^{2} (1,008.95 sq mi)
- Established: July 27, 1996
- Named for: Tovtry, specific term for local hills
- Governing body: Ministry of Natural Environment Protection of Ukraine
- Website: https://www.npptovtry.org.ua/

The Podilski Tovtry National Nature Park (Ukrainian: Національний природний парк «Подільські Товтри», romanized: Natsionalnyi pryrodnyi park "Podilski Tovtry") is a national park, located in Khmelnytskyi and Kamianets-Podilskyi Raions (districts) of Khmelnytskyi Oblast (province) in the southern region of the western Ukraine. It is the largest nature conservation area in Ukraine.

The National Environmental Park "Podilski Tovtry" was created on the decree #476/96 of the President of Ukraine, then Leonid Kuchma, on July 27, 1996, in order to maintain and protect the natural landscape of the Podillia region. The park is a nature-conservational, recreational, culturally enlightening, and scientifically researching institution of national importance. According to the Law of Ukraine of September 21, 2000 #1989-III, the National nature park "Podilski Tovtry" belongs to the National Ecological Network of Ukraine of the Podillia region (Podillia).

== General overview ==
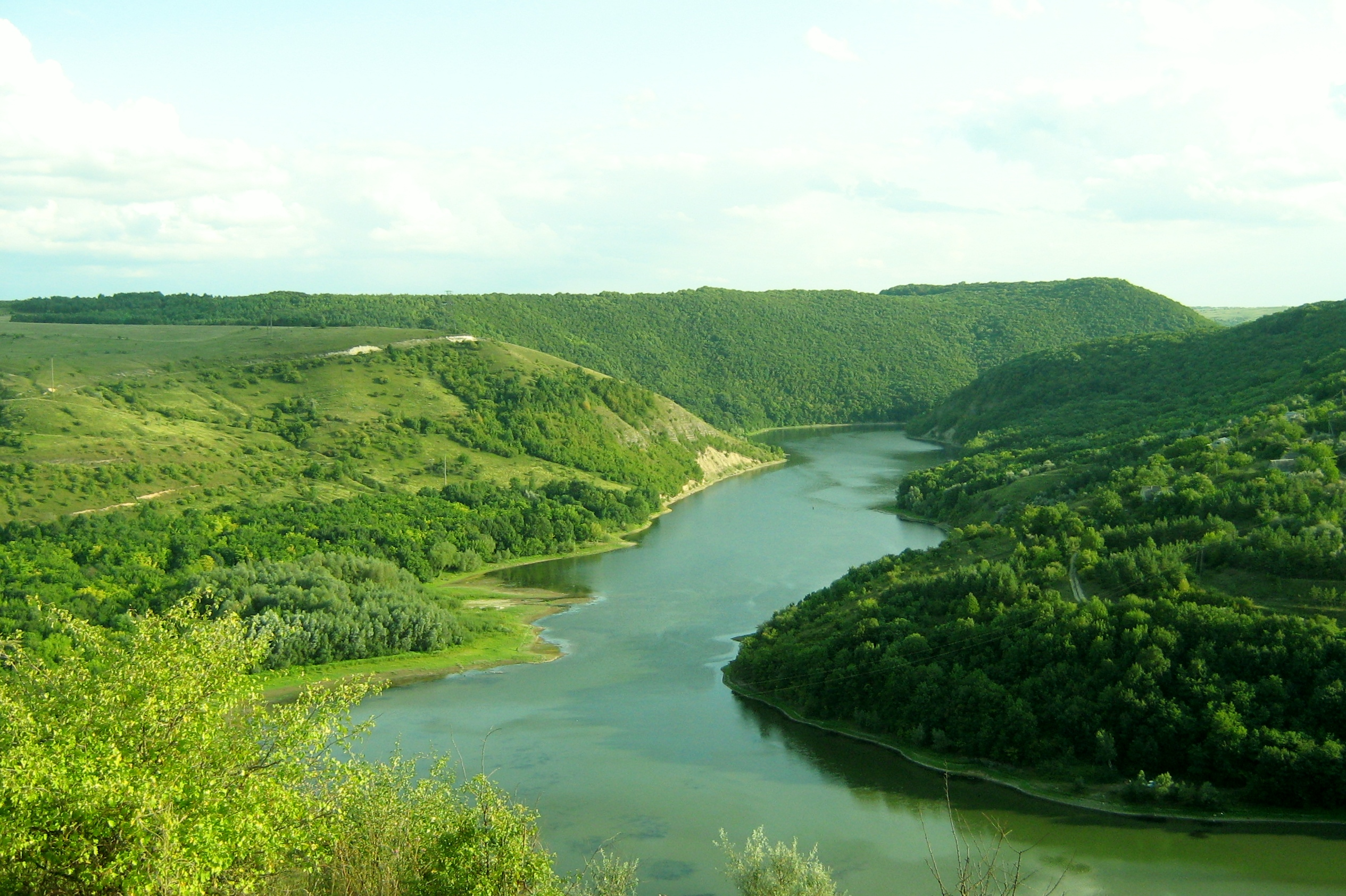
View of the entrance to the park, near the historic town of Bakota.

The park's area covers 2,613.16 km^{2} (645,725.9 acre). There are 1,700 different types of flora, 60 of which are included in the Red Book of Ukraine. Also, there are 217 different types of fauna, 29 of which are included in the Red Book of Ukraine as well. In total there are 127 objects of nature conservation which contain about 3,000 different types, forms, and sorts of plants.

The park is divided into several functional zones: sacred zone, regulated recreation zone, stationary recreation zone, and managed zone. In those zones are located 21 stationary recreation institutions (such as sanatoriums, profilactoriums, tourist resorts, holiday homes, etc.), some 160 industrial companies, collective and individual farming that cause harm to nature. Therefore, the main goal of the National nature park is the preservation of natural diversity, creation of the organized zones of recreation and wellness.

The park's natural borders serve Zbruch River to the west (south from the Sataniv), Dniester to the south towards the mouth of Ushytsia River, former administrative borders of the Nova Ushytsia and Dunaivtsi Raions to the east, the Dymytrov, Ordzhonikidze, Vatutin collective farms (Horodok Raion) to the north.

The park includes some 14% of state forest fund, over 13% of collective farm forests, and other territories of the region. The total forest fund of the park accounts for some 3,015 hectares (7,450 acres).

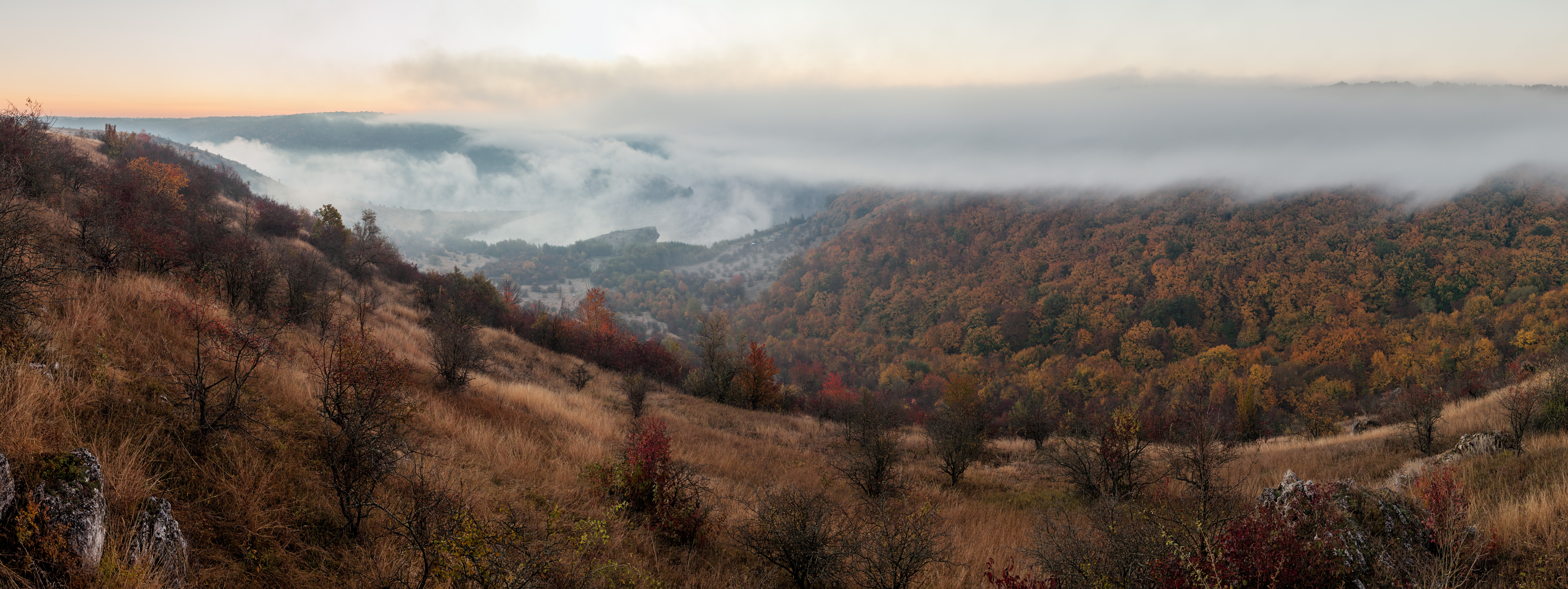
Sunrise over the Studenytsia River, which flows through the park.

=== Major landmarks ===
- 15 various state reserves
- 4 state monuments of nature
- Botanical garden
- Bakota Bay (Ramsar sites in Ukraine)
- Lower Smotrych River (Ramsar sites in Ukraine)

=== Cultural and historical landmarks ===
- 19 archaeological sites
- 302 monuments of historical and cultural heritage (including the Kamianets-Podilskyi Castle), 205 of which are located in the city of Kamianets-Podilskyi

=== Arden Predator Park Rehabilitation Center ===
On the territory of the park with an area of 32.25 hectares, located within the forest plots of the SE "Yarmolynetske Forestry" in quarters 11 (units 2, 3, 6, 7, 9, 10) and 12 (units 1, 5, 6) the Rehabilitation Center "Park of predators Arden" is located, in which residents and undergoing rehabilitation of predatory animals such as brown and Himalayan bears, wolves and foxes, as well as birds of prey.

== See also ==
- Kamianets-Podilskyi Castle

== Gallery ==
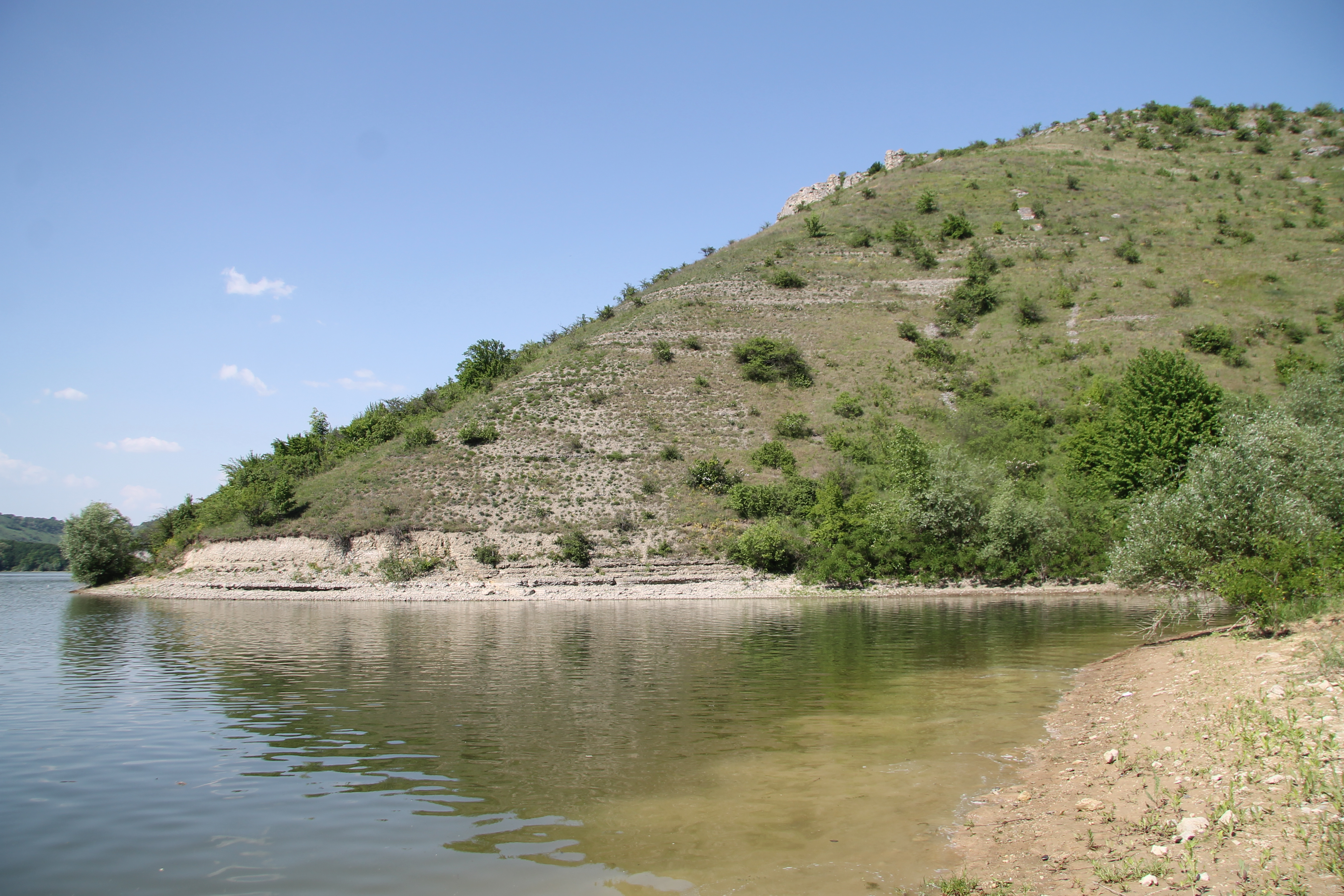

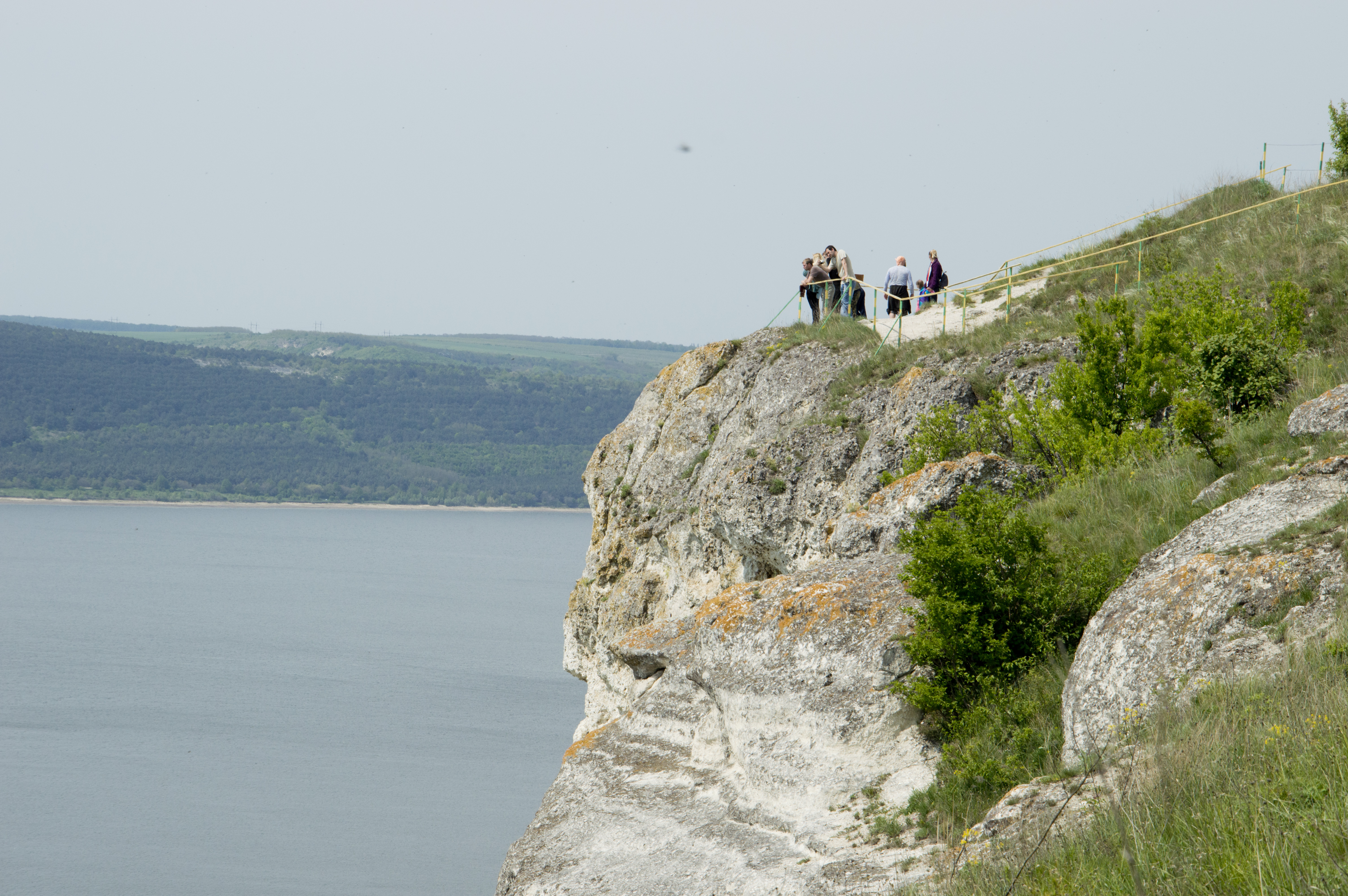

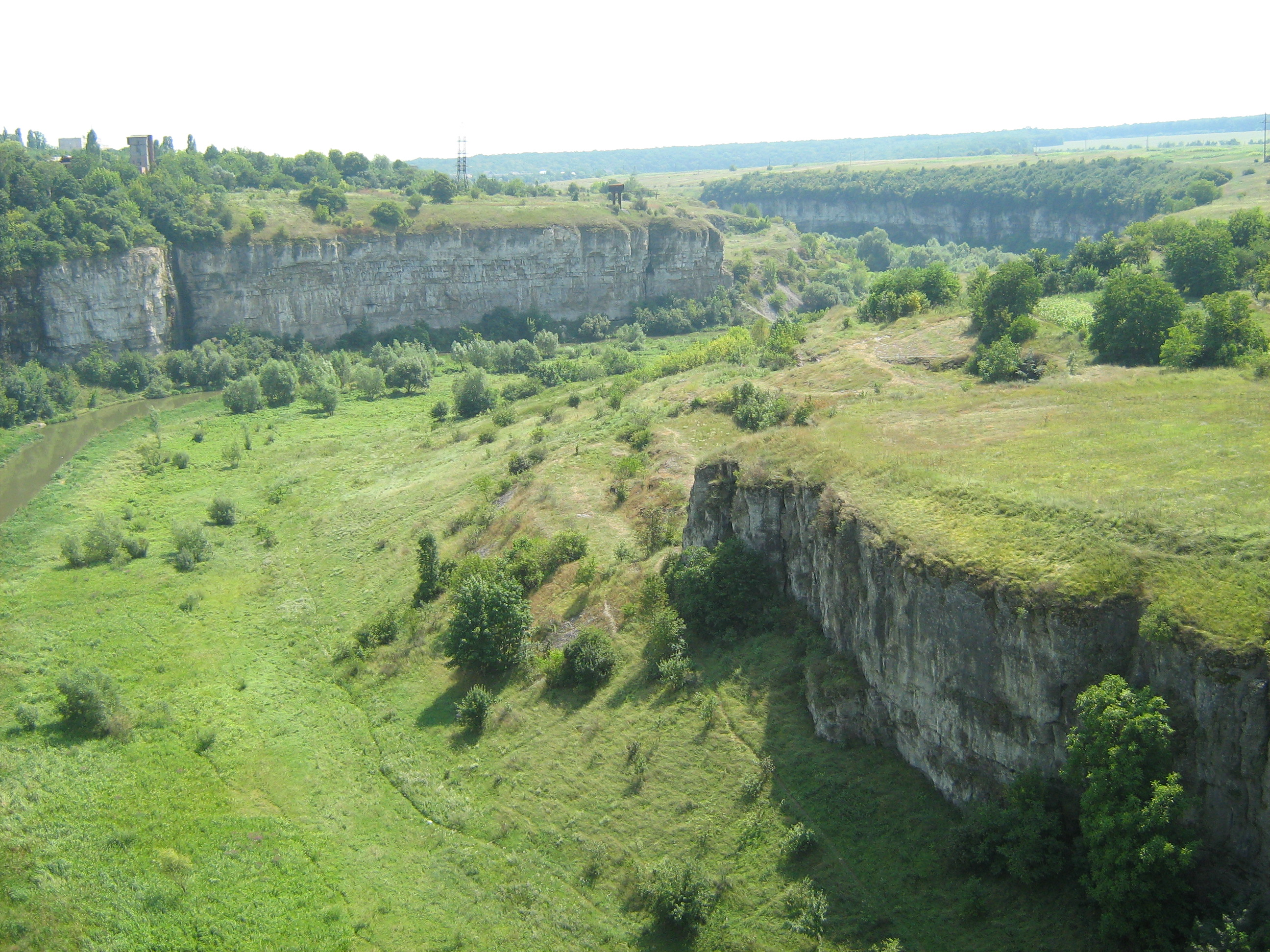

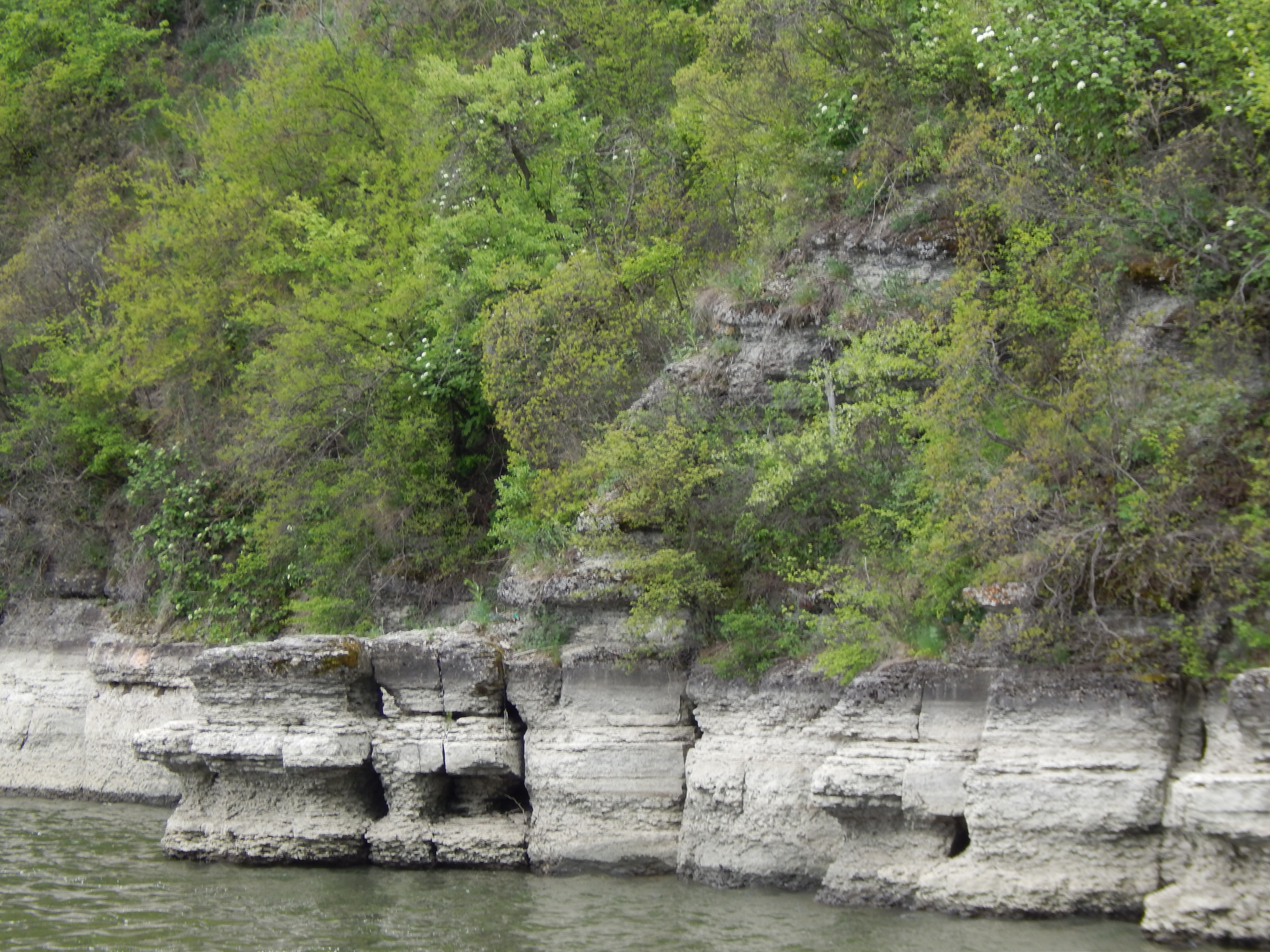

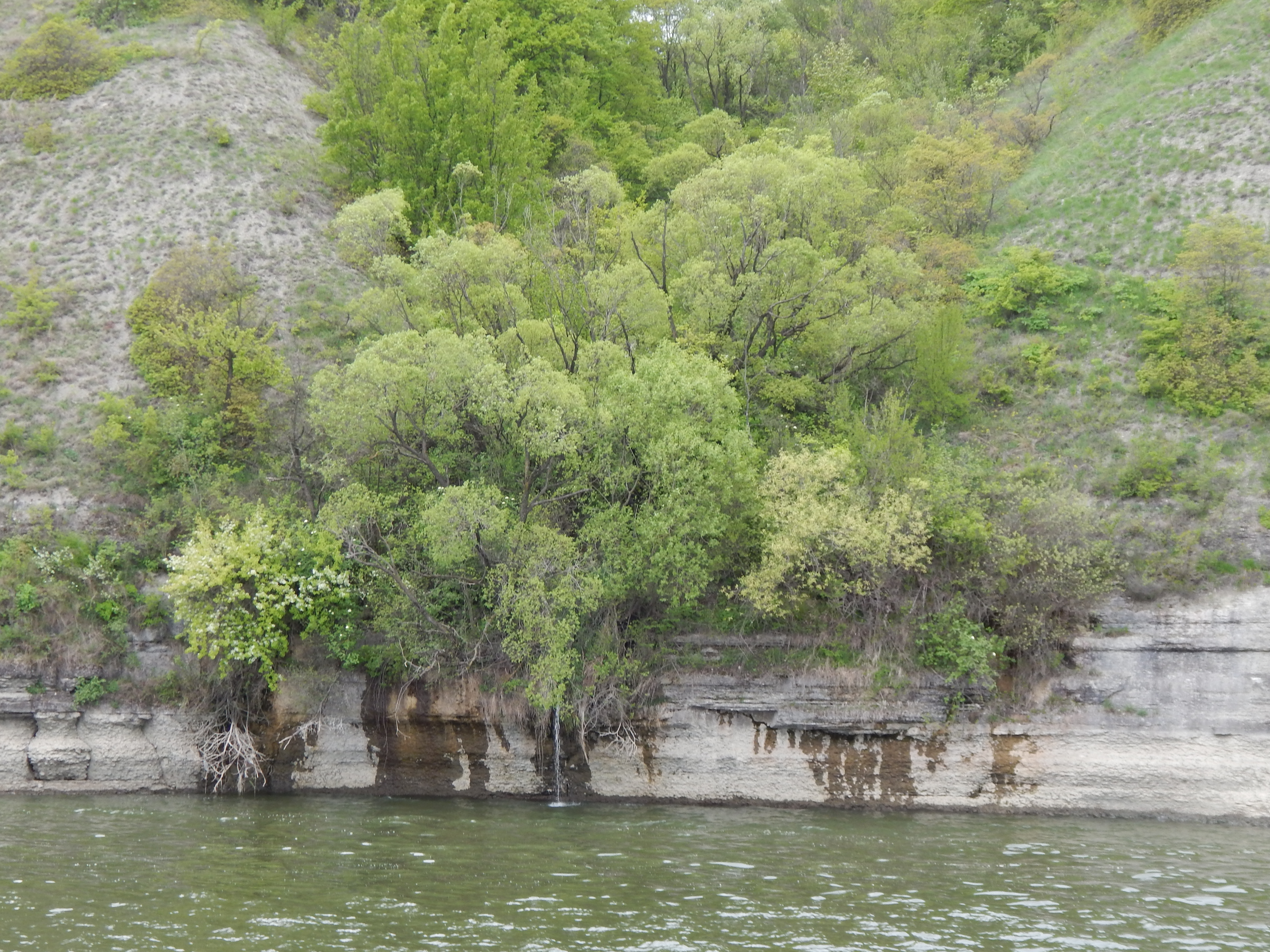

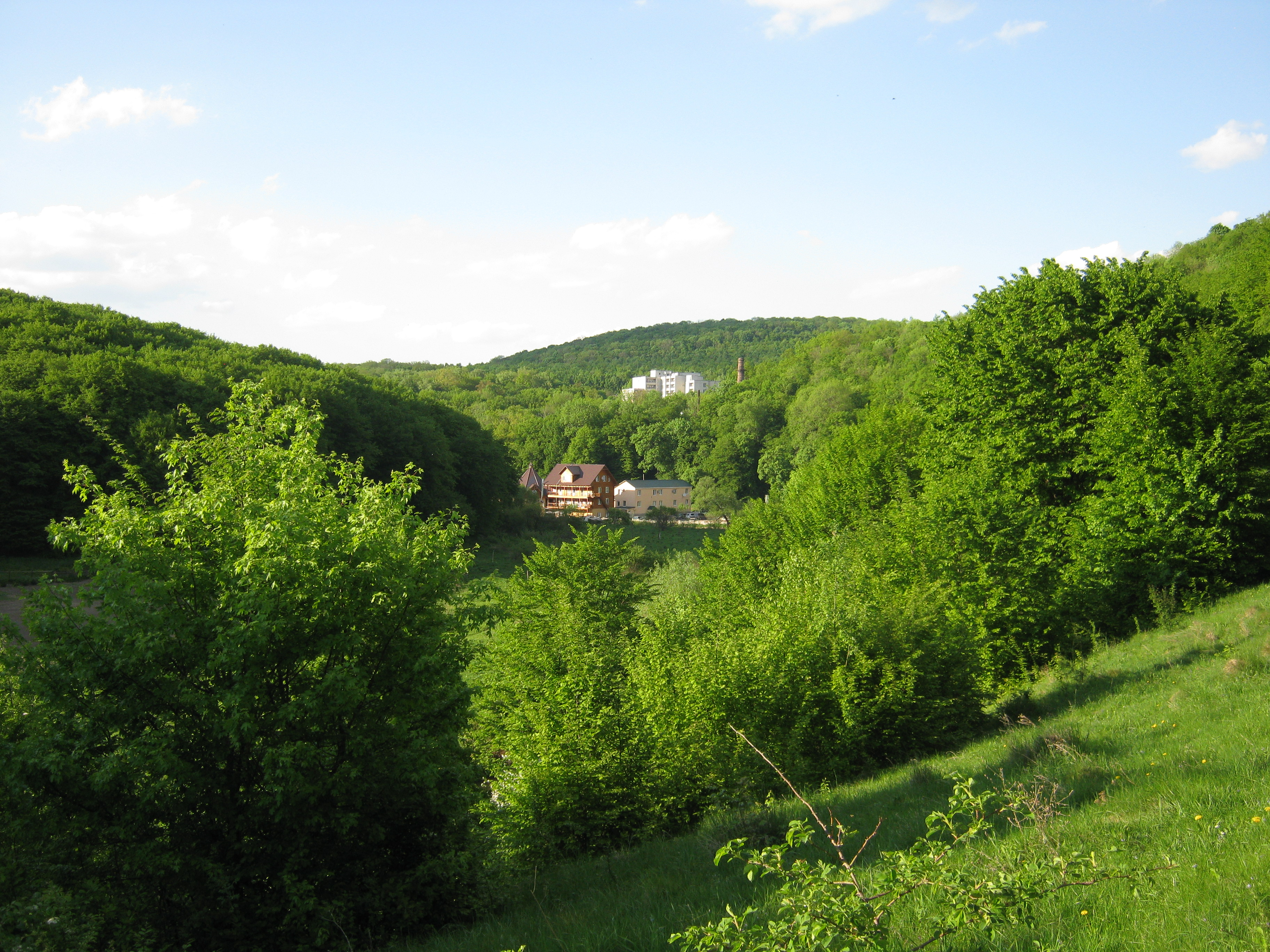
