= Swan Islands Nature Reserve =

Strict nature reserve in Crimea

- Ukrainian: Лебедині острови (заповідник); Russian: Лебяжьи острова (заповедник)
- IUCN category Ia (strict nature reserve)
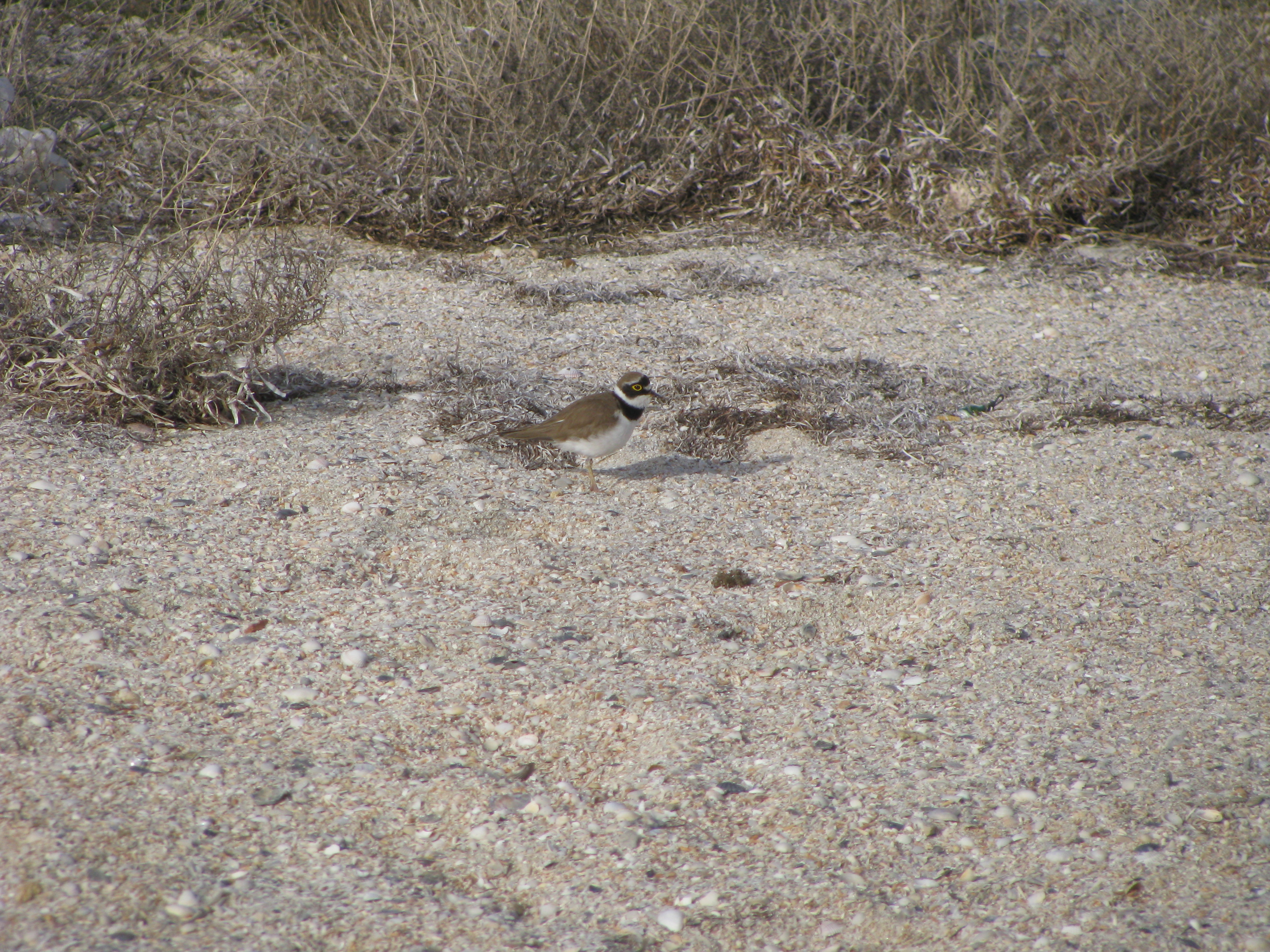
- Swan Islands Nature Reserve

- Location within Crimea
- Location: Disputed; Ukraine (de jure) / Russia (de facto); Rozdolne Raion
- Nearest city: Krasnoperekopsk
- Coordinates: 45°52′30″N 33°32′30″E
- Area: 9,612 hectares (23,752 acres; 96 km^{2}; 37 sq mi)
- Established: 1949
- Website: http://zapovednik-crimea.udprf-crimea.com/

The Swan Islands Nature Reserve (Ukrainian: Заповідник «Лебедині острови») is a strict nature reserve, protecting a series of islands off the northwest coast of the Crimean Peninsula that this an important resting place for migratory birds in the summer and fall, and a nesting place in winter. It is a sub-unit of the Crimean Nature Reserve. The reserve was created in 1949, and covers an area of 9,612 hectares (37.11 sq mi). Administratively, it is in Rozdolne Raion of Crimea.

== Topography ==
The islands stretch for 8 km, with elevations reaching only 2 meters above the level of the Black Sea. The land area of the islands themselves is only 52 ha, but the protected shallow marine areas around the islands stretch for about 30 km along the northwest coast and have an area of 9,560 hectares. A further 27,646 hectares of surrounding area have been declared a wildlife sanctuary.

== Climate and ecoregion ==
The official climate designation for the Crimean Nature Reserve is "Humid continental climate - hot summer sub-type" (Köppen climate classification Dfa), with large seasonal temperature differentials and a hot summer (at least four months averaging over 10 °C (50 °F), at least one of which is over 22 °C (72 °F).

== Flora and fauna ==
Overall, 255 species of birds have been recorded in the reserve territory. In winter, bird counts have estimated 10 to 30 thousand ducks (including mallard, teal, merganser and others), up to 2 thousand geese (greater white-fronted goose and grey goose), up to 2 thousand coots, more than a thousand gulls, and more than 2.5 thousand swans (mute swan, whooper swan).

== Public use ==
As a strict nature reserve, Swan Island's primary purpose is protection of nature and scientific study. Public access is restricted: mass recreation and construction of facilities is prohibited as are hunting and fishing.

== See also ==
- Lists of Nature Preserves of Ukraine (class Ia protected areas)
- National Parks of Ukraine (class II protected areas)
- Crimean Nature Reserve
- Karkinitsky Reserve
