= Karkinitsky Reserve =

Coordinates: 45°55′30″N 33°31′30″E

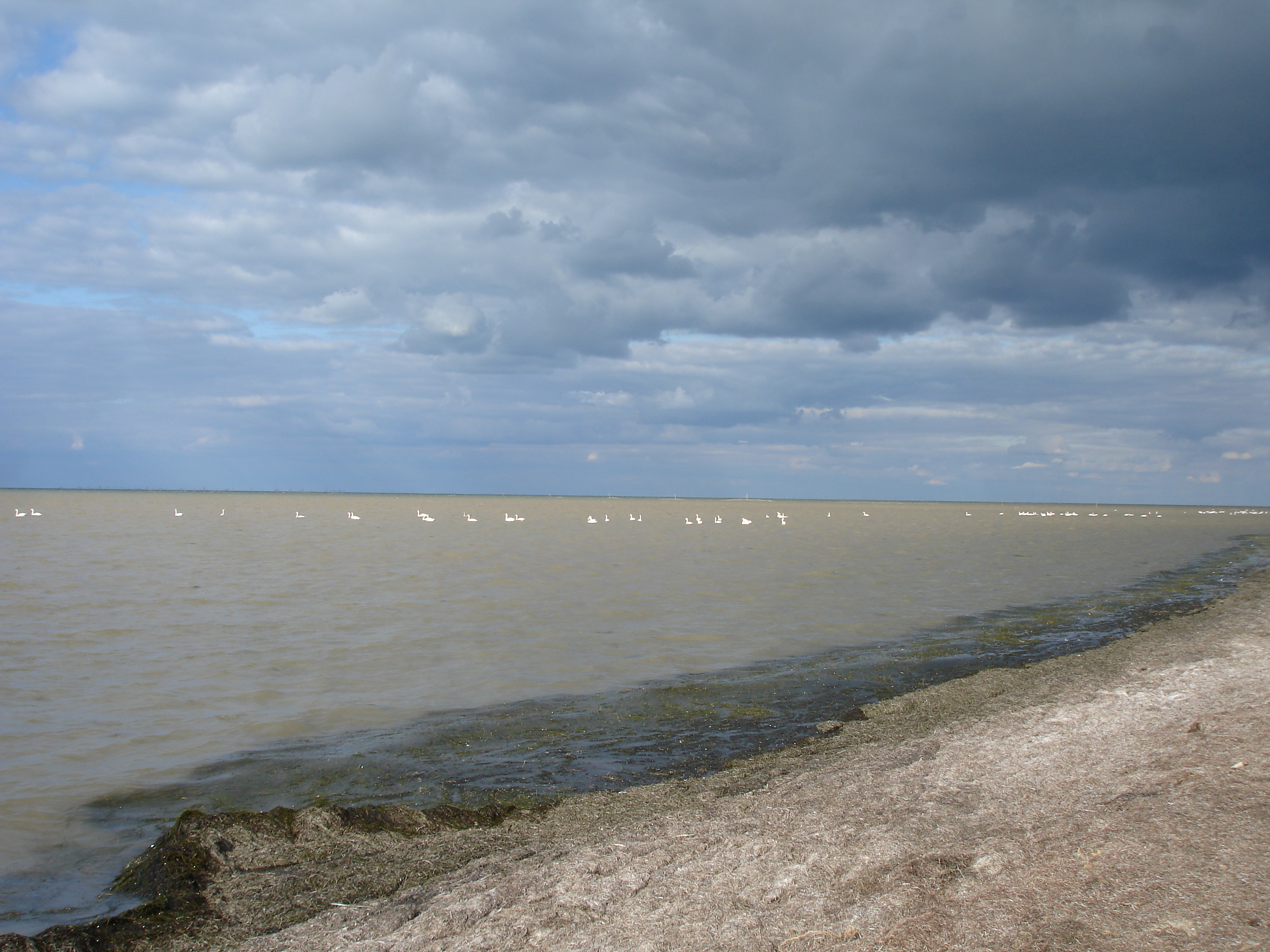
Swans in the reserve

Karkinitsky Reserve (Karkinit Bay Sanctuary, Ukrainian: Каркінітський заказник) is an ornithology zakaznik (protected area) located in the Karkinit Bay, Black Sea, between the southwestern Crimean Peninsula and mainland Ukraine.

It was established in 1979 (the area of 27 646 ha). The reserve has a mission to preserve the gene pool of the local flora and fauna, and also to protect the unique communities of wildlife. It is a resting place for migratory waterfowl in spring and autumn, and the habitat of nomadic birds in the winter.

Islands, which are surrounded by Karkinit's Bay shallow water and plenty of plant and animal food, attract a large number of waterfowl. There are more than 240 species of them: cormorants, herons, gulls, ducks, etc. Mute swans and whooper swans are the pride of the islands.

== See also ==
- Karkinitska and Dzharylgatska Bays
- Swan Islands Nature Reserve

== Sources ==
- http://ukraina-krym.com/index/0-19
- https://web.archive.org/web/20140107182706/http://www.nedaleko.ua/sight/
- http://www.megabook.ru/Article.asp?AID=637970
