= Bakotić, Bosnia and Herzegovina =

Village in Maglaj, Bosnia and Herzegovina

Bakotić Бакотић
- Village
- Location within Bosnia and Herzegovina
- Coordinates: 44°32′N 18°09′E
- Country: Bosnia and Herzegovina
- Entity: Federation of Bosnia and Herzegovina
- Canton: Zenica-Doboj
- Municipality: Maglaj

Area
  - Total: 3.20 sq mi (8.28 km^{2})

Population (2013)
  - Total: 89
  - Density: 28/sq mi (11/km^{2})
- Time zone: UTC+1 (CET)
  - Summer (DST): UTC+2 (CEST)

Bakotić (Serbian Cyrillic: Бакотић) is a village in the municipality of Maglaj, Bosnia and Herzegovina.

== Demographics ==
According to the 2013 census, its population was 89.

Ethnicity in 2013
Ethnicity	Number	Percentage
Serbs	84	94.4%
Croats	3	3.4%
other/undeclared	2	2.2%
Total	89	100%
