= Orli =

- Gender: Feminine
- Language: Hebrew

Origin
- Meaning: "My light"

Other names
- Variant form: Orly

Orli (Hebrew: אורלי) is a feminine given name, meaning "my light" in Hebrew. It may also be a nickname for the masculine name Orlando.

Notable people with the name include:

- Orli Wald (1914–1962), member of German Resistance to Nazi Germany
- Orli Shoshan (born 1974), Israeli film actress
- Orli Shaham (born 1975), Israeli-American pianist
- Orli Shuka (born 1976), British-Albanian actor
- Orli Auslander, British-born artist
- Orli Markman (born 1969), Israeli officer and judge

== See also ==
- Orly (name)
- Orly (disambiguation)
