= Karkinitska and Dzharylgatska Bays =

RAMSAR site (protected wetland) in Ukraine

- Location within Crimea
- Interactive map of Karkinitska and Dzharylgatska Bays
- Location: Ukraine (de jure) / Russia (de facto)
- Coordinates: 46°00′N 33°15′E
- Area: 147,556 hectares (364,619 acres; 1,476 km^{2}; 570 sq mi)
- Established: 1976

Ramsar Wetland
- Official name: Karkinitska and Dzharylgatska Bays
- Designated: 11-10-1976
- Reference no.: 114

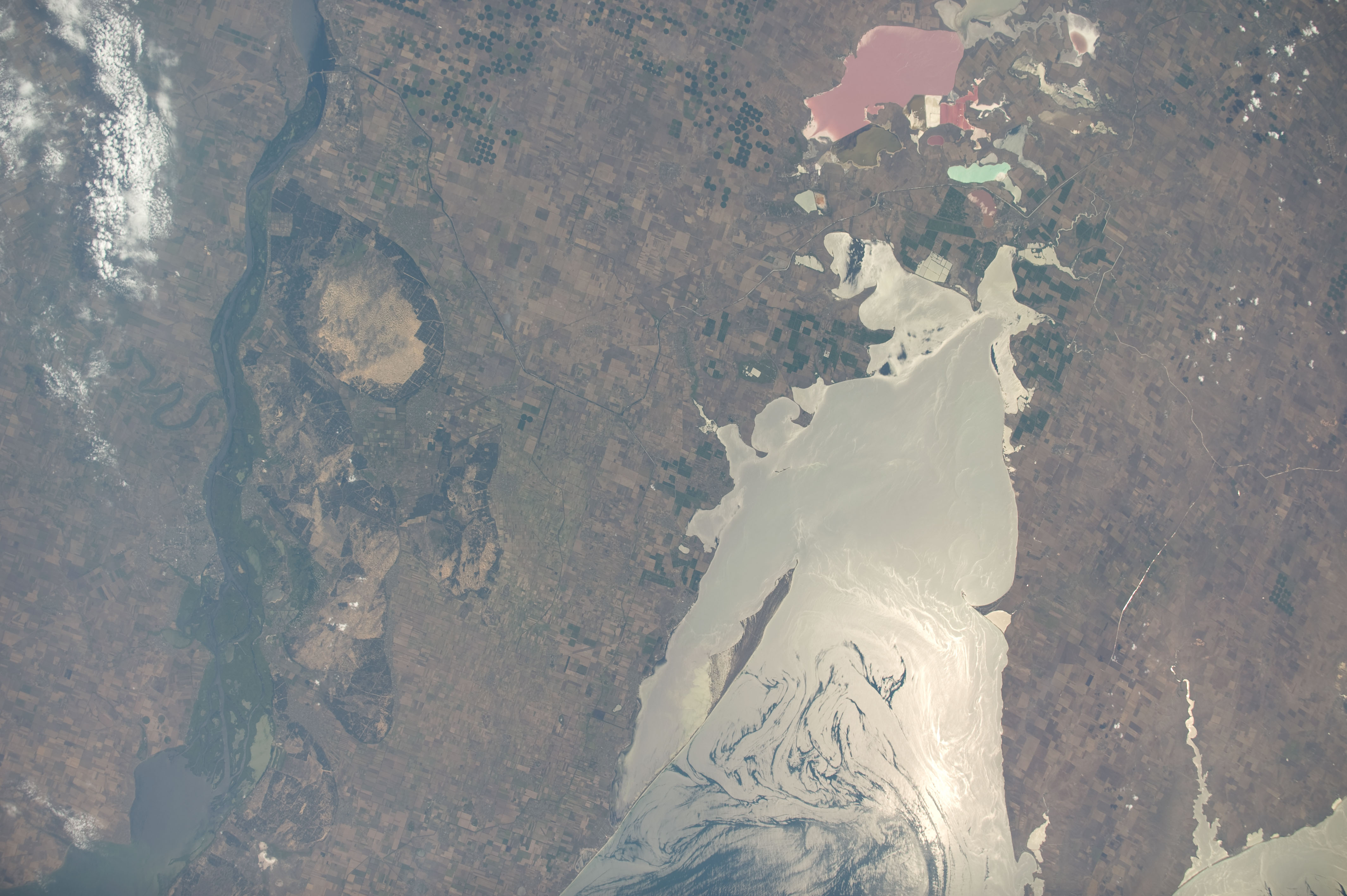
Satellite view of the area (North is to the left)

Karkinitska and Dzharylgatska Bays (also Karkinit and Dzharylgach Bays) is a RAMSAR site in Ukraine. The two bays (Karkinit Bay and (Dzharylhach Bay) in the Northern reaches of the Black Sea between the Ukrainian mainland and Crimea include several island spits and the Dzharylhach island, one of the largest uninhabited islands in Europe. Human activities (fishing, hunting grazing, etc.) are allowed.

Administratively, it is shared by the Kherson Region and the Autonomous Republic of Crimea.

There are the Dzharylhach National Nature Park based on the Dzharylhach island and the surrounding waters and the Lebedyni Islands ("Swan Islands") ornithological game reserve.

== See also ==
- Karkinitsky Reserve
- Media related to Karkinitsky Bay at Wikimedia Commons
- Media related to Gulf of Dzharylgach at Wikimedia Commons
