= Bakota Bay =

Bay located on the Dniester river

Coordinates: 48°35′N 26°56′E

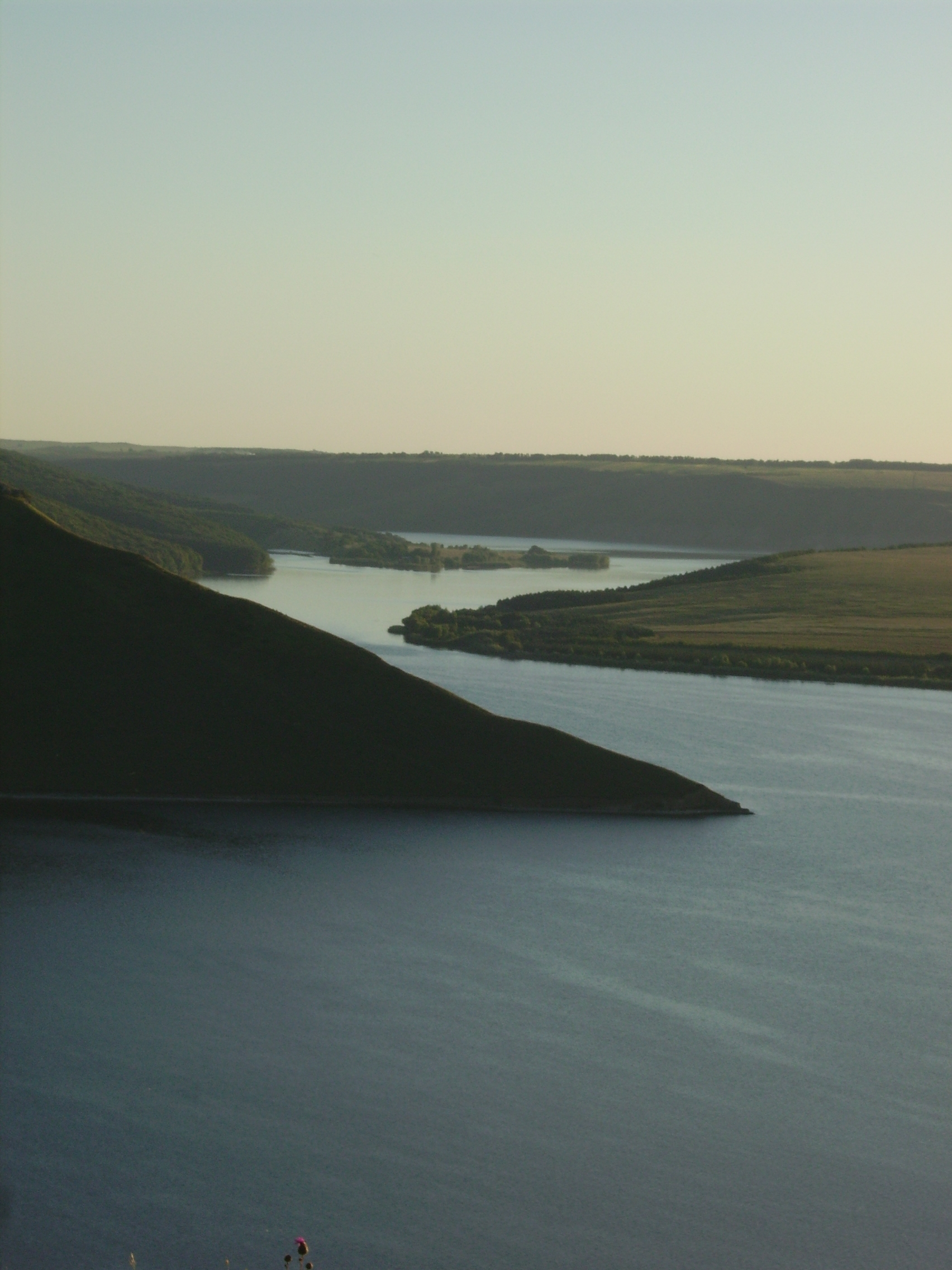

- Location within Khmelnytskyi Oblast Location within Ukraine
- Interactive map of Bakota Bay
- Location: Dniester River, Podilski Tovtry
- Ocean/sea sources: Atlantic Ocean
- Basin countries: Ukraine
- Max. width: 1,700 km (1,100 mi)
- Surface area: 1,590 ha (3,900 acres)
- Max. depth: 34 m (112 ft)

Ramsar Wetland
- Official name: Bakotska Bay
- Designated: 29 July 2004
- Reference no.: 1396

Bakota Bay (Ukrainian: Бакотська затока) is a bay located on the Dniester River that was formed after the construction of the Dniester Hydro Power Station. The bay is part of the Podilski Tovtry National Nature Park. Its area is about 1,590 ha (3,900 acres).

== Overview ==
Bakota Bay is located near the villages of Horayivka and Kolodiyivka, 50 km (31 mi) southeast from Kamianets-Podilskyi. Located in a river canyon, the ecological environment is typical of that of the upper Dniester basin.

== Flora and fauna ==
The bay plays an important role in the conservation of a number of rare species of Ukrainian plants and animals, as well as the spawning of fish.

Birds include both predatory (Eurasian goshawk; Eurasian sparrowhawk; Common buzzard; Short-toed snake eagle; Common kestrel) and migratory (Mallard; Mute swan; Great egret; Little egret; Wood sandpiper; Northern lapwing) species, among others.

== Physical and biogeographical characteristics ==
Bakota Bay is a designated continental biogeographical region within the European Emerald network. It is categorized as belonging to the East European province of the European broadleaf area and belongs to the mid-portion of the Dniester basin (upstream of Dniester Reservoir).

== Wetland physical features ==
The bay is located within the Volhynian-Podolian tectonic block. The geology of the bay is characterized by limestone, marl, sandstone, and shale, as well as granite and gneiss that are overlaid with loess. The surrounding area forms part of a gentle rolling loess plain. The area belongs to the West-Podolian region of West Podolian Province of the Podolian Forest-steppe zone. Soils are dark grey podzol and chernozems podzol, predominantly on loess rocks.

The bay was created in 1976 following the creation of the Dniester Reservoir on the Dniester River. It is 194 km (121 mi) long and holds a volume of 3 km^{3} (0.72 cu mi) of water. A buffer reservoir with a length of 17 km (11 mi) and a capacity of 0.031 km^{3} (0.0074 cu mi) is located downstream. The concentration of water minerals in upper Dniester varies around 205–570 mg/L (14.4–40.0 gr/imp gal). The water, which is of good quality, is used to supply Kamianets-Podilskyi.

== See also ==
- Bakota, Ukraine
