= Karkinit Bay =

Bay in Crimea

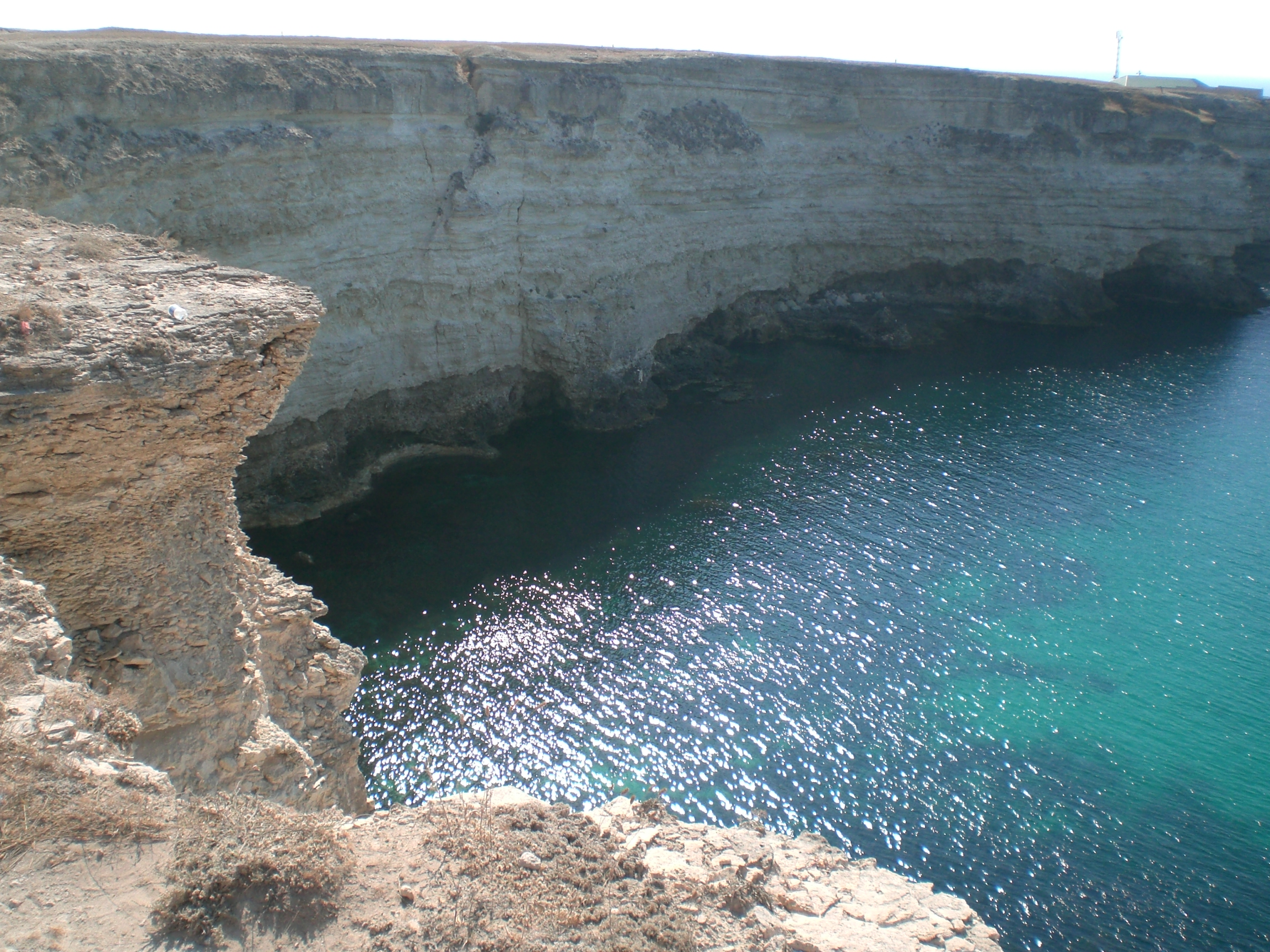
- Cape Tarkhankut is the southernmost point of the bay

- Location within Crimea
- Location: Black Sea
- Coordinates: 45°48′N 32°37′E
- Ocean/sea sources: Atlantic Ocean
- Basin countries: Ukraine; Russia (disputed)
- Max. depth: 35 m (115 ft)
- Salinity: 18 ‰
- Settlements: Skadovsk, Armyansk, Krasnoperekopsk

Ramsar Wetland
- Official name: Karkinitska and Dzharylgatska Bays
- Designated: 11 October 1976
- Reference no.: 114

Karkinit, Karkinitski, Carcinites, or Karkinitsky Bay (Ukrainian: Каркінітська затока, Karkinits'ka zatoka; Russian: Каркинитский залив, Karkinitskiy zaliv, Crimean Tatar: Karkinit körfezi) is a bay of the Black Sea that separates the northwestern Crimean Peninsula from the mainland Ukraine. It was named after the early Greek settlement of Kerkinitis (Κερκινίτης) on the Crimean coast in place of modern Yevpatoria.

The northeastern tip of the Karkinitis Bay, by the Isthmus of Perekop, is known as the Perekop Bay or Gulf of Perekop.

The bay contains the preserve Karkinits'ka Zatoka State Zakaznik.

On the Mercator 1569 world map, the bay is named as Golfo de Nigropoli after the city on north shores of the Pontus Euxeinus. Nigropoli was a city, which, as an 18th-century source says "was located on the Silch River that flows into Pontus Euxeinus to the west of the Crimea and forms its own gulf"; the mentioned river most probably being Dnieper.

According to Strabo, another name for the Gulf of Carcinites was the Gulf of Tamyraca.

It is part of the Karkinitska and Dzharylgatska Bays RAMSAR site.

== Gallery ==
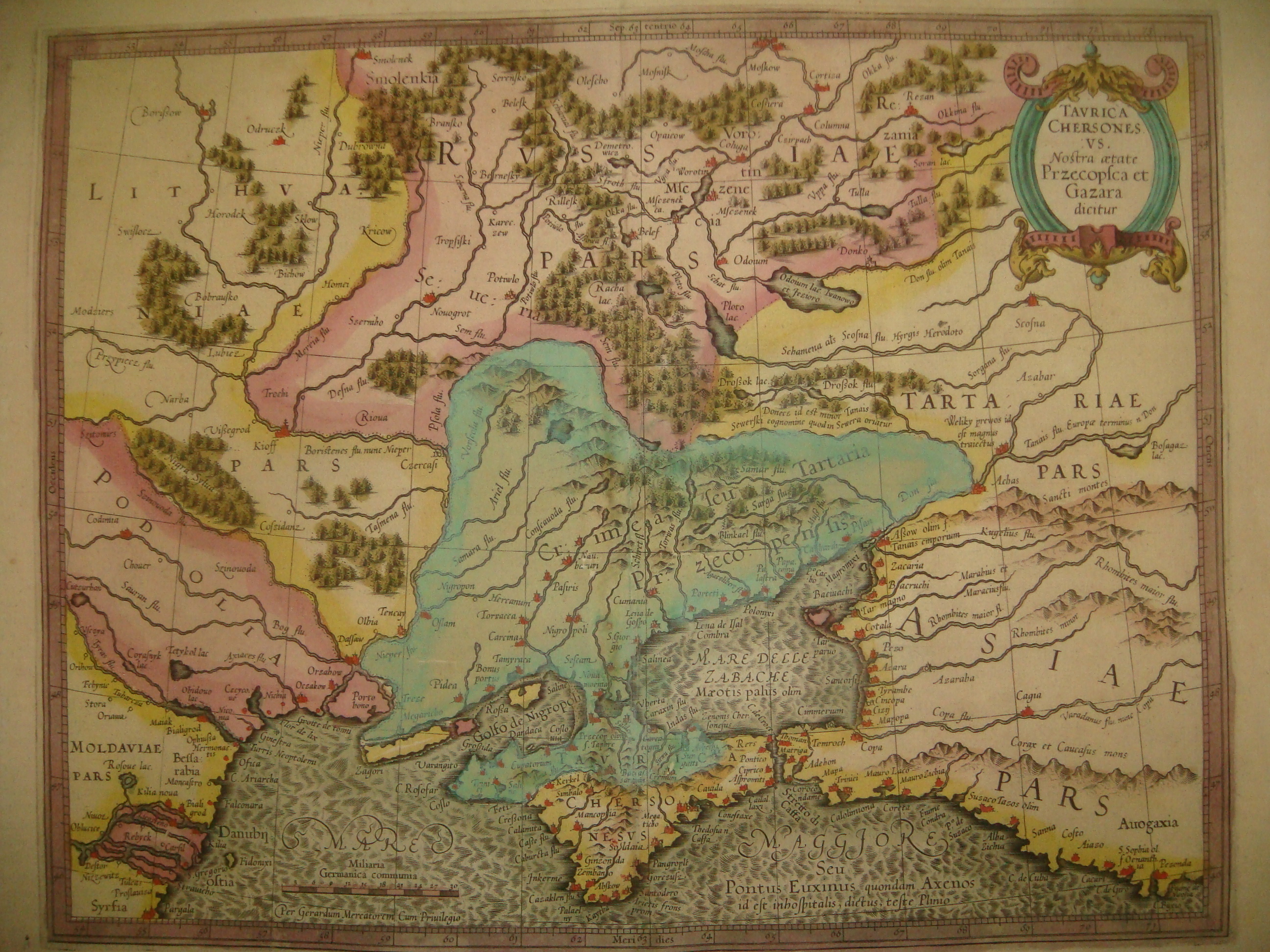
On Mercator's map it is named as Golfo de Nigropoli
