= Orly (name) =

Orly is a unisex given name. Notable people with the name include:

- Orly Castel-Bloom (born 1960), Israeli author
- Orly Goldwasser (born 1951), Israeli Egyptologist
- Orly Levy-Abekasis (born 1973), Israeli politician
- Orly Lobel, Author and professor of law
- Orly Mercado (born 1946), Filipino politician and broadcast journalist
- Orly Orlyson (born 1983), Icelandic space entrepreneur
- Orly Silbersatz Banai (born 1957), Israeli actress
- Orly Taitz (born 1960), dentist and lawyer
- Orly Weinerman (born 1971), Israeli actress

== See also ==
- Orli
