= Bakota, Ukraine =

Bakota Бакота
- Historic settlement
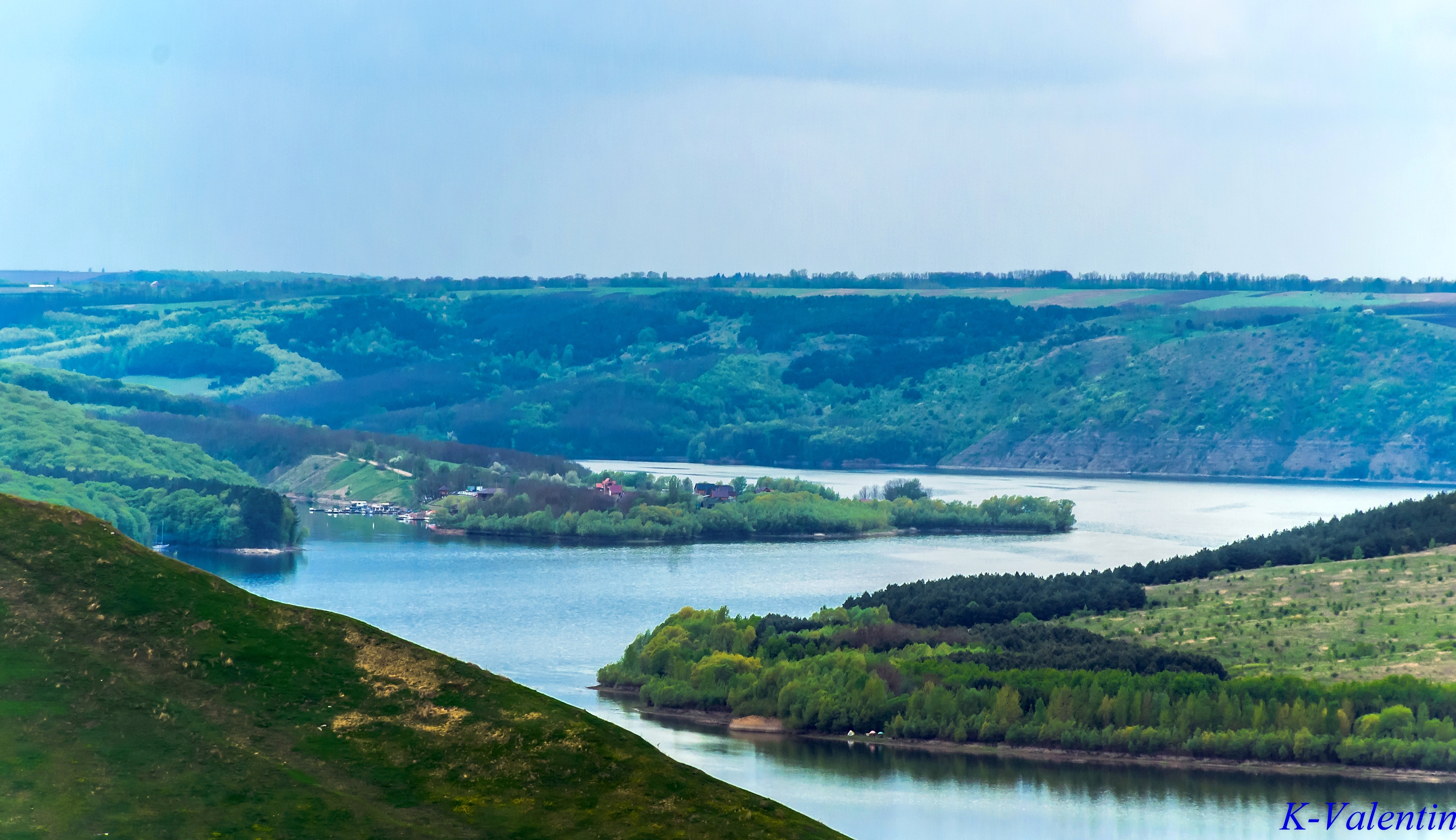
- The Dniester River's shore near Bakota's rocky hills.
- Interactive map of Bakota
- Coordinates: 48°35′35″N 26°58′44″E
- Country: Ukraine
- Oblast: Khmelnytskyi Oblast
- Raion: Kamianets-Podilskyi Raion
- First mentioned: 1240
- Elevation: 110–130 m (360–430 ft)

Population
  - Total: 0
- Time zone: UTC+2 (EET)
  - Summer (DST): UTC+3 (EEST)

Bakota (Ukrainian: Бакота) is a historic submerged settlement in Khmelnytskyi Oblast, western Ukraine. The village lies beneath the Dniester River and is located in the historic region of Podolia.

Bakota has a cave monastery, which includes frescoes and paintings dating back to the 12th–14th centuries, as well as preserved remains of monks. A Paleolithic archaeological site is also located near the village. Bakota is currently part of the National Environmental Park "Podilski Tovtry".

== History ==
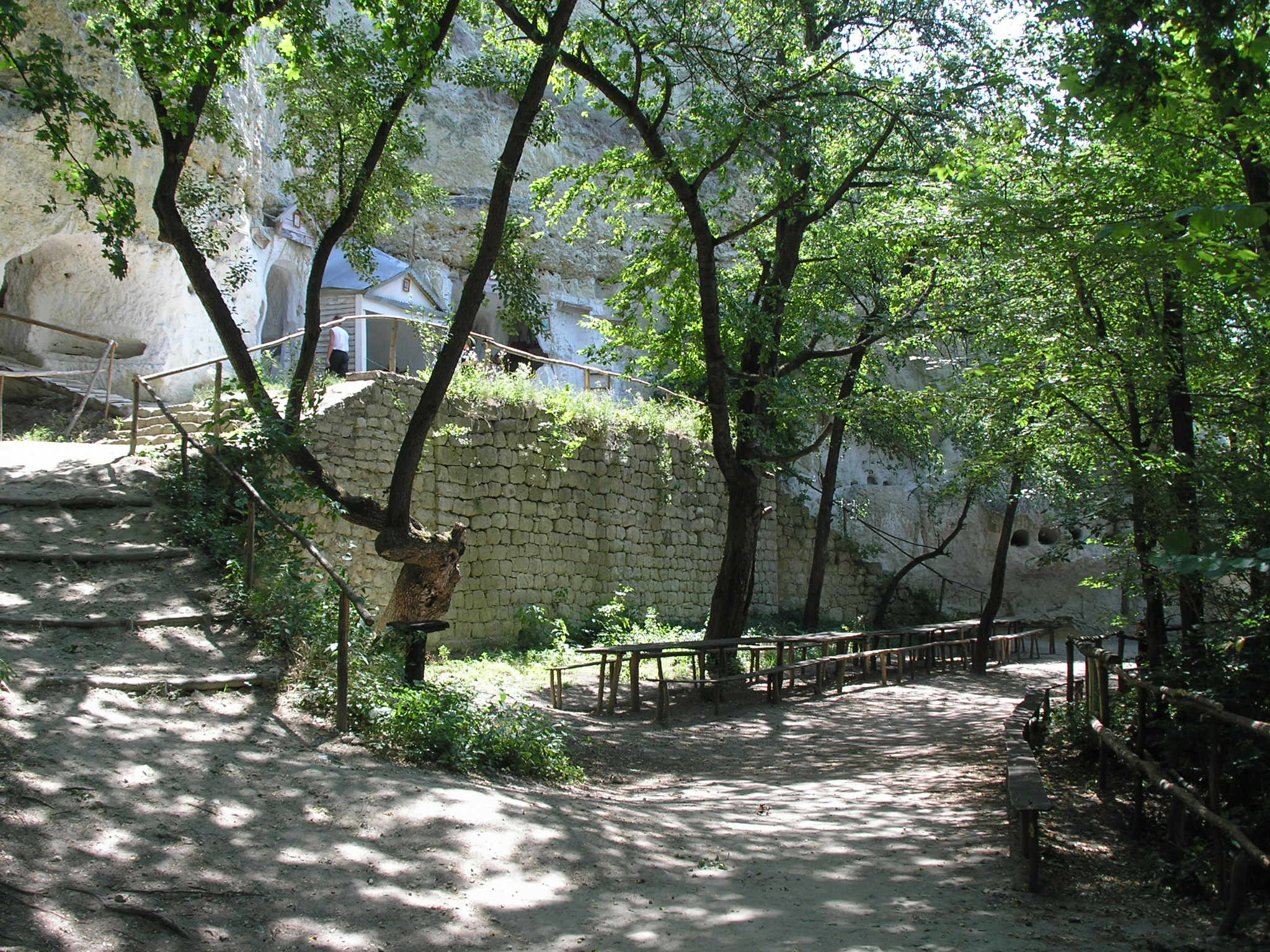
Bakota's cave monastery.

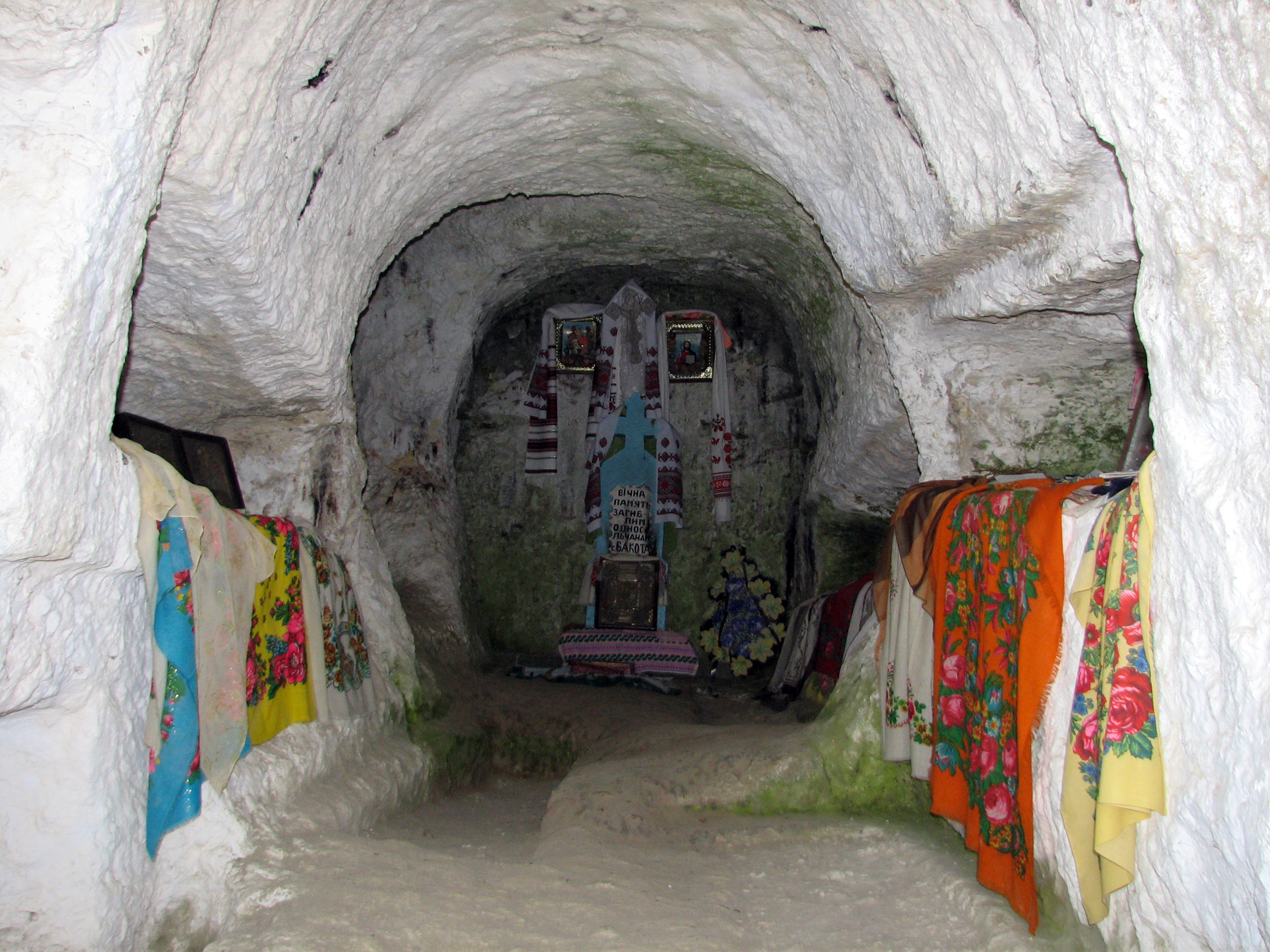
One of the caves at Bakota's cave monastery.

Local legend has it that the Bakota Cave Monastery was founded by Saint Anthony of Kiev, who also founded the historic Kiev Pechersk Lavra in 1051, now in Kyiv, Ukraine.

Bakota was first mentioned in the Hypatian Chronicle in the year 1240. When the town was first settled, the town was part of the state of Kievan Rus', until the middle of the 12th century when it became a part of Galicia–Volhynia. In the 13th century, Bakota served as the political and administrative center of the Dniester Lowland (Ponyzzia), which was at the time part of Galicia–Volhynia. The chronicle also mentions the rule of the Koriatovych dynasty over the area in 1362.

After being ruled by the Koriatovych dynasty, the town was controlled by Algirdas, a monarch of the medieval Grand Duchy of Lithuania. The Lithuanian Chronicle of 1362 mentions that a functioning cave monastery exists within the town. This motivated the construction of fortifications, to protect the town from Crimean Tatar raids. In 1431, Bakota was located and shared between the Grand Duchy of Lithuania and the Kingdom of Poland. Bakota's inhabitants later started a revolt and proclaimed their independence, which was crushed by Poland within three years The town's fortifications and castle were also destroyed.

In 1893, in place of a formerly standing church, a new wooden one was constructed, founded by the Episcop of Podillia and Bratslav Dmitry. The church was destroyed in 1960. On October 27, 1981, the village of Bakota was flooded when the New Dniester Hydroelectric Station was built. The village's inhabitants were moved from the area and re-settled not far away. In 1996, large portions of Bakota's rocky hills broke off and buried most of the village's ancient caves.

== Notable people ==
- Faina Melnik (1945–2016), Olympic champion discus thrower.
