= Serhiy Pavlovych Korolyov Museum of Cosmonautics =

Serhiy Pavlovich Korolov Museum of Cosmonauts
- Музей космонавтики імені Сергія Павловича Корольова

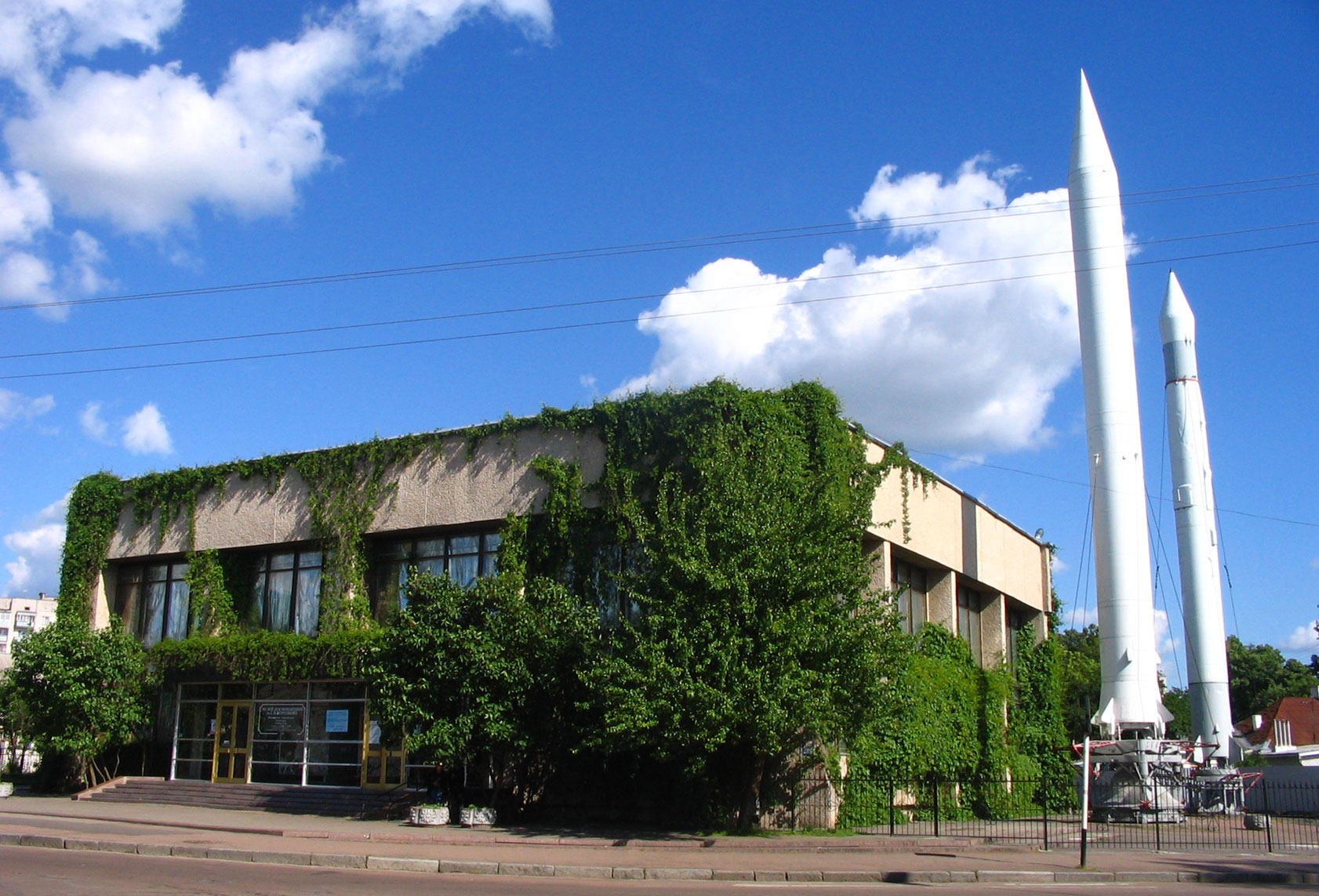
- Former name: Zhytomyr Serhiy Pavlovych Korolyov Museum of Cosmonauts
- Established: 1987
- Location: Zhytomyr, Ukraine
- Coordinates: 50.253627°N 28.677896°E
- Type: Technology museum
- Director: Iryna Dmytrivna Dyachuk
- Website: www.cosmosmuseum.info

Immovable Monument of Local Significance of Ukraine
- Official name: Будинок, в якому народився С. Корольов - вчений в галузі ракетобудування та космонавтики, конструктор (The house where S. Korolyov, a scientist in the field of rocketry and astronautics and a designer, was born)
- Type: Architecture, History
- Reference no.: 3942-Жт

The Serhiy Pavlovych Korolyov Museum of Cosmonautics (Ukrainian: Музей космонавтики імені Сергія Павловича Корольова) is a technology museum in Zhytomyr, Ukraine, dedicated to Serhiy Korolyov. Korolyov led the Sputnik project and was chief engineer for the Soviet Union's rocket and space program from the late 1950s until his death in 1966. He was born in Zhytomyr, then part of the Russian Empire (now Ukraine).

In 1970, the house in which Korolyov was born was dedicated as a memorial to him, a campus of the Zhytomyr Regional Museum. The museum achieved independent status in 1987, and the present museum building was constructed in 1991.

The museum houses around 11,000 exhibits related to rocket and space exploration, including the Soyuz 27 descent module, a small sample of lunar soil, full-size replicas of a complete Soyuz spacecraft, the Vostok 1 descent module, and the Lunokhod 2 lunar rover. From 2013, 2.5 million visitors have passed through the museum's doors.

Next to the exposition space, a rocket launches a geodetic version of the missile R-5 (8A62) (the rocket P5 was the first to carry a nuclear charge, and the last one to upgrade the A4 (Fau-2 missile) and the R-12 missile (8K63) (the first one was developed in the Dniepr) with an engine on high-speed components.

== Exhibitions ==
=== Learning the Moon ===
==== Automatic stations ====
The Luna-1 model (E-1 No. 4) is the first apparatus that passed the Moon at a distance of 6000 km

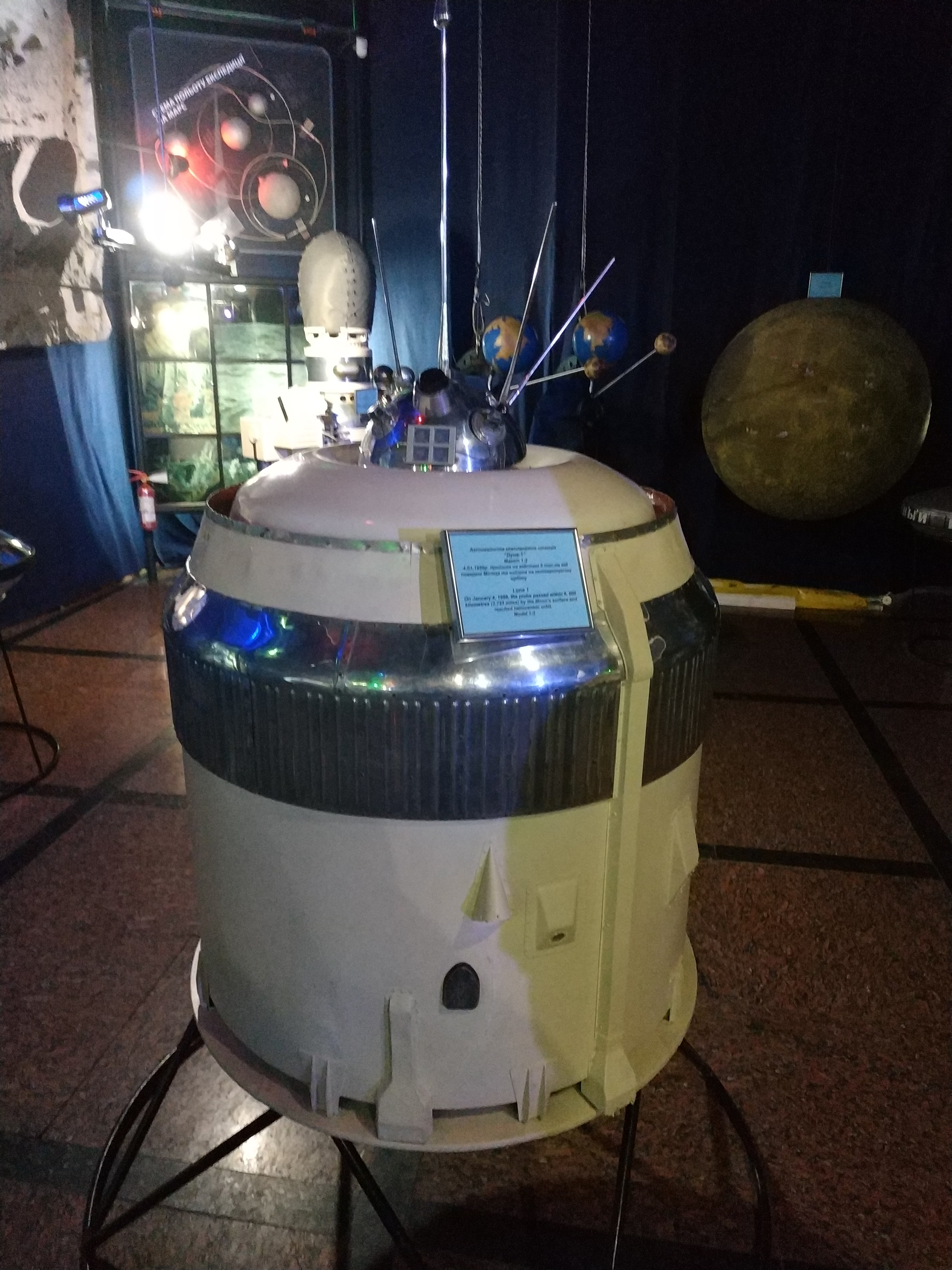

A copy of the pennant that delivered the Moon 2 device (E-1 No. 6) to the Moon

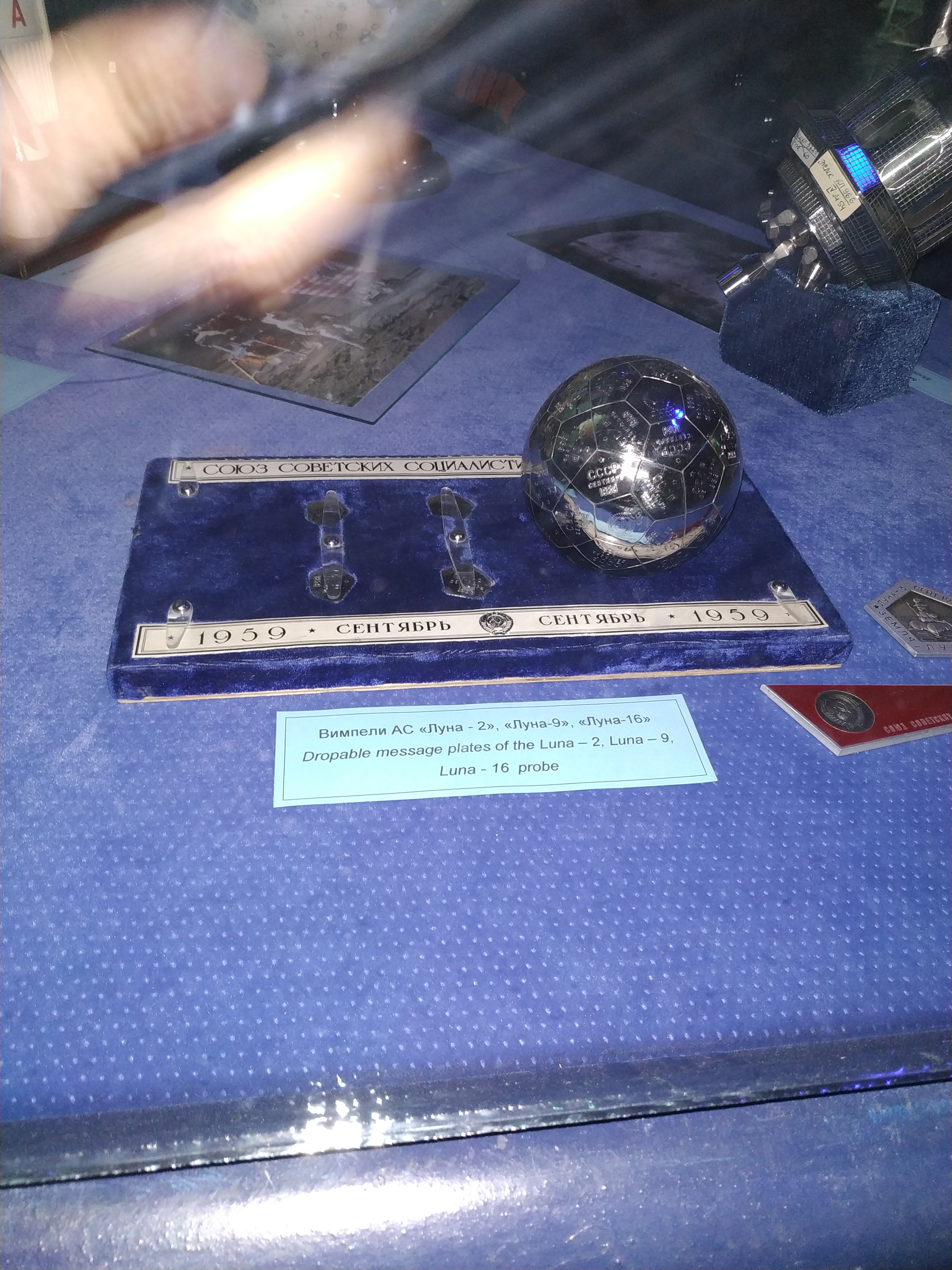

Model Luna-3E-2A No. 1 of the first apparatus, which photographed the reverse side of the Moon

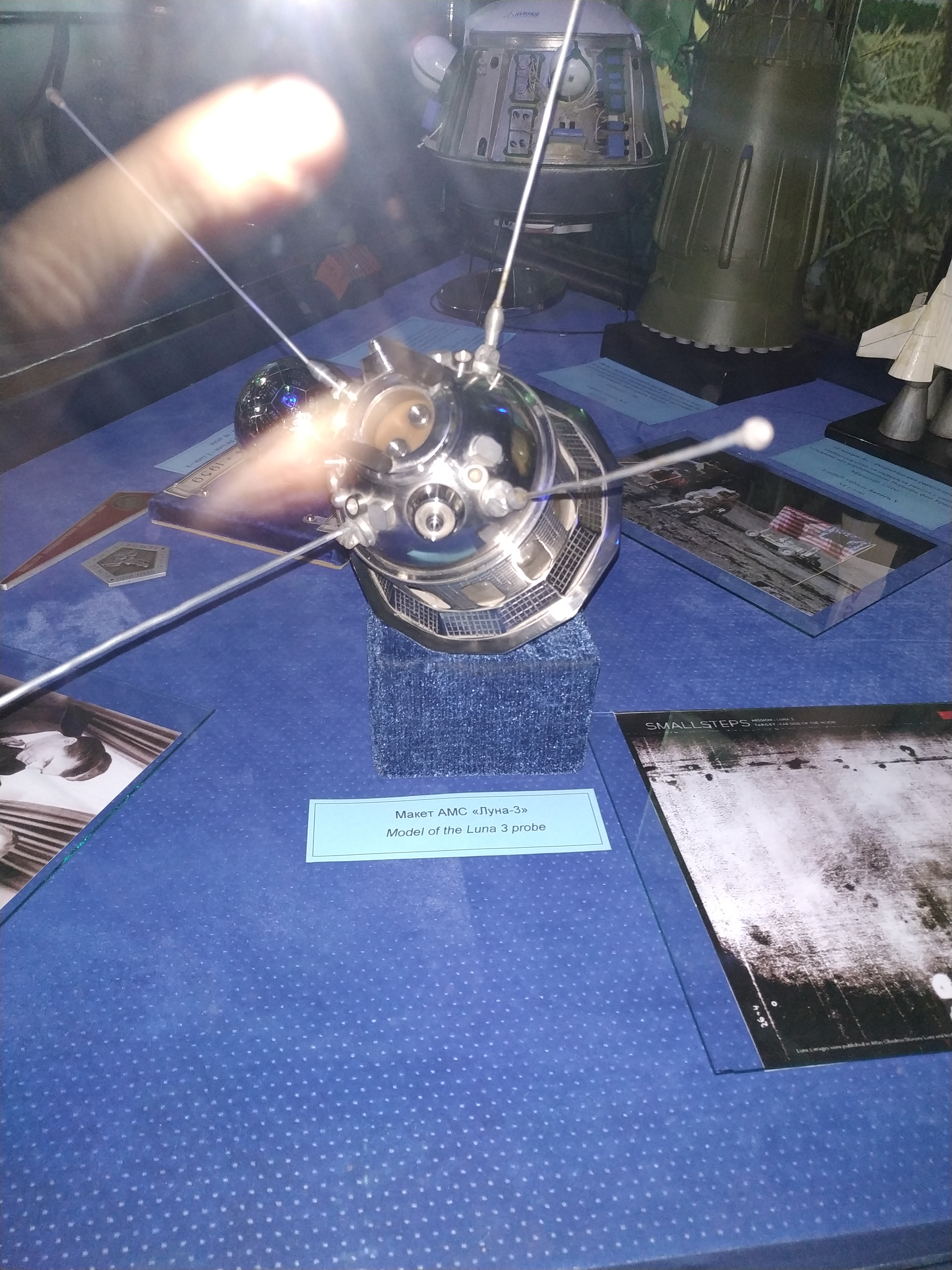

Luna-9 (Е-6 №13) the layout of the first apparatus, which makes a soft landing on the Moon.

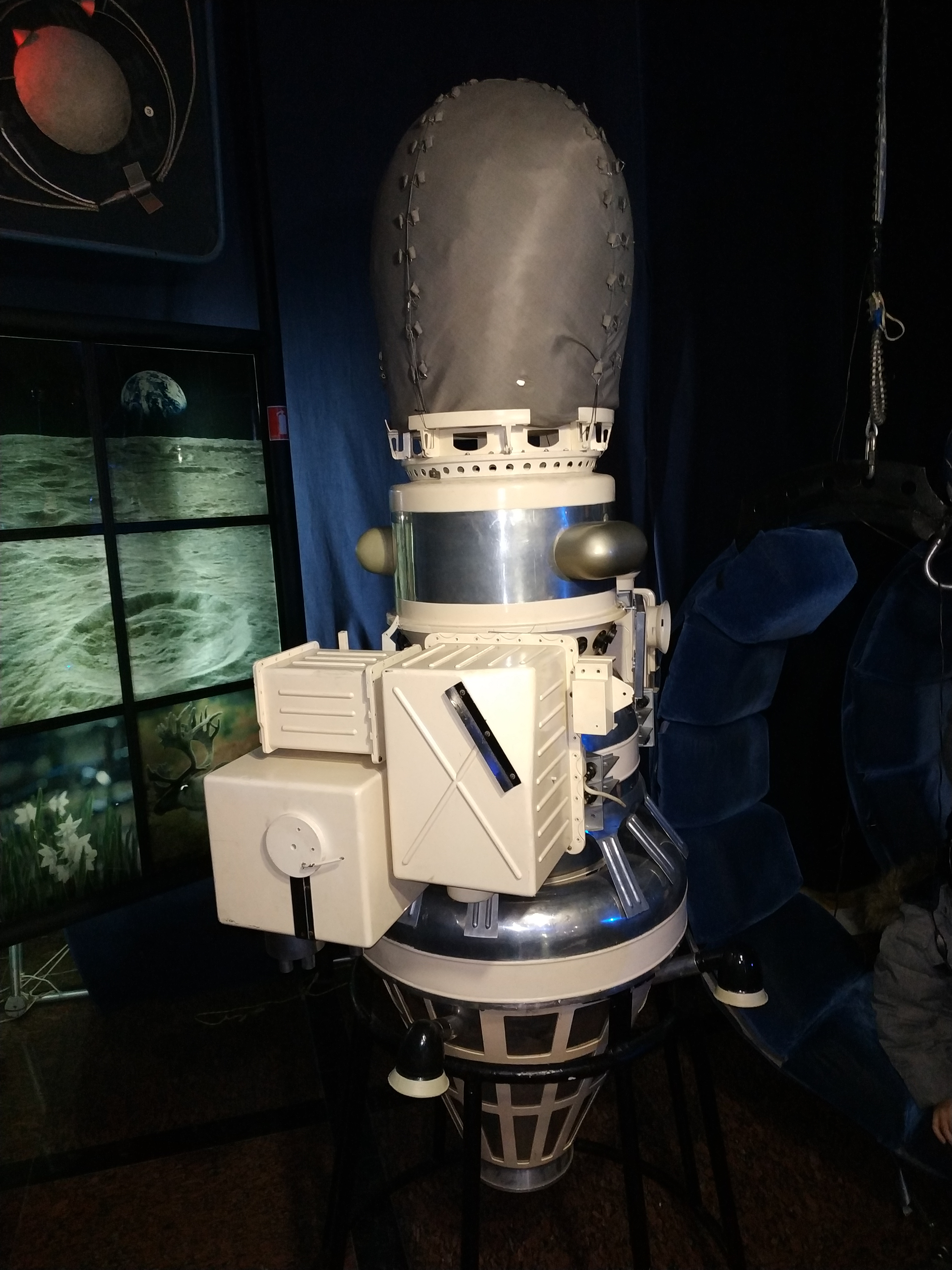

The Soviet automatic stations brought about 300 grams of the moon's soil, in the exposition there are samples of the moon's soil

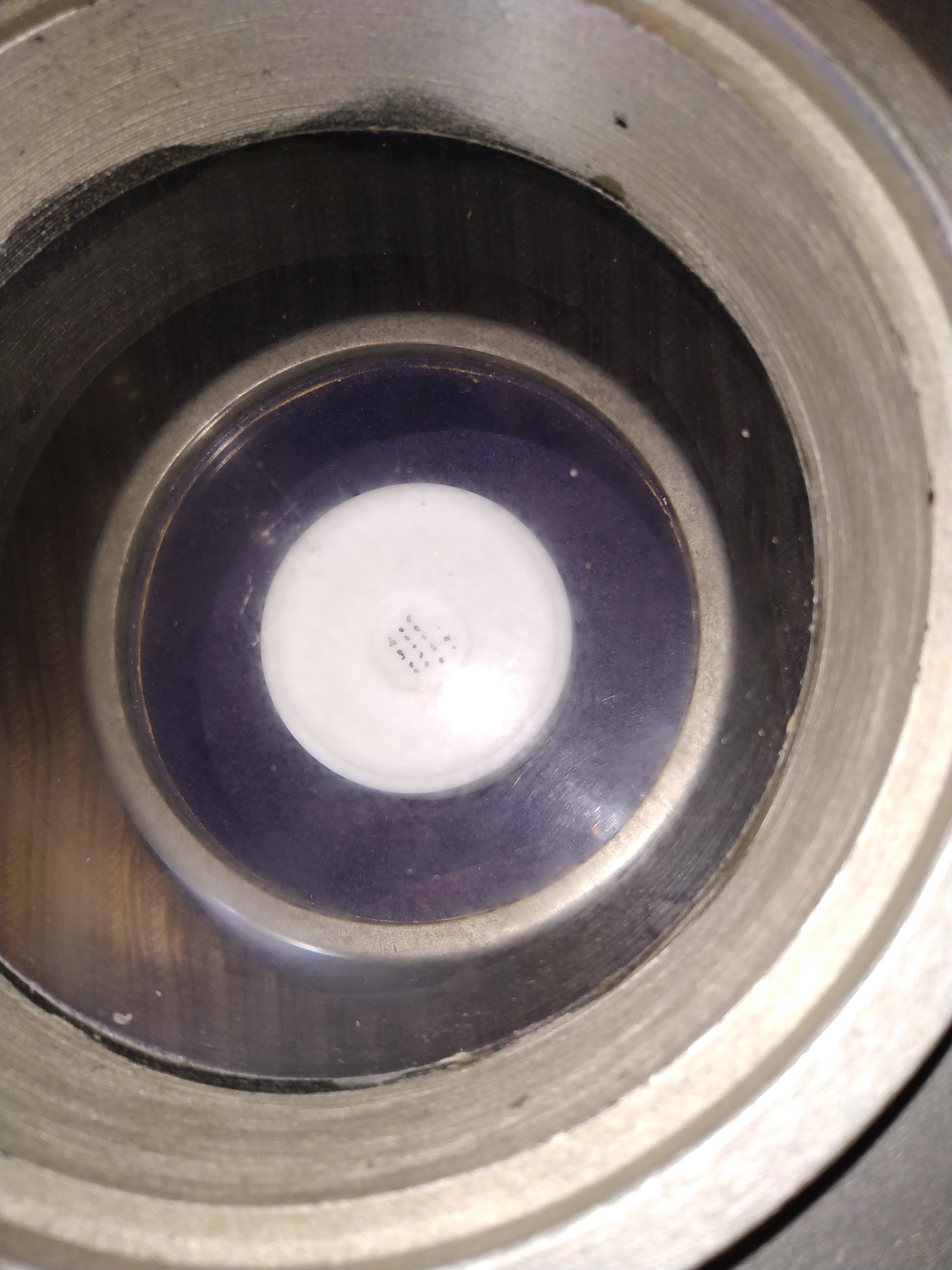

=== Moonlight Program (E8) ===
==== Lunokhod-2 layout ====
Low-directional decimetre antenna

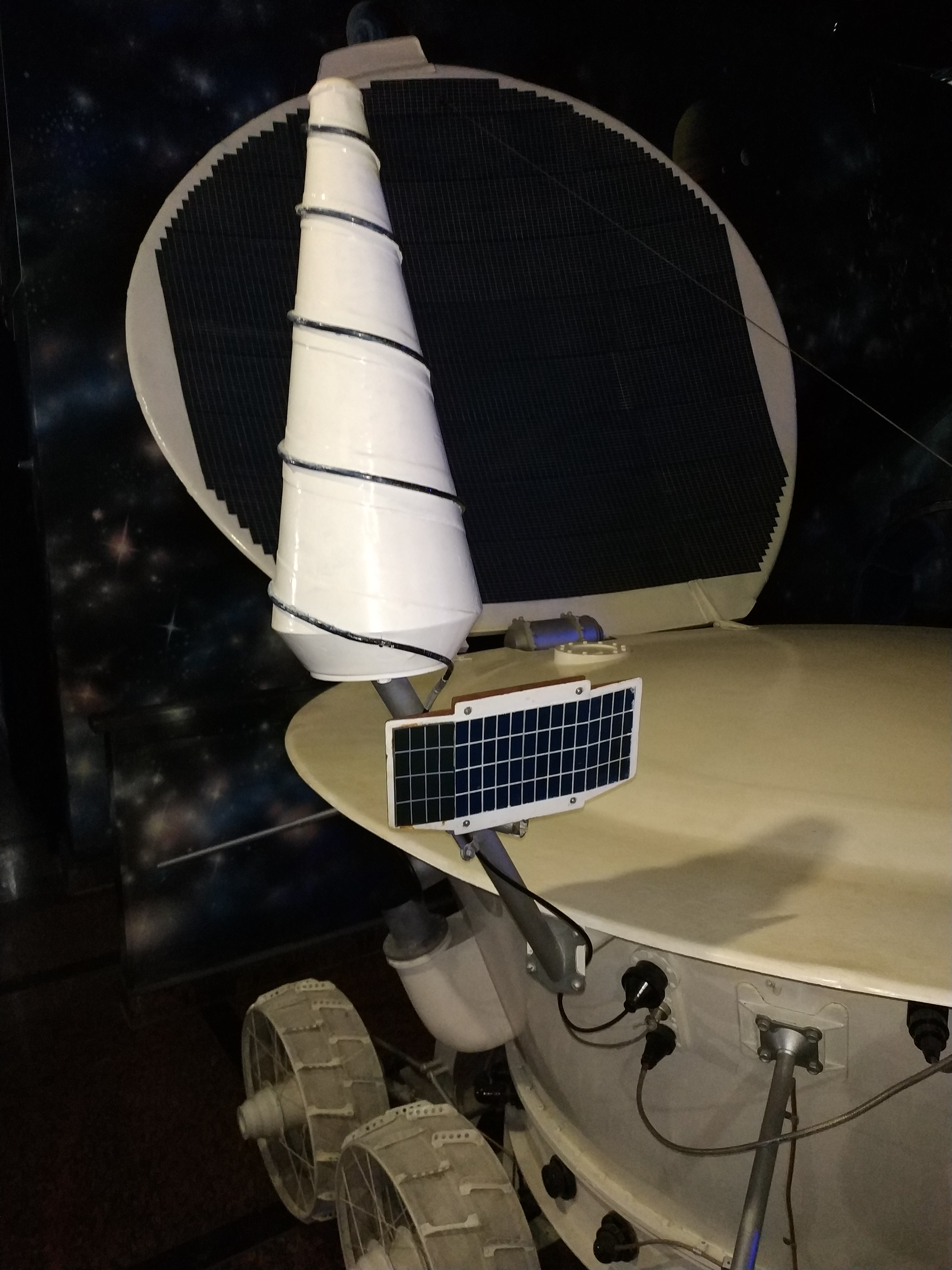

reflector Lunokhoda-2

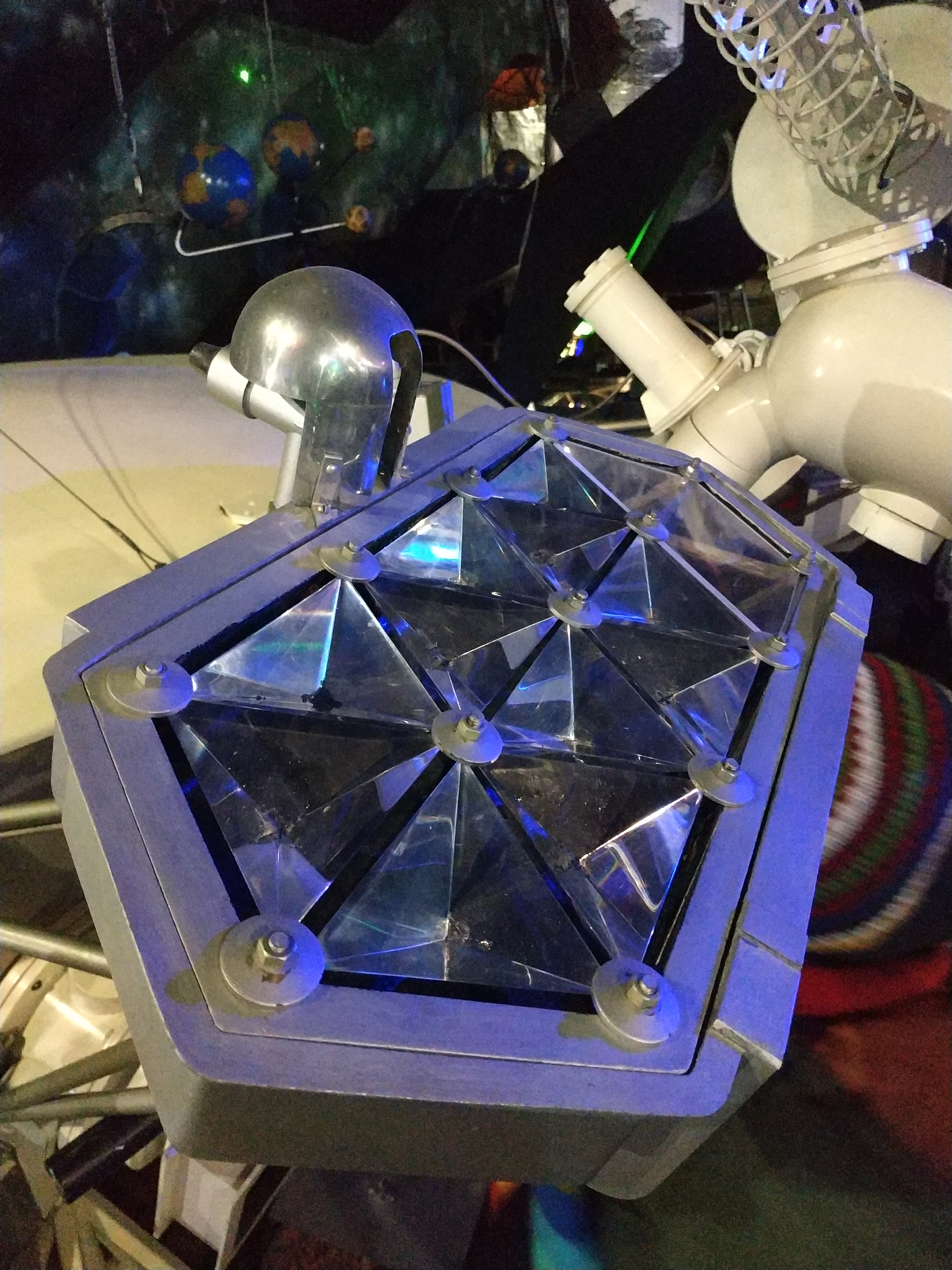

Gear of the Moonlight

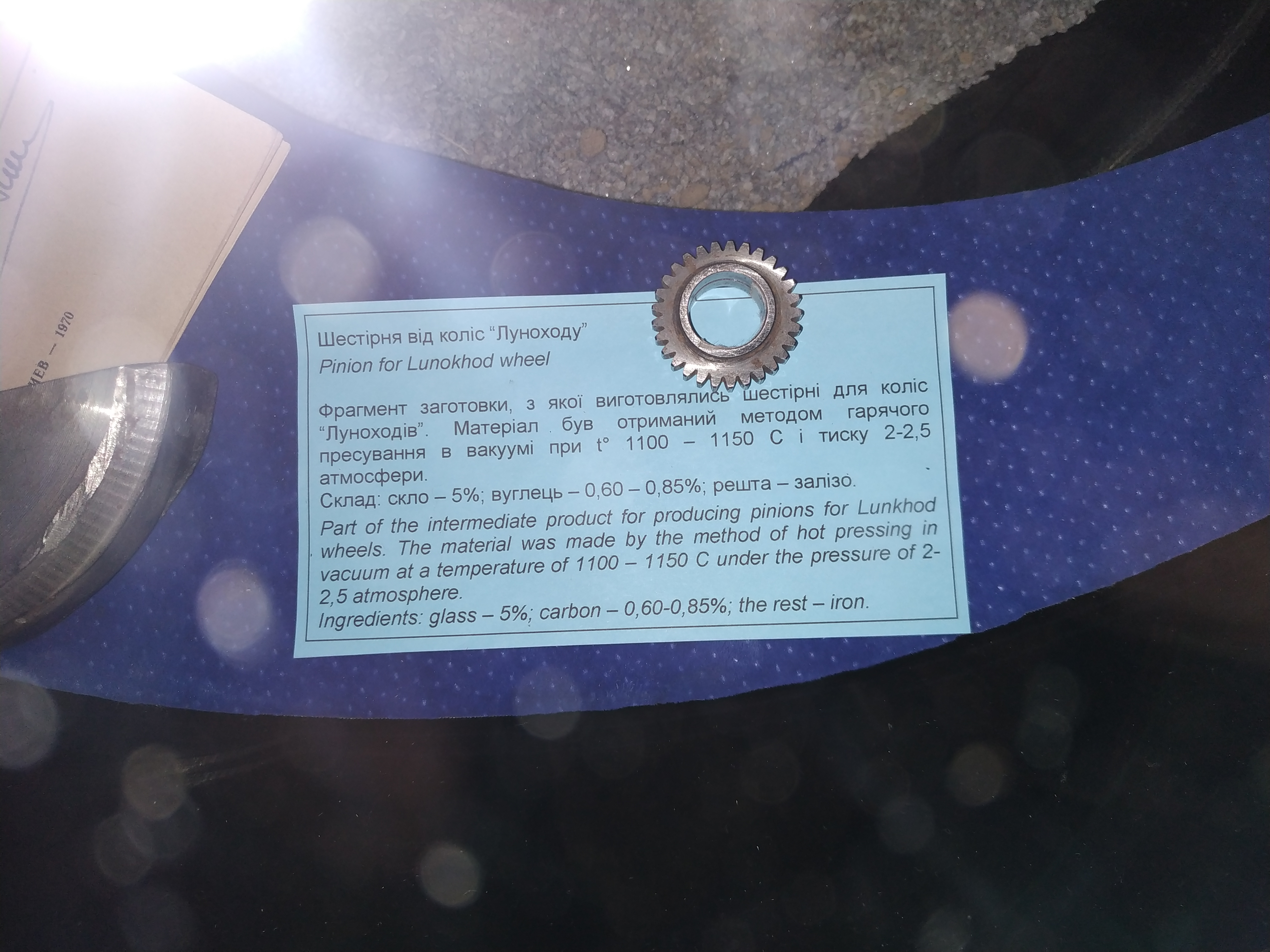

==== Monthly module E ====
There are mock-ups of the lunar module E from this program, which was developed in the Dnipro in Yuzhnoe

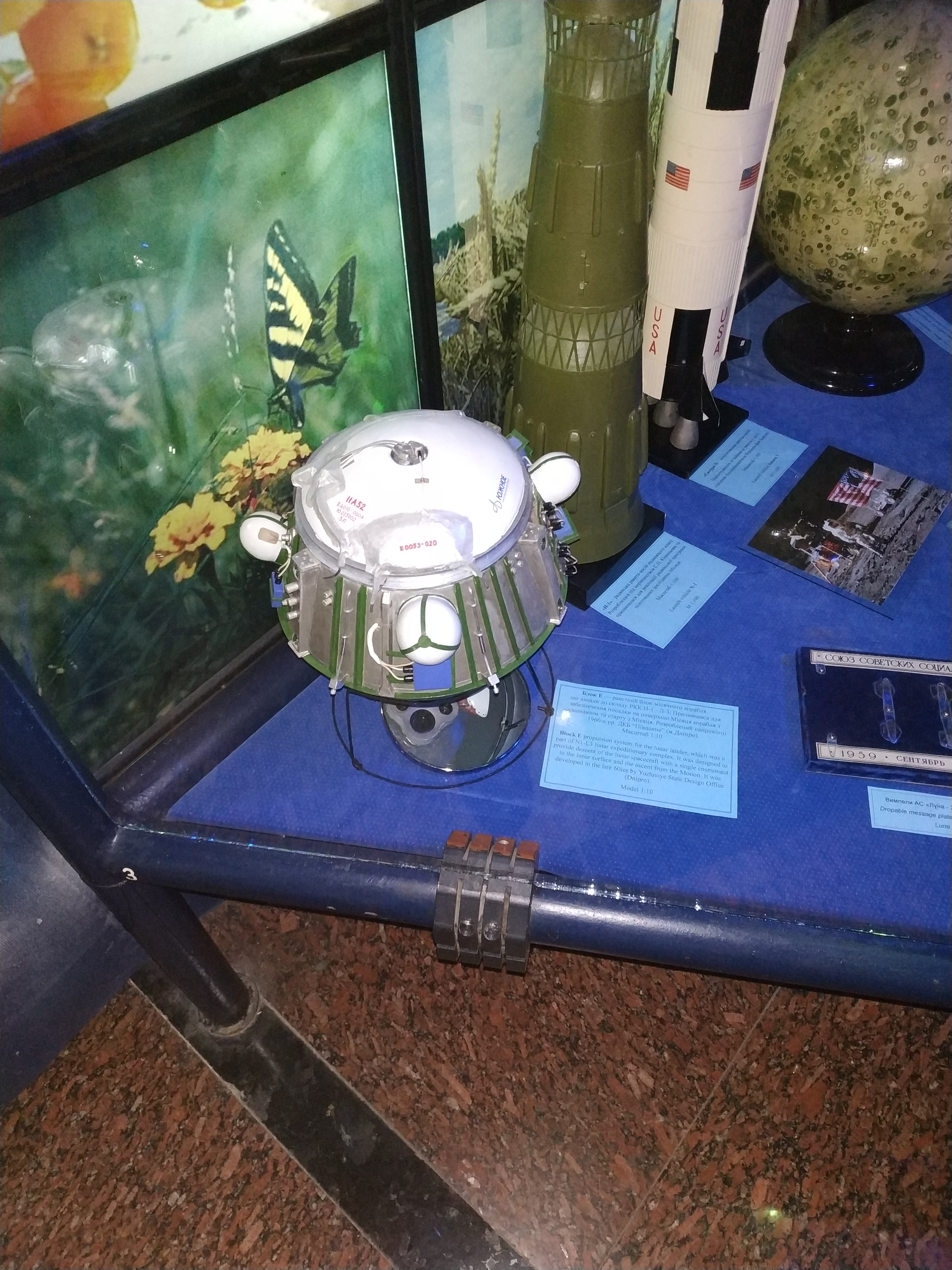
Спускаємий модуль Блок -Е

==== Rocket N1 ====
The layouts of the rocket N1u are comparable to Saturn V

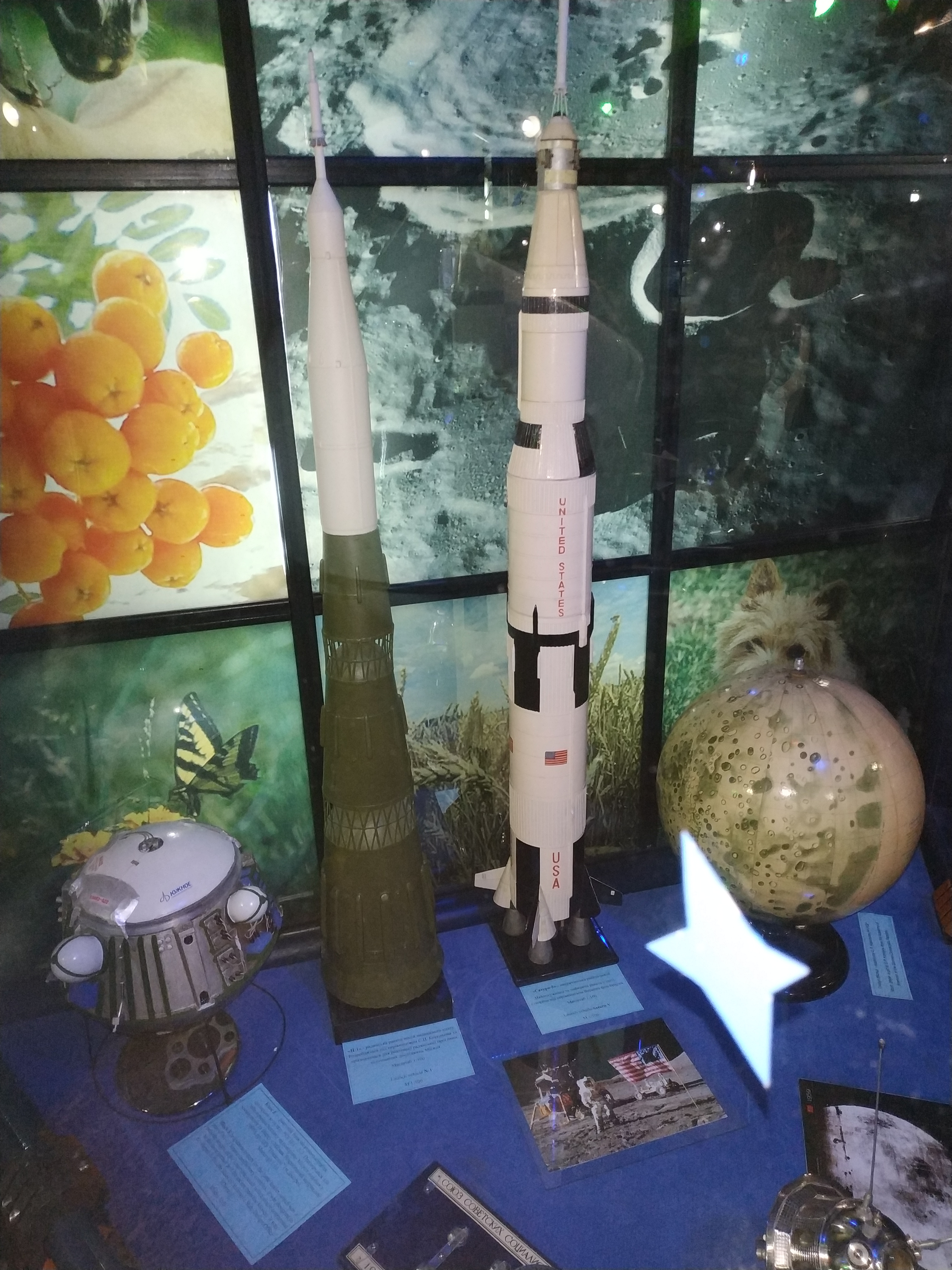

==== The tape recorder Malysh-B ====
There is a wire tape recorder Malysh-B (main designer Babich A.I.) with automatic start from the thing, and the possibility of blocking control. It was developed for the monthly program – a spacesuit krechet-94. Such a tape recorder and its modifications Malysh-BM was used later in the flights of astronaut Beregovoi.

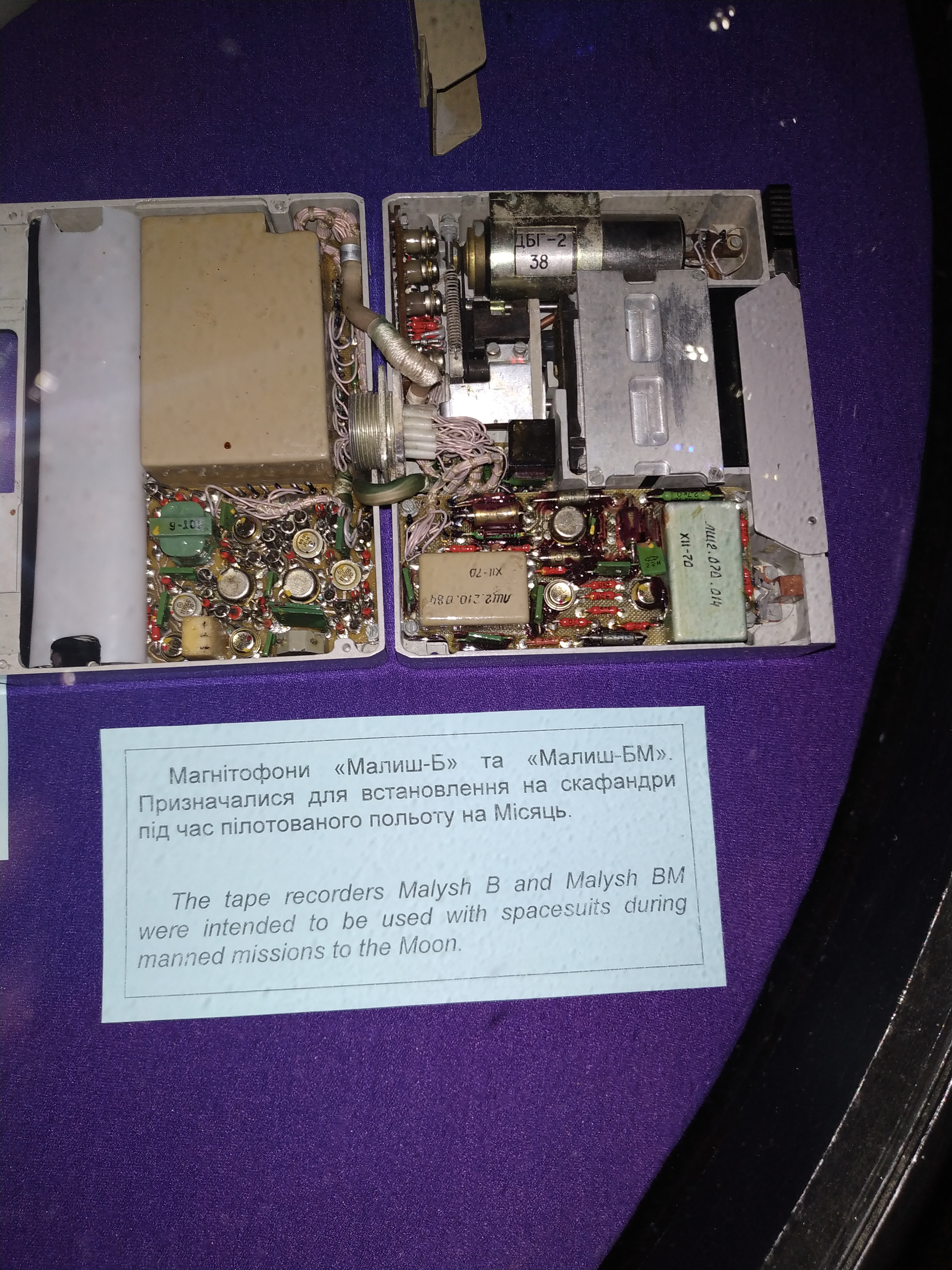

cassette for tape recorder

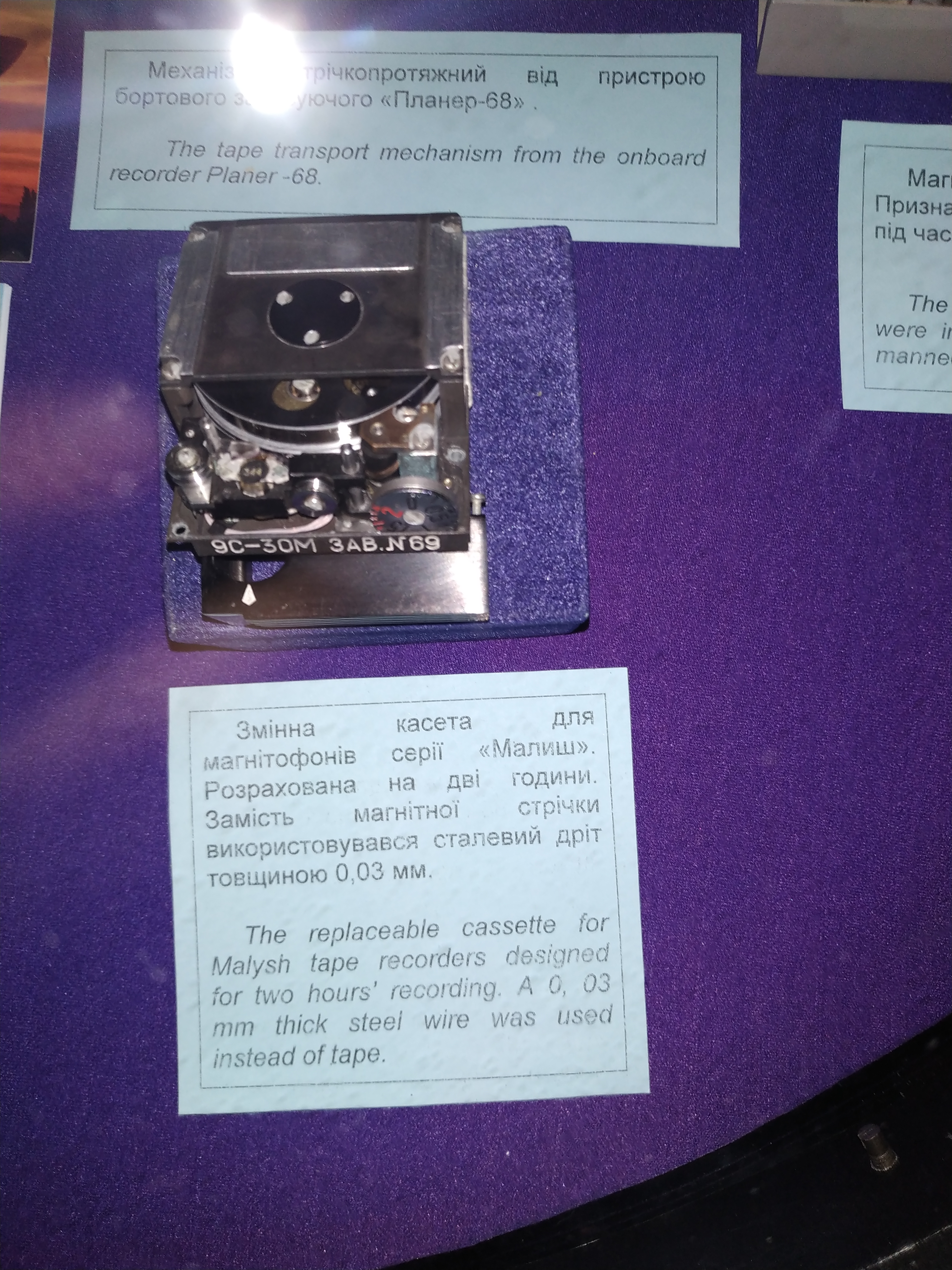

Flight scheme of Kondratyuk

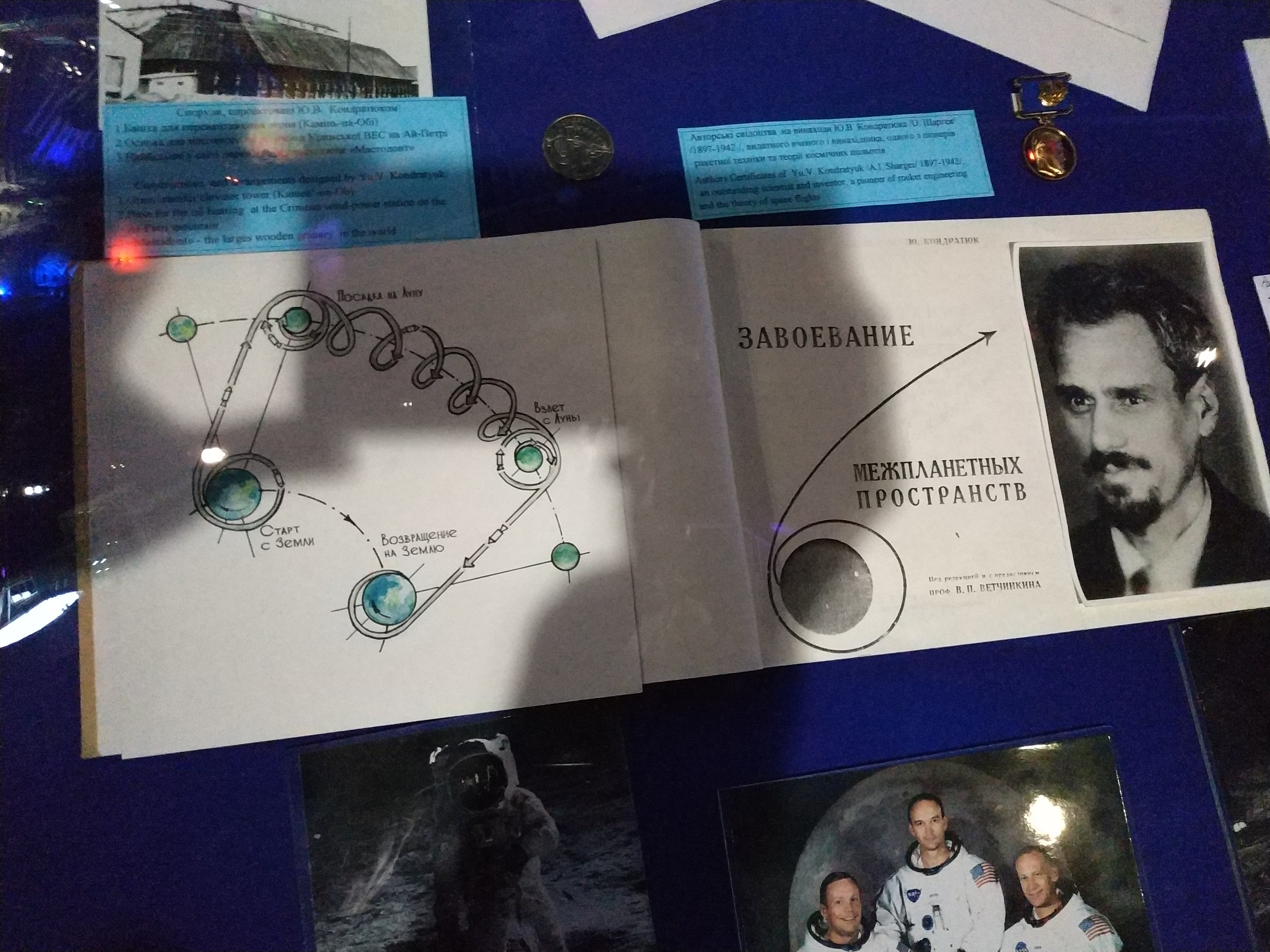

=== Study of Venus ===
==== Venus-7 ====
The layout of the Venera-7 apparatus, which was the first working spacecraft to land on another planet on 15 December 1970.

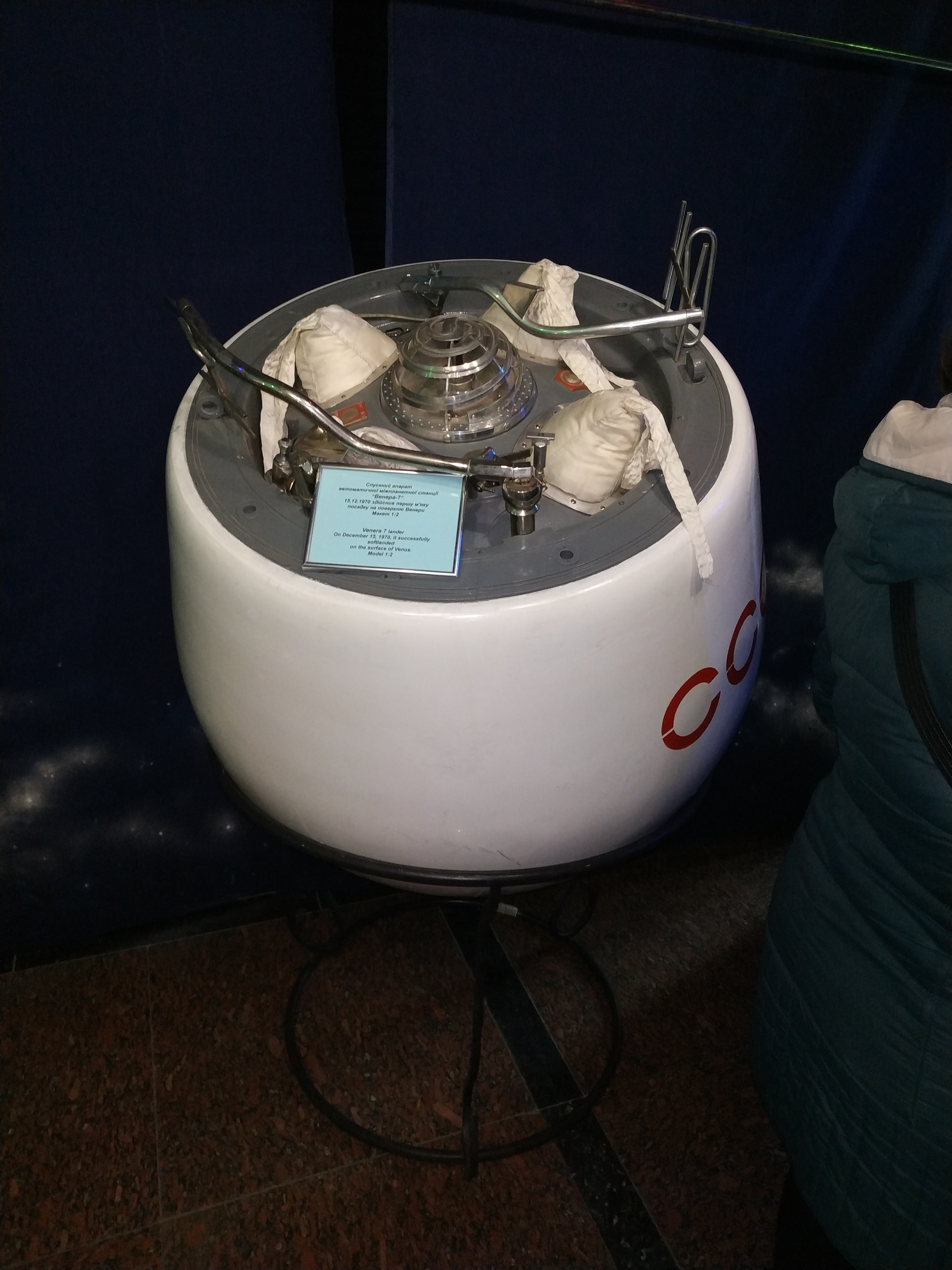

==== Vega ====
There is an exhibition of the descent device of the Vega program (Veener and Galileo), which in 1985 made a soft landing on Venus and transmitted the signal for 56 minutes. Another part of this program was the study of the comet of Galileo, at a speed of folding 70 km per second.

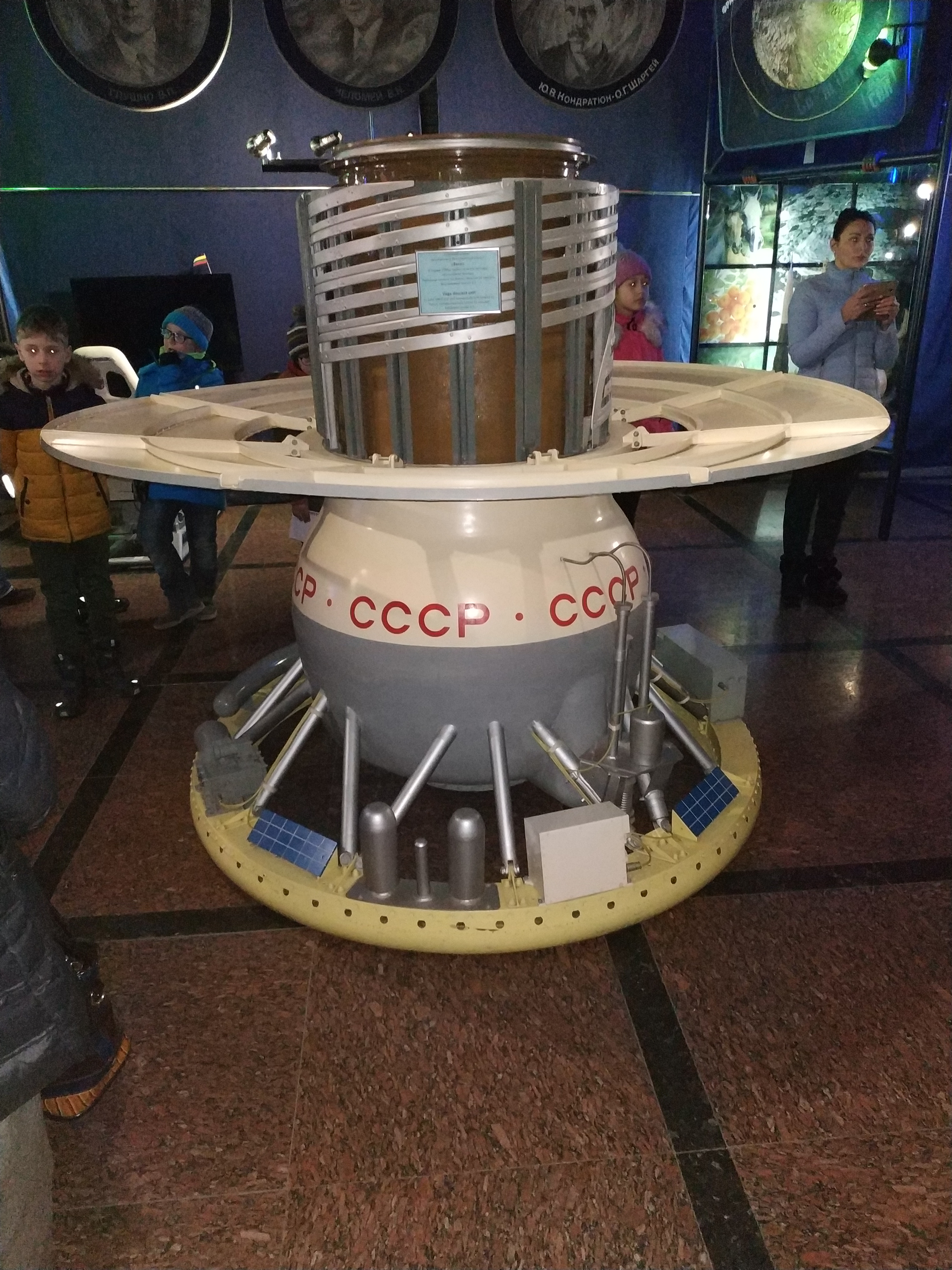

=== Study of Mars ===
Trajectory of flight to Phobos in 1988. Phobos program

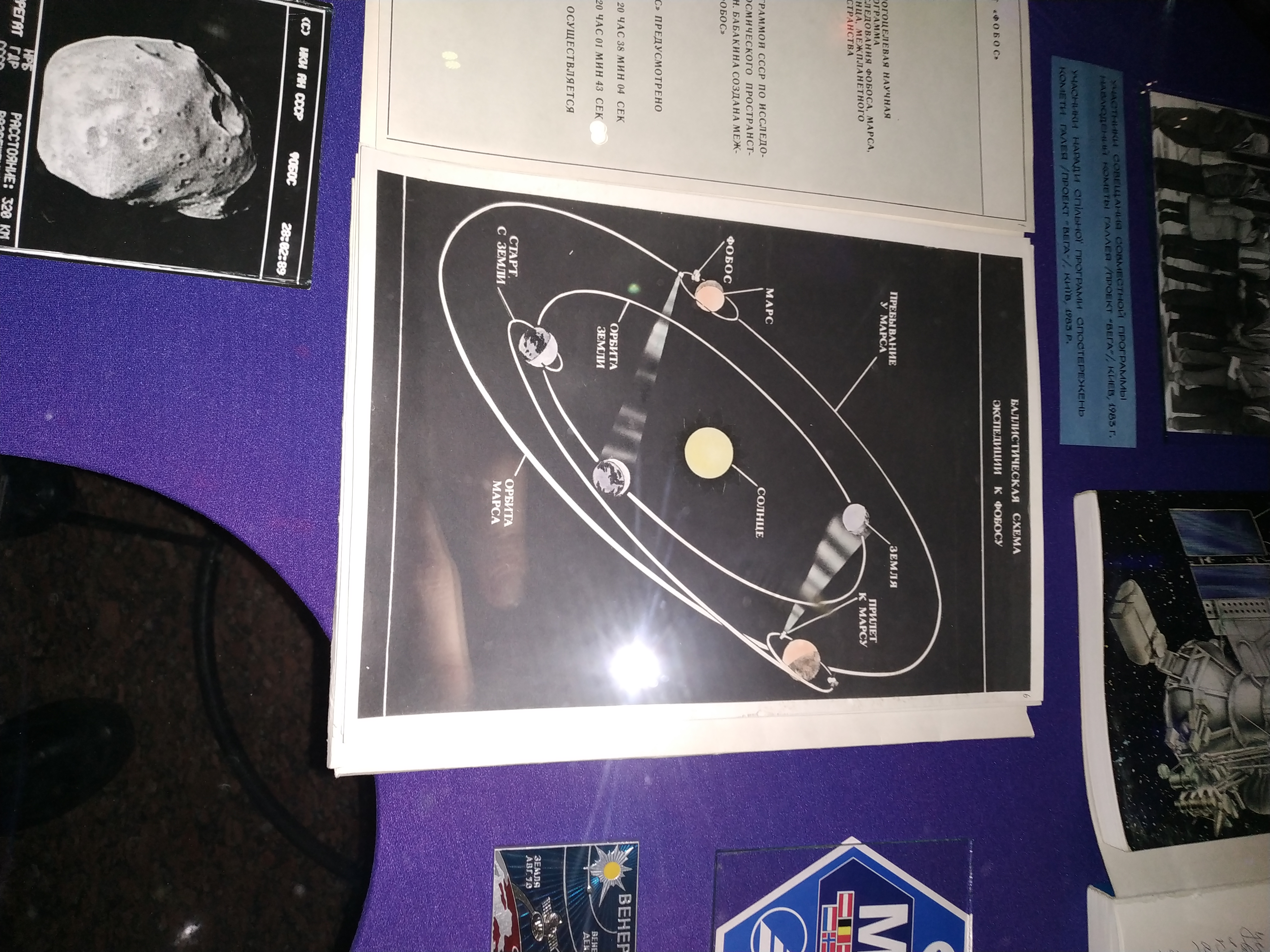

Trajectory of flight to Mars

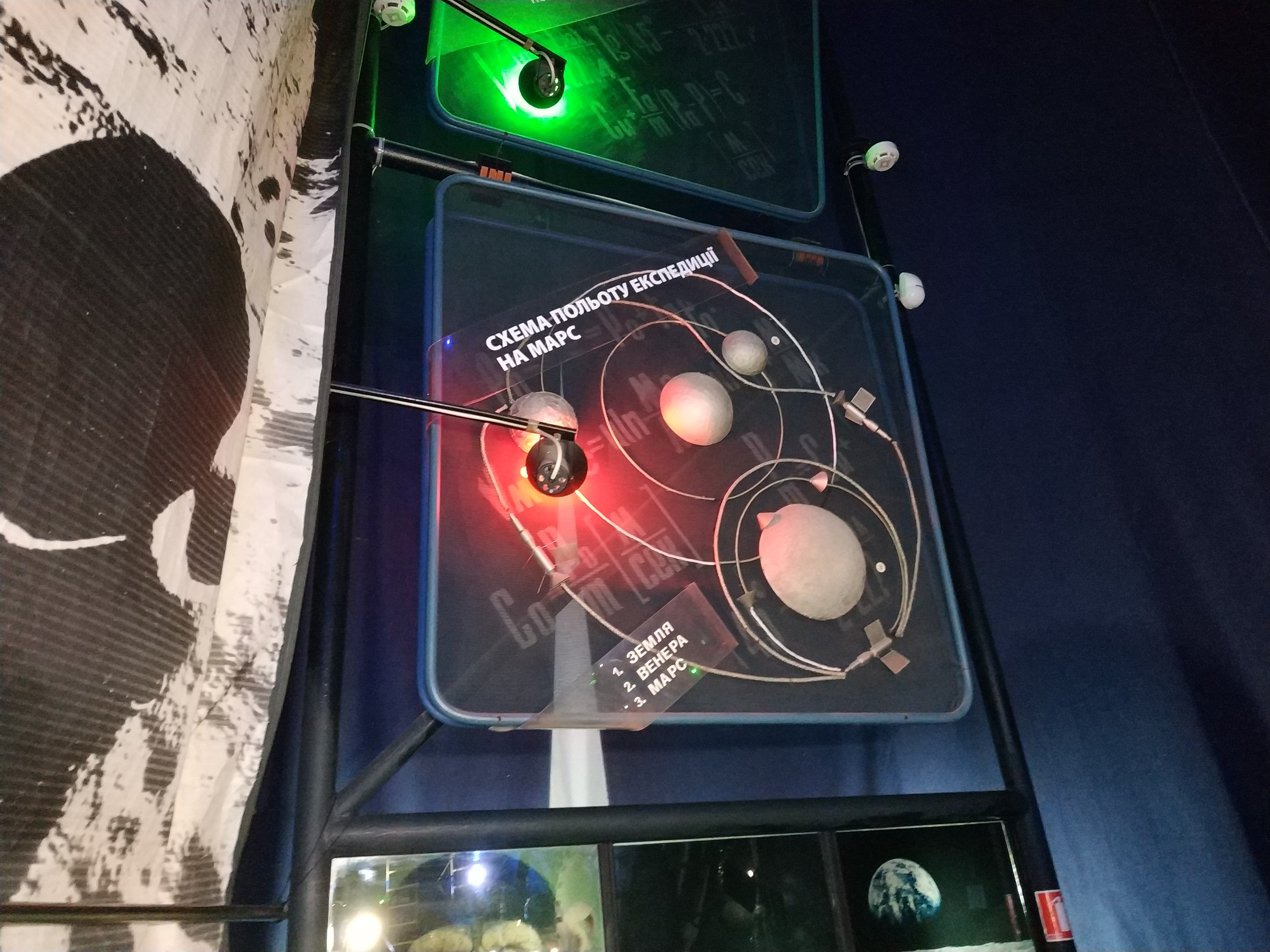

=== Layout of descent device Vostok-1 (first with a man aboard) ===
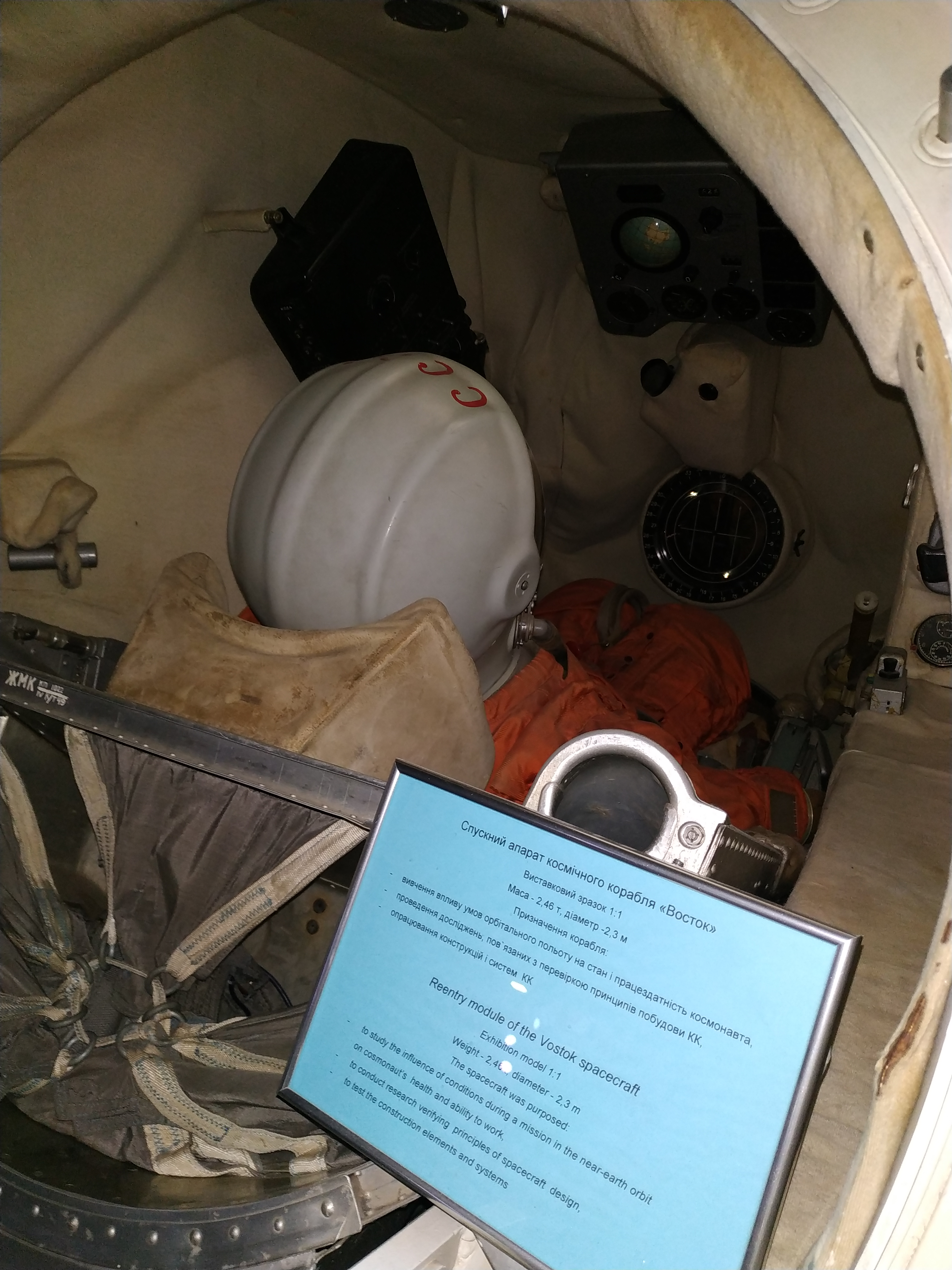

View of the porthole with a level of laziness

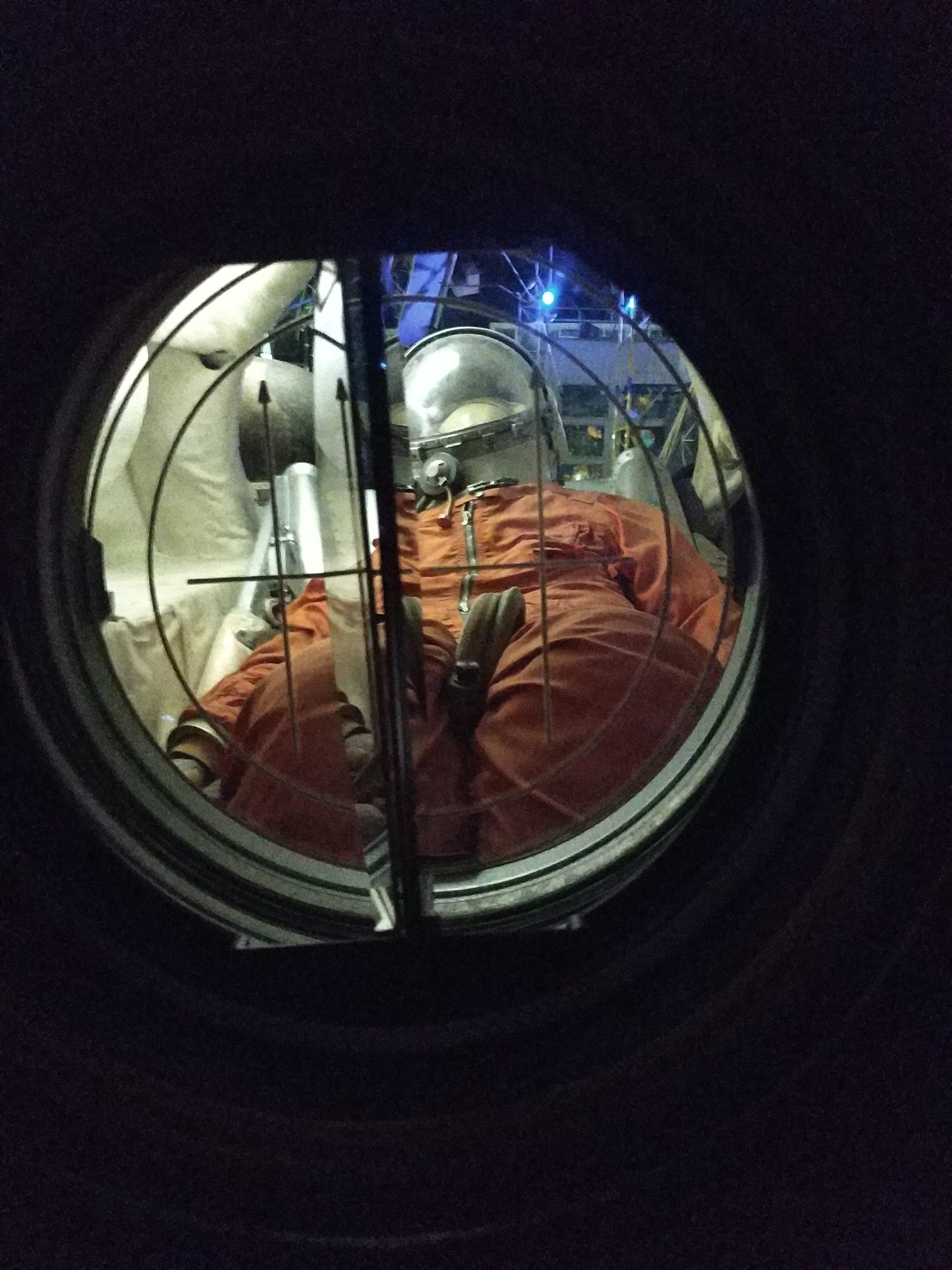

=== Space program ===
Engine of the first stage RD-214 (rocket R12 and Space Missile)

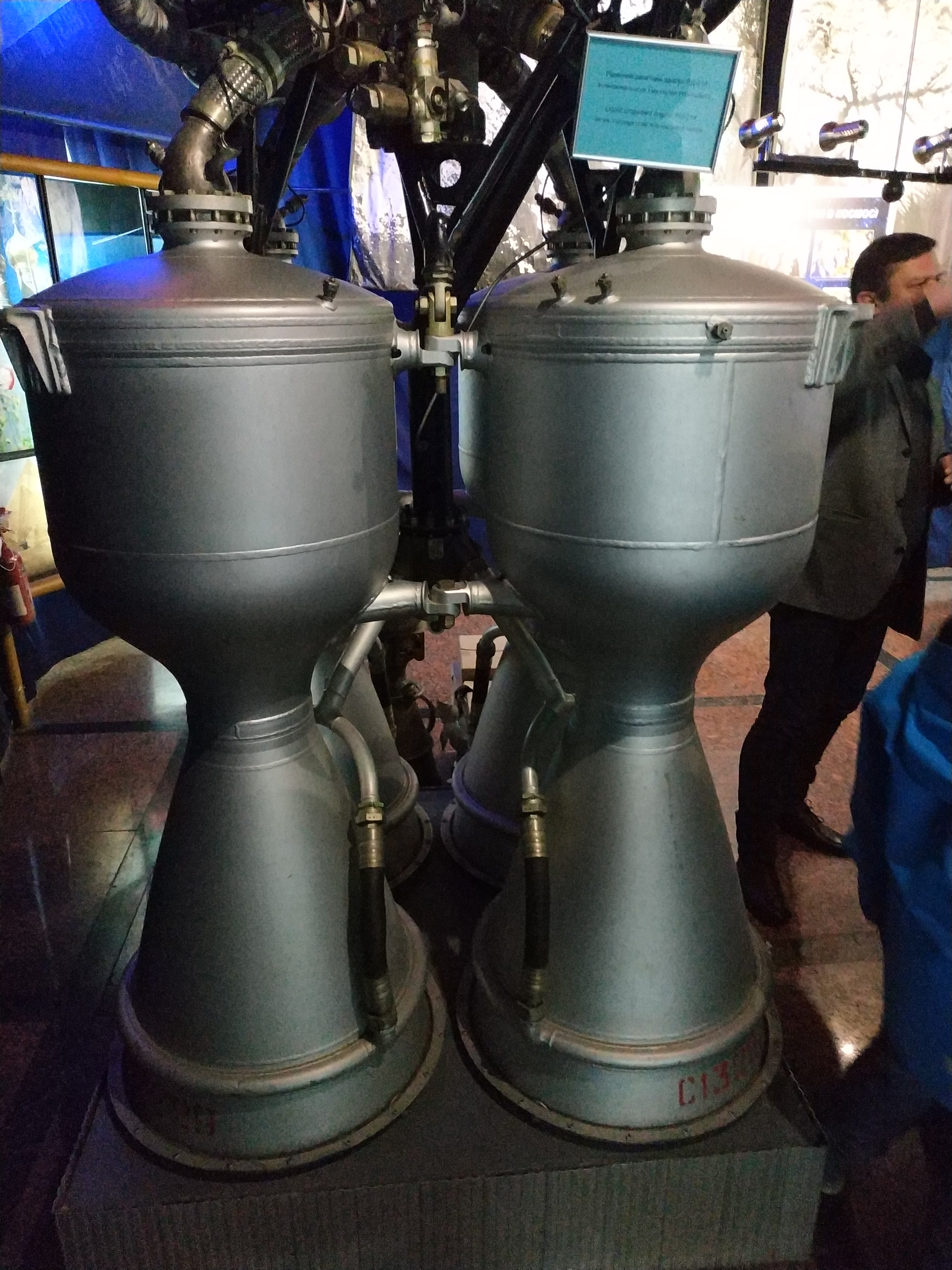

Engine of the second stage RD-119 (Space-2) Layout 1:10

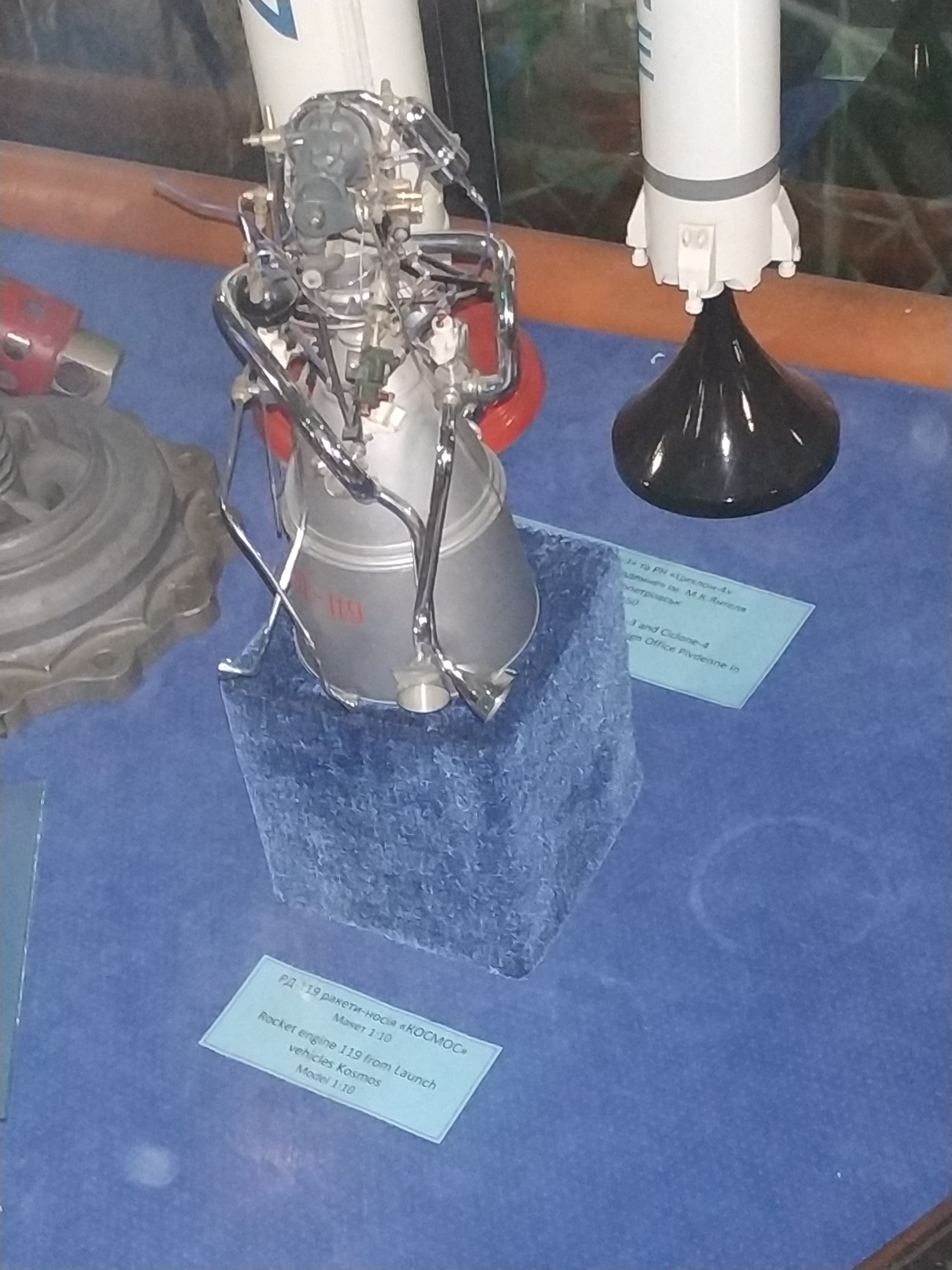

=== Descent Soyuz-27 (real) ===
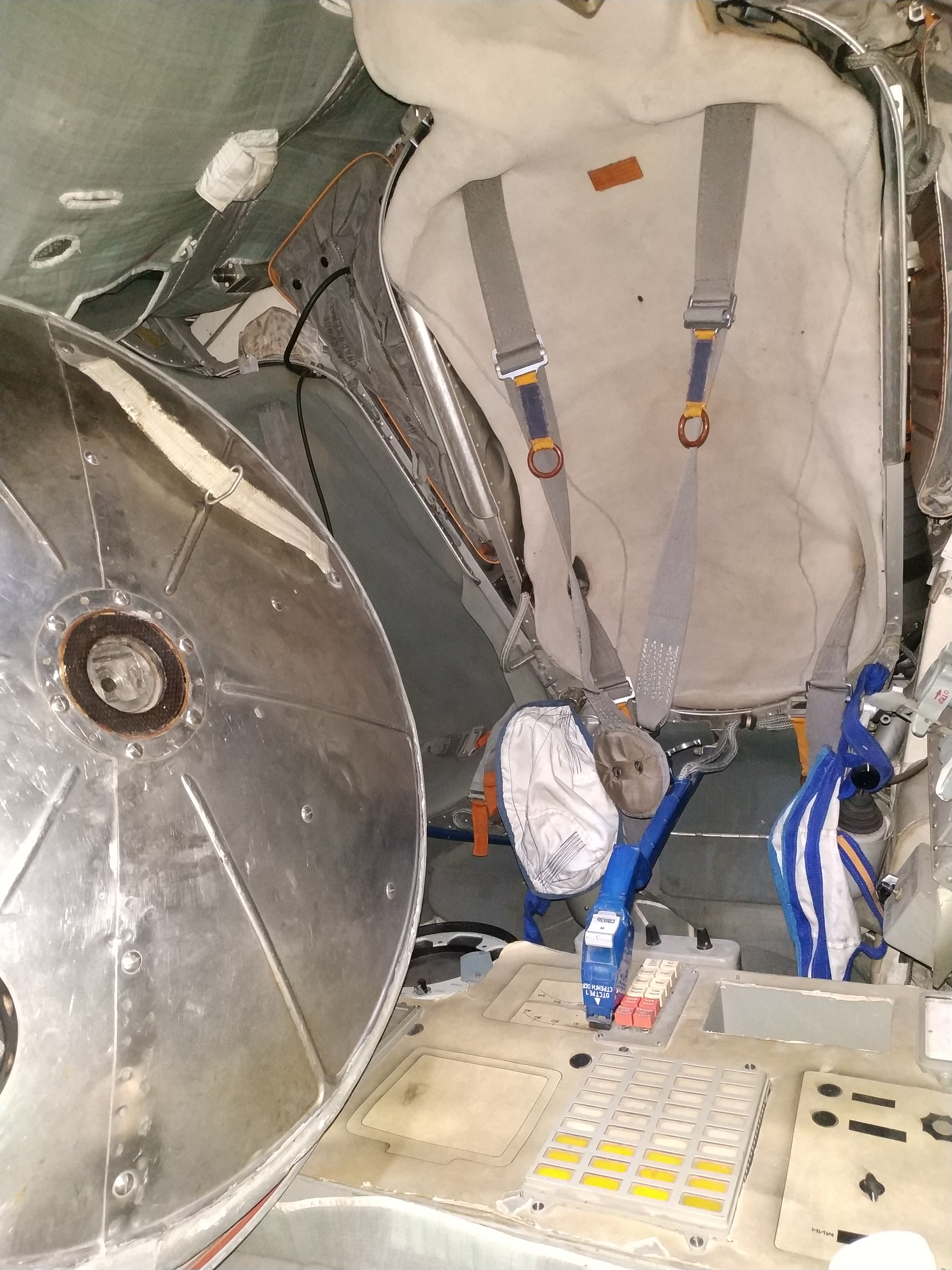

==== Couch from Soyuz-27 descend module ====
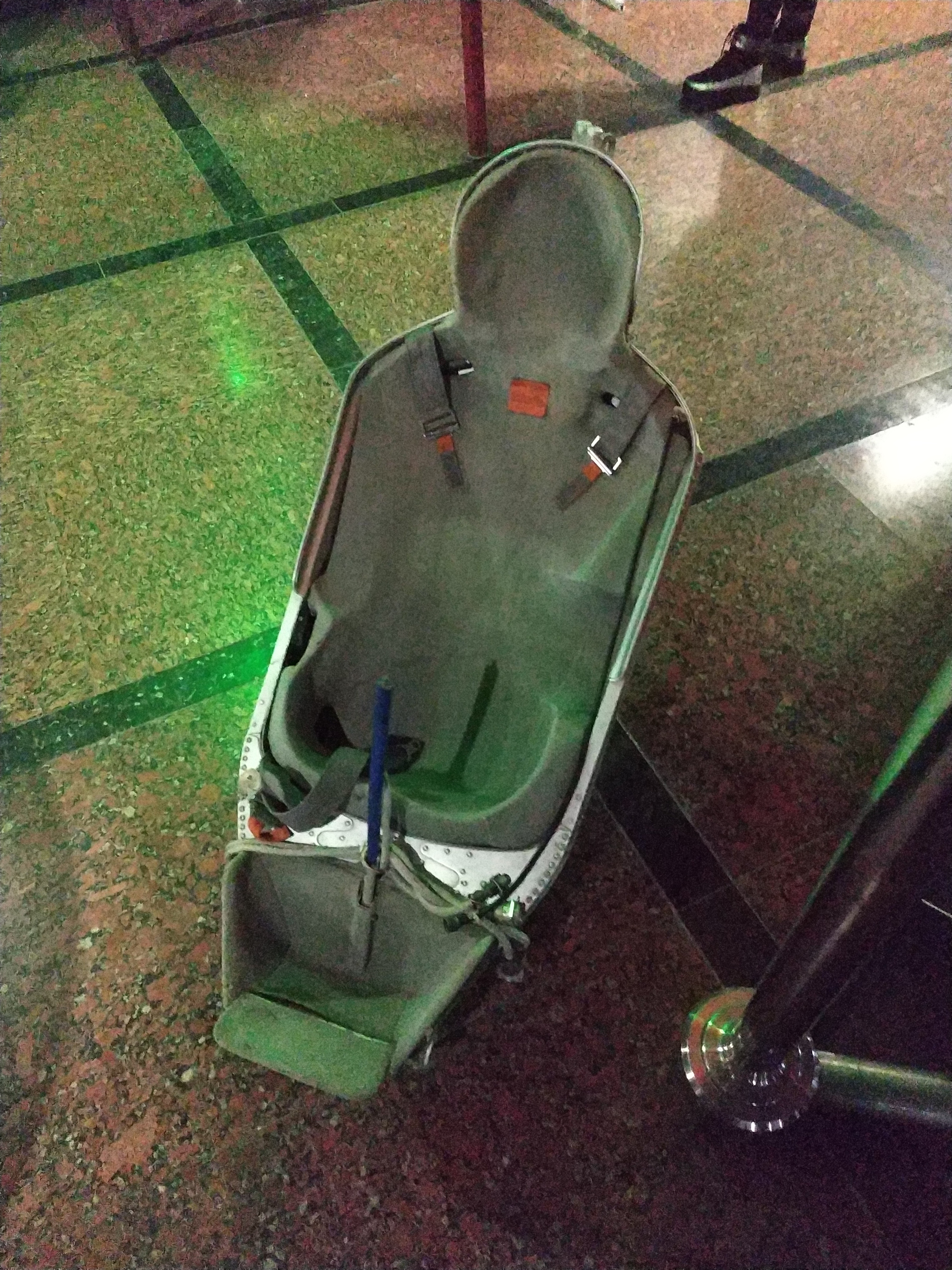

==== The Soyuz-27 launch key ====
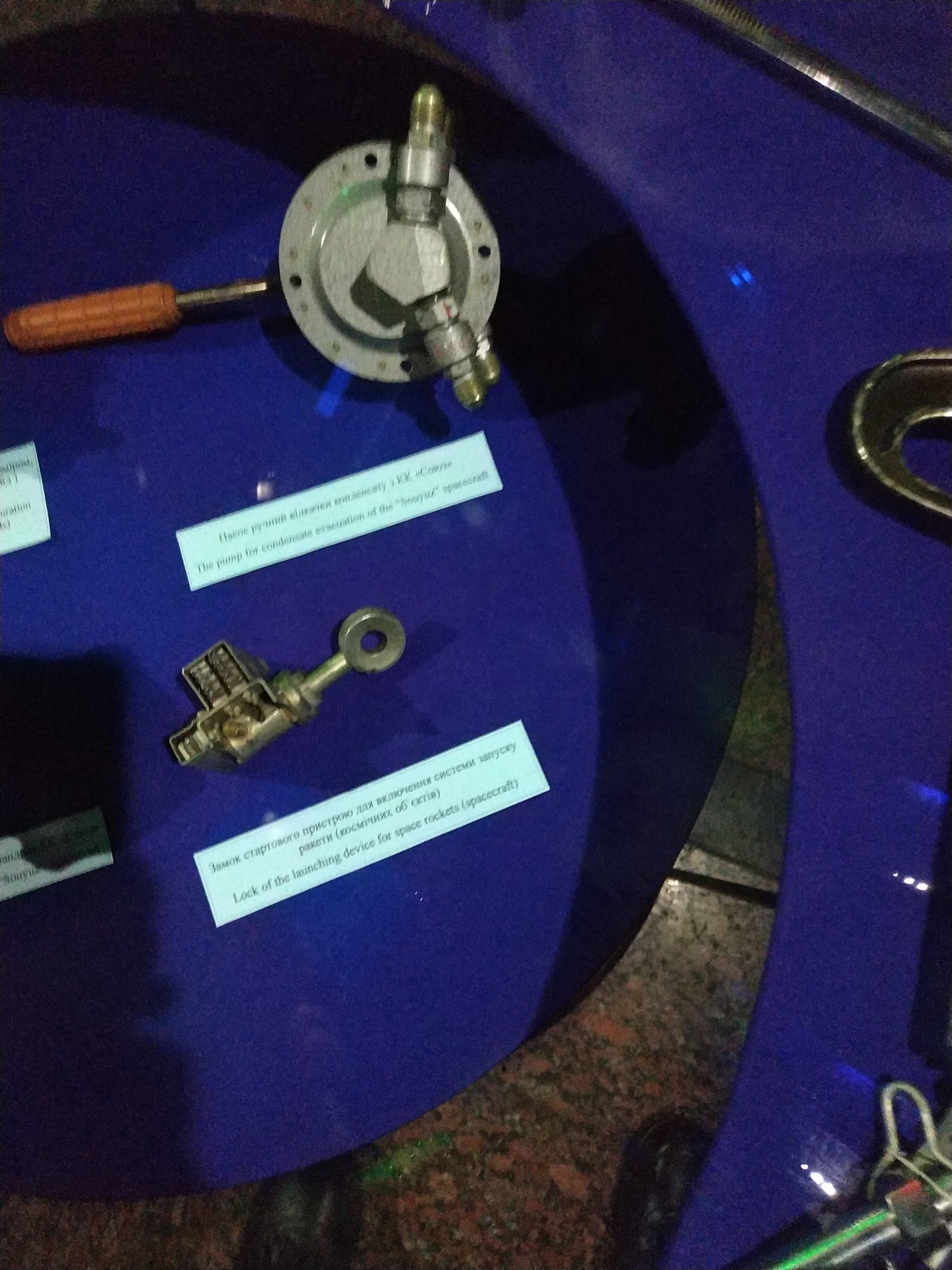

==== Dictaphone individual Soyuz-7 cosmonaut Dzhanibekova ====
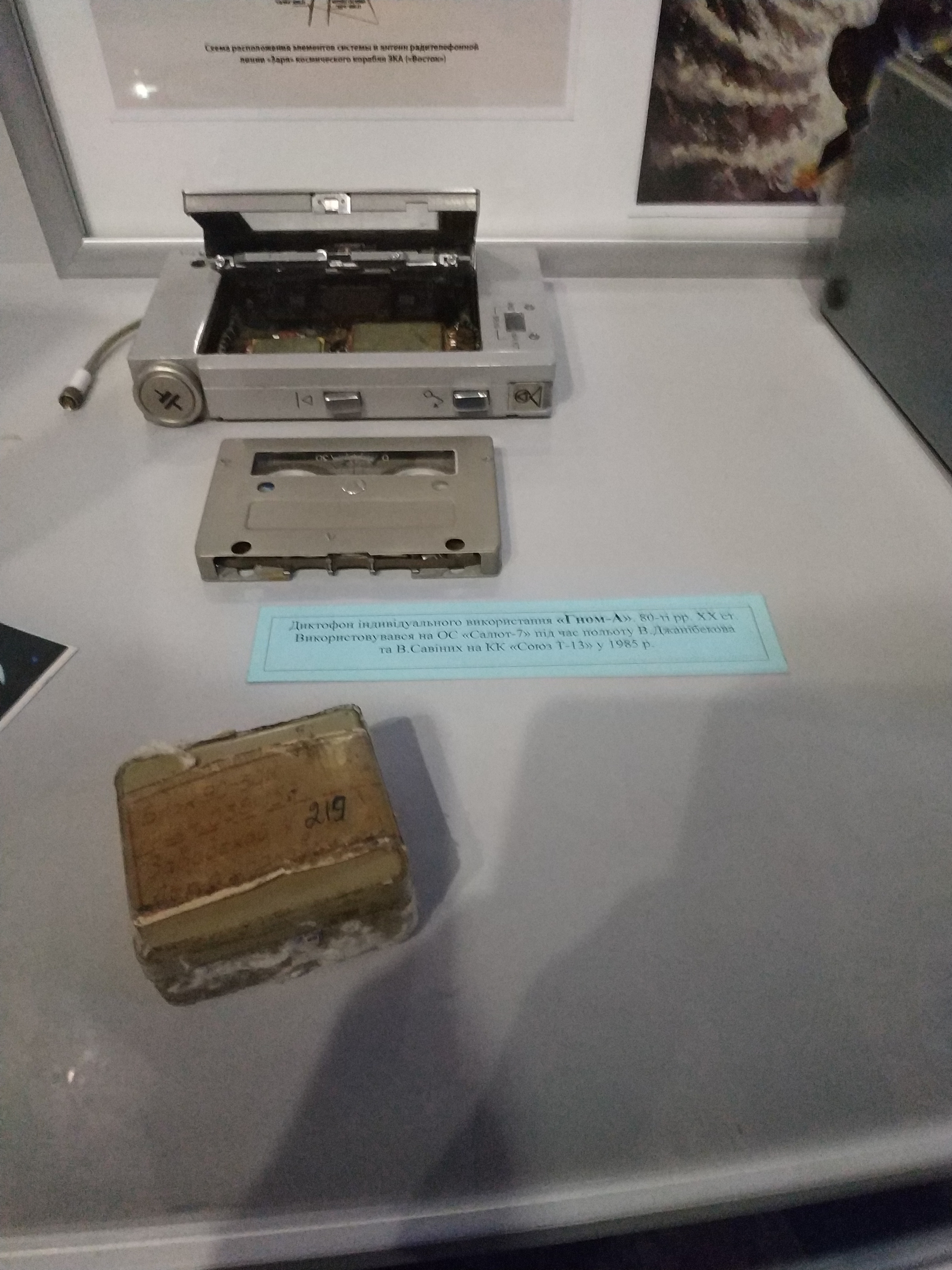

=== Communication systems Zarya ===
==== One of Zarya's connection modifications. ====
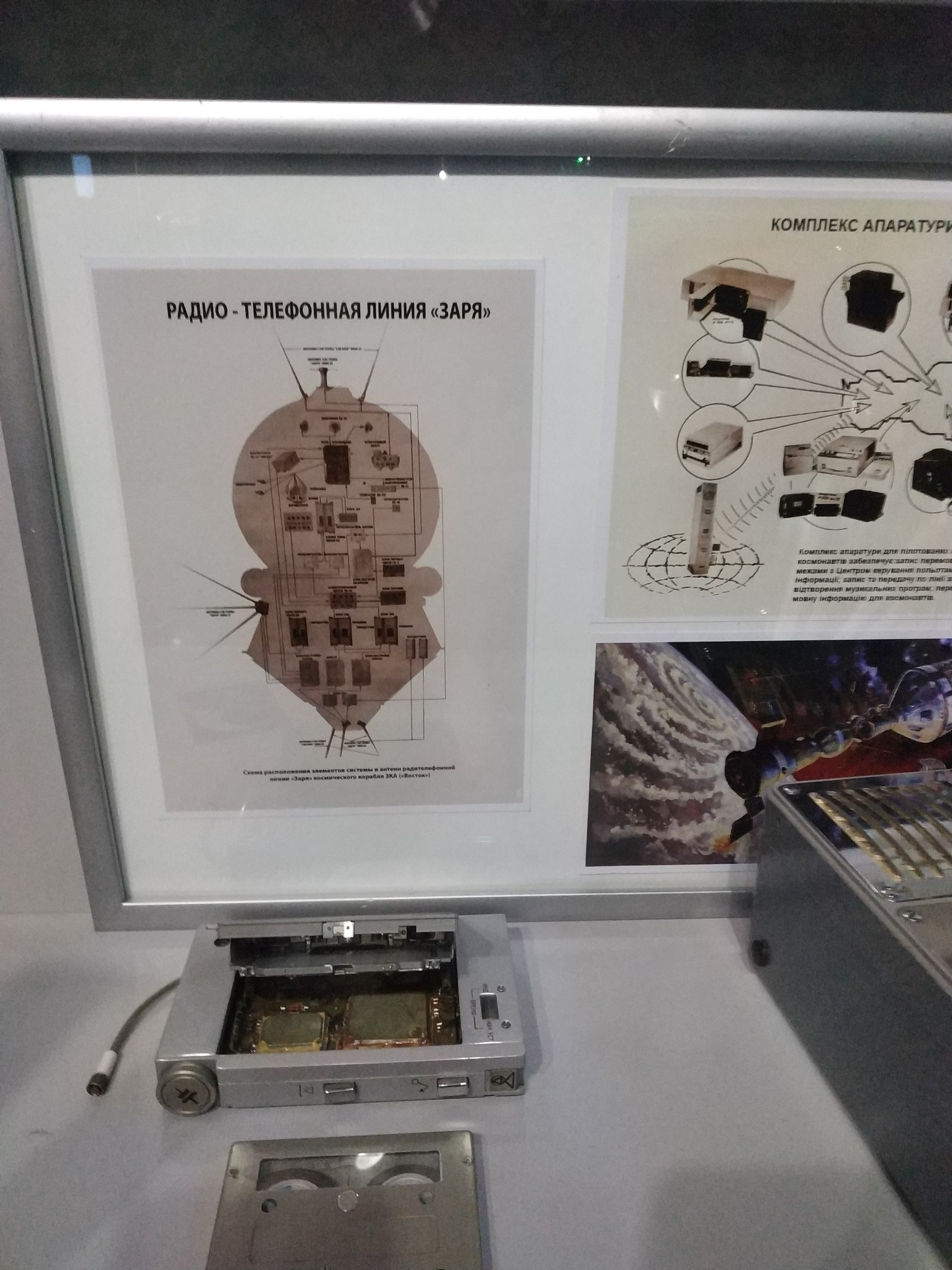

==== Recorder Zvezda-64 ====
The first space recording device that could suppress the noise of a spacecraft

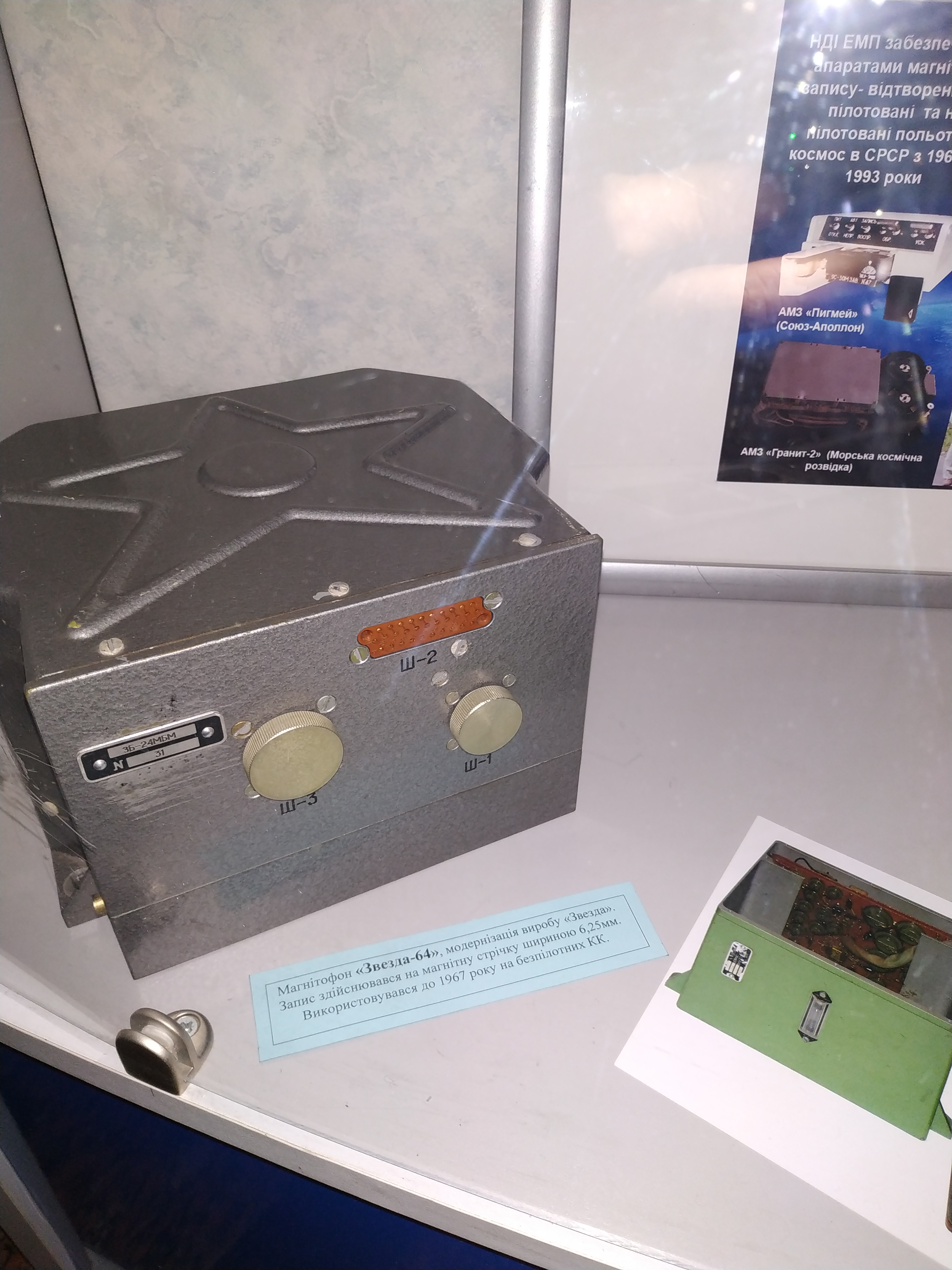

==== Recorder Pigmiy (Soyuz-Apollo program) ====
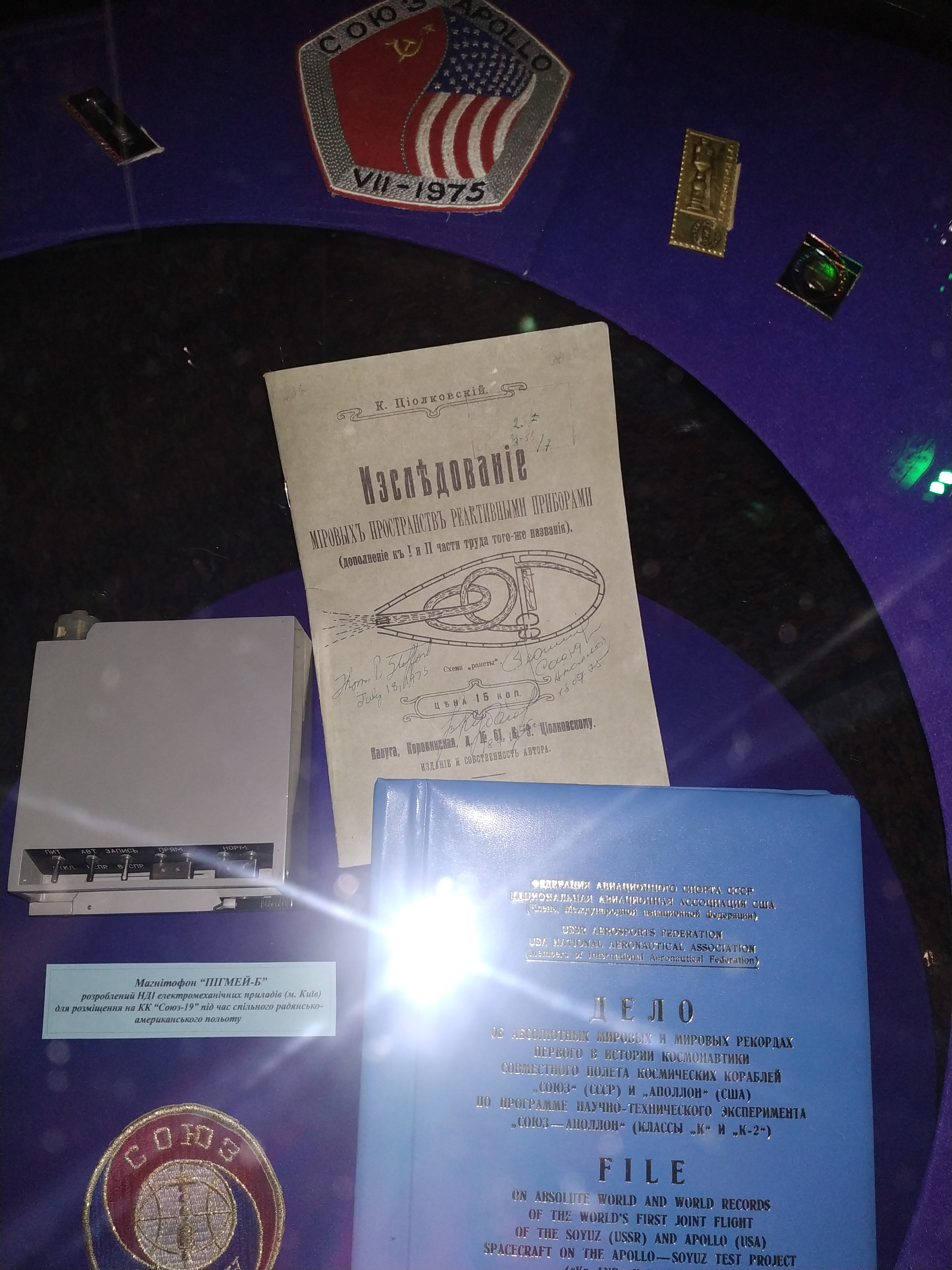

==== Recorder Planer-68 ====
Designer Dunaev

For work on the "Strela-1m" satellite. Recording 12 telegraph messages (length 10.5-12.5 s)

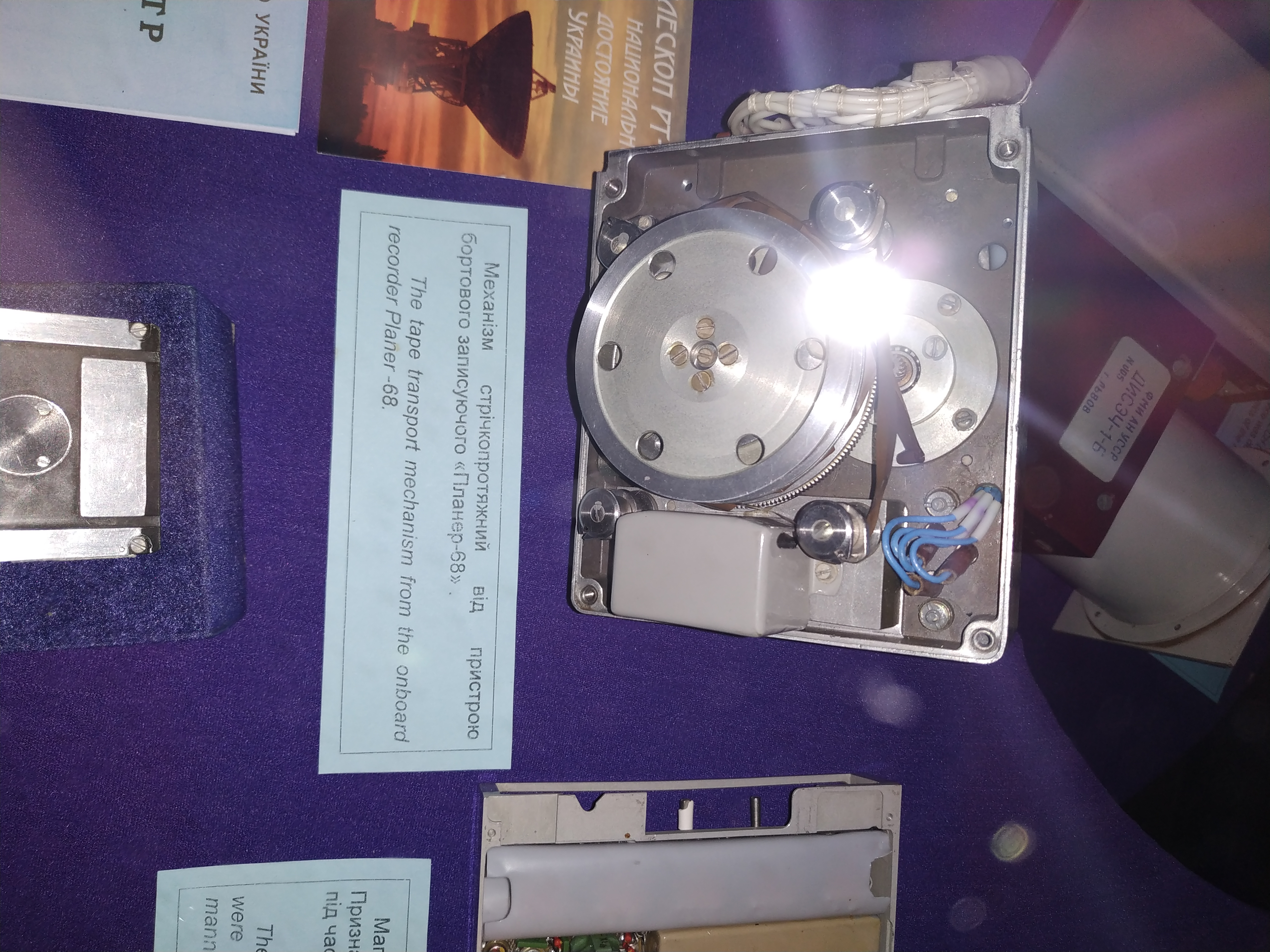

==== Recorder Tyulpan-M ====
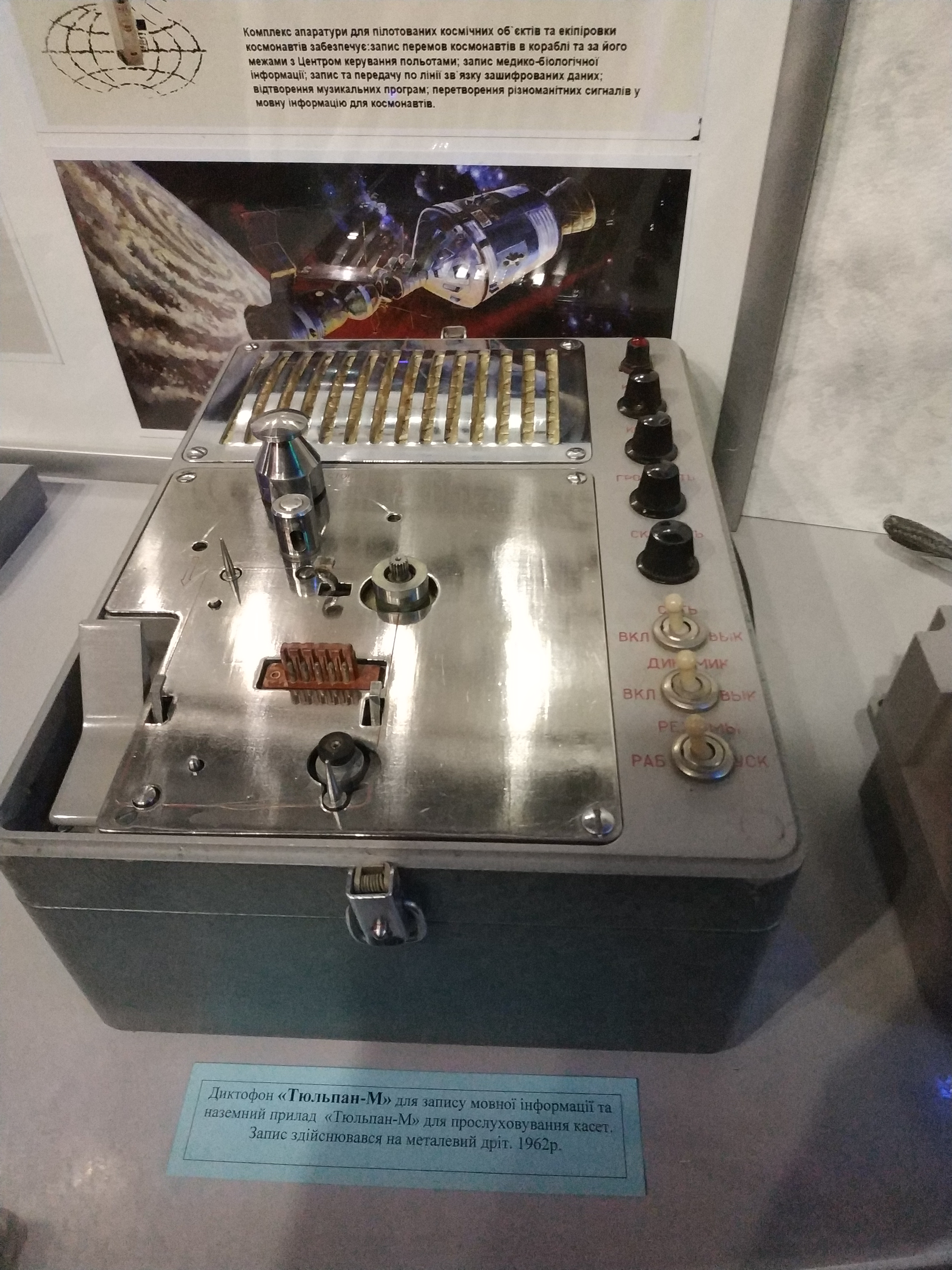
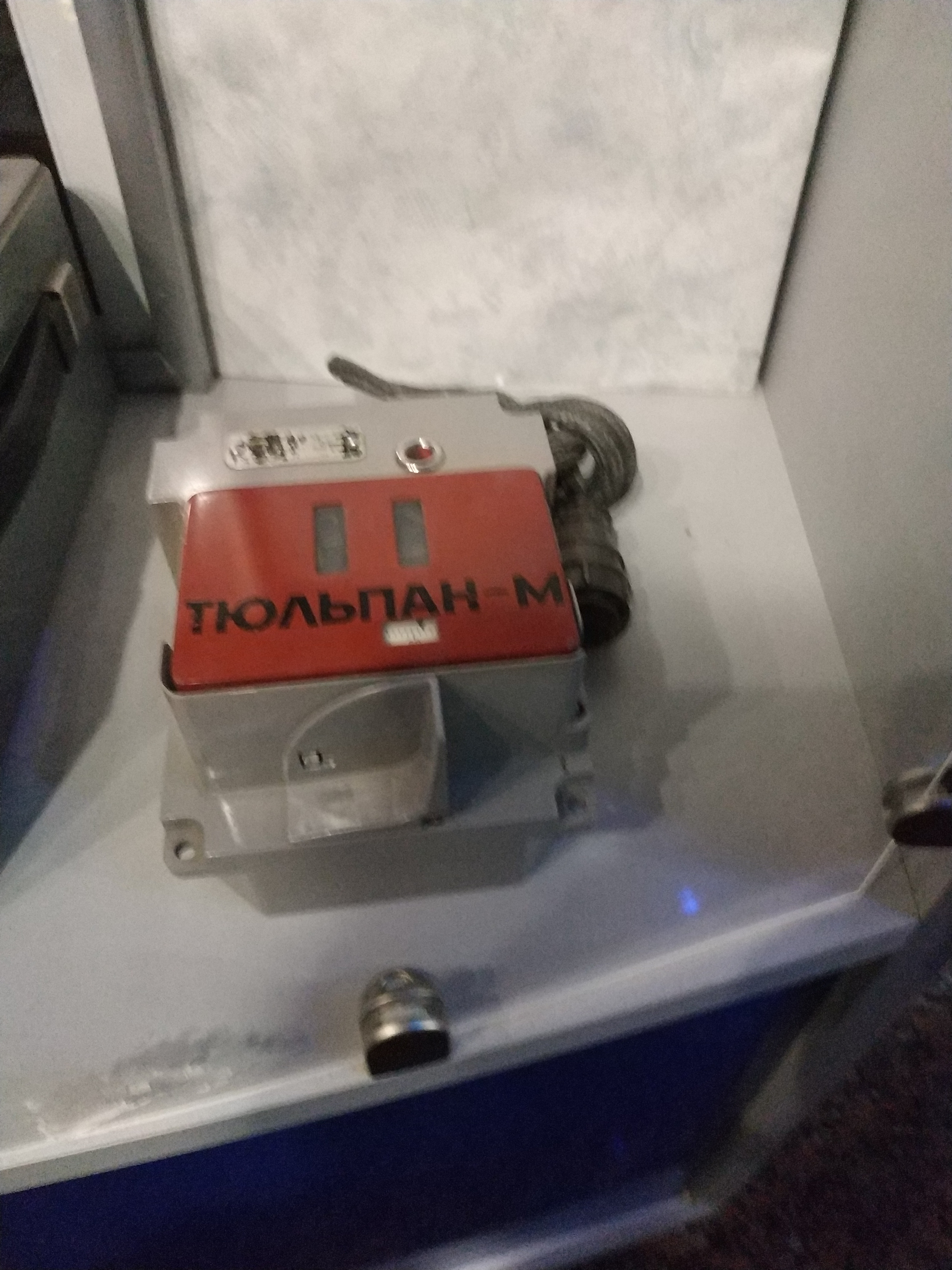

=== Astronauts' food ===
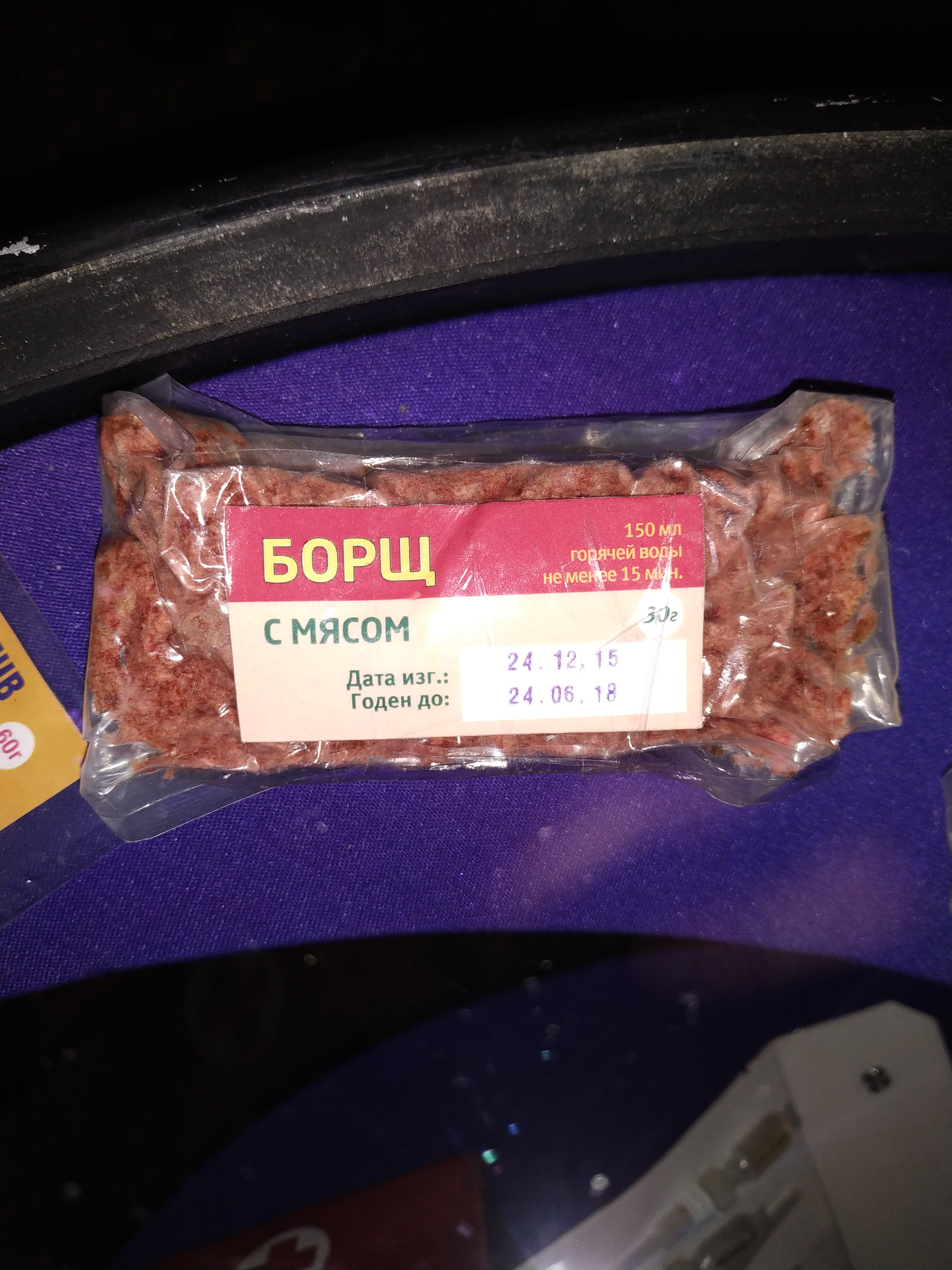
Borsch

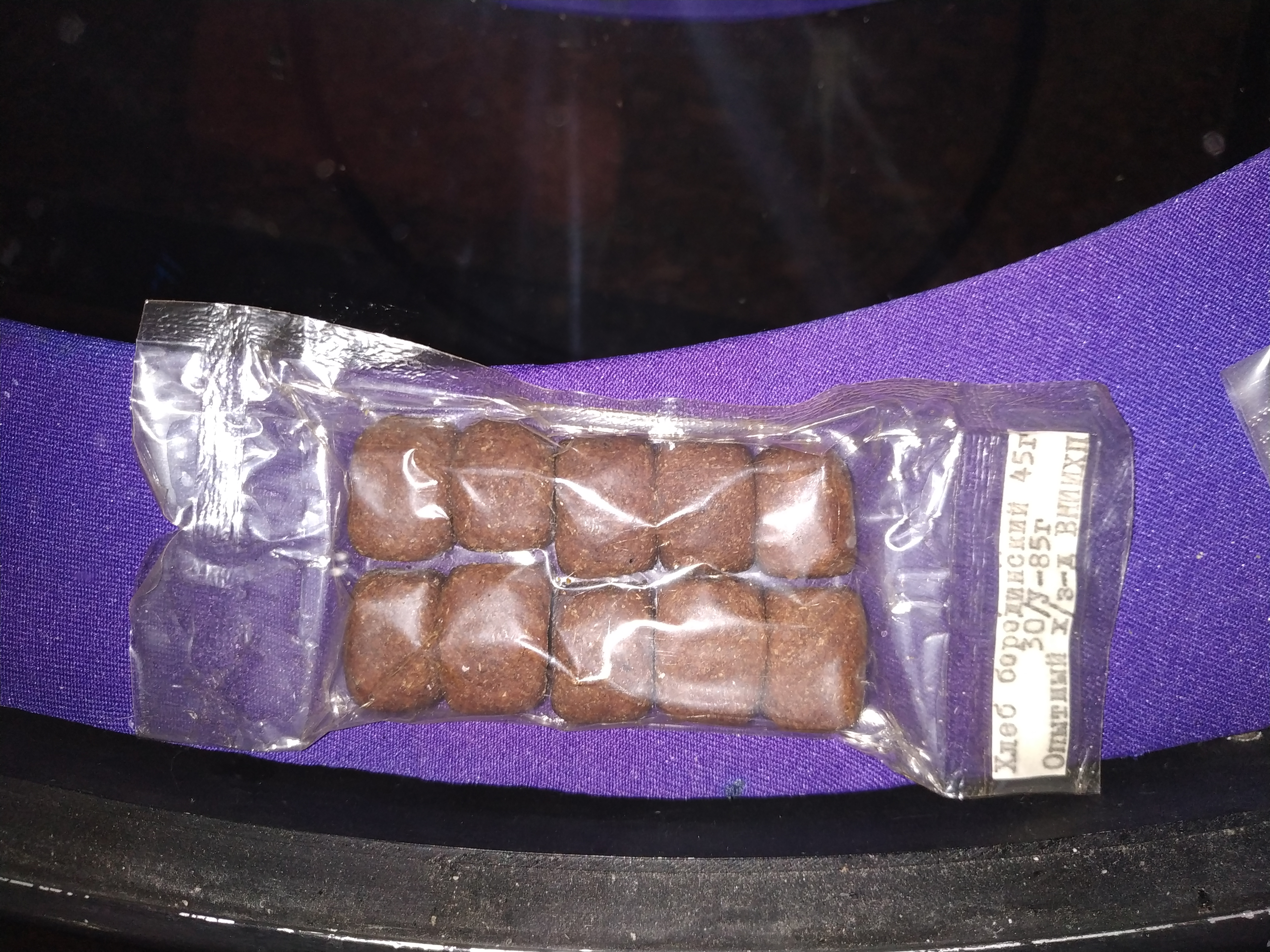
Borodinsky bread

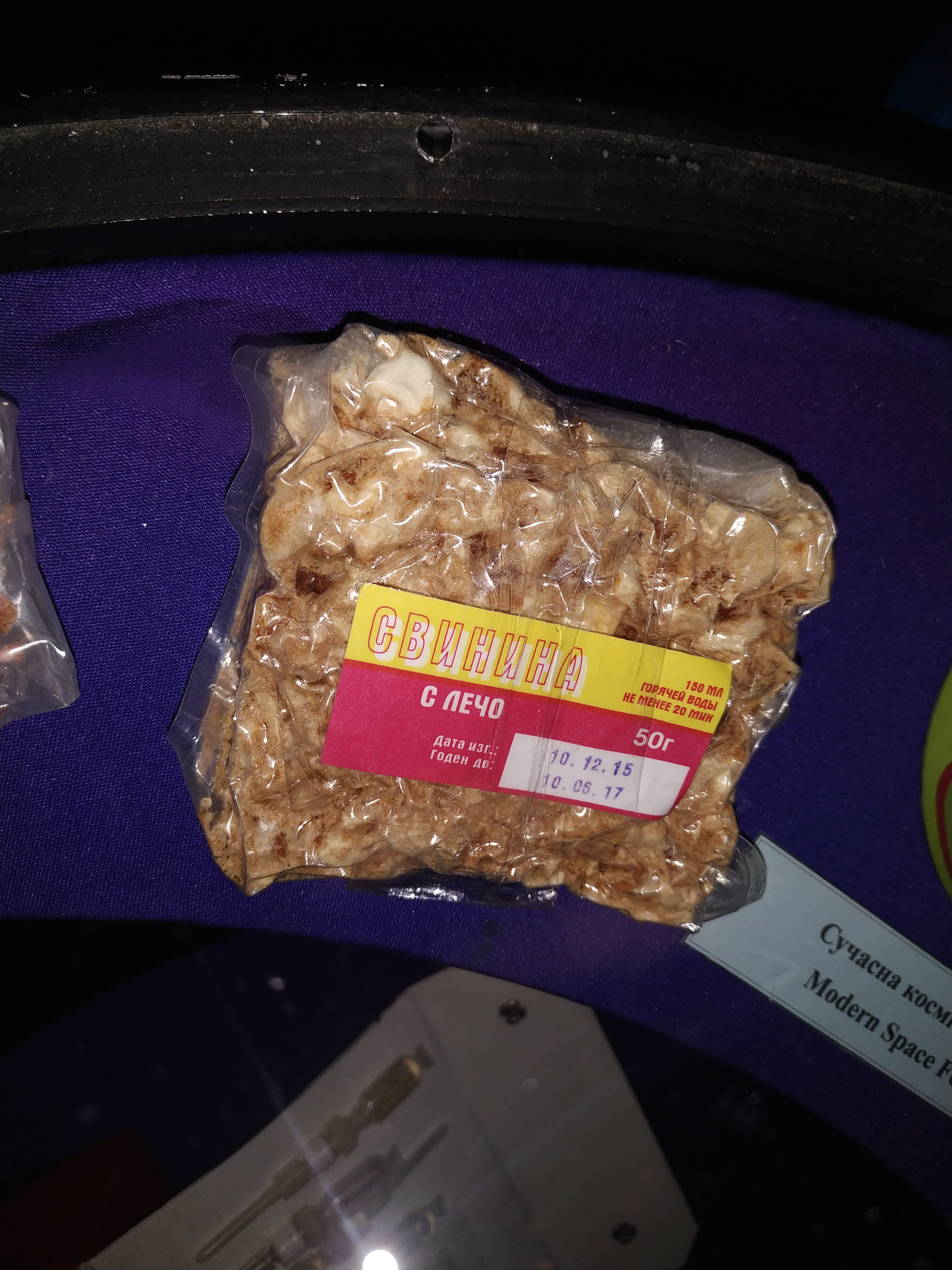
Pork with lecho

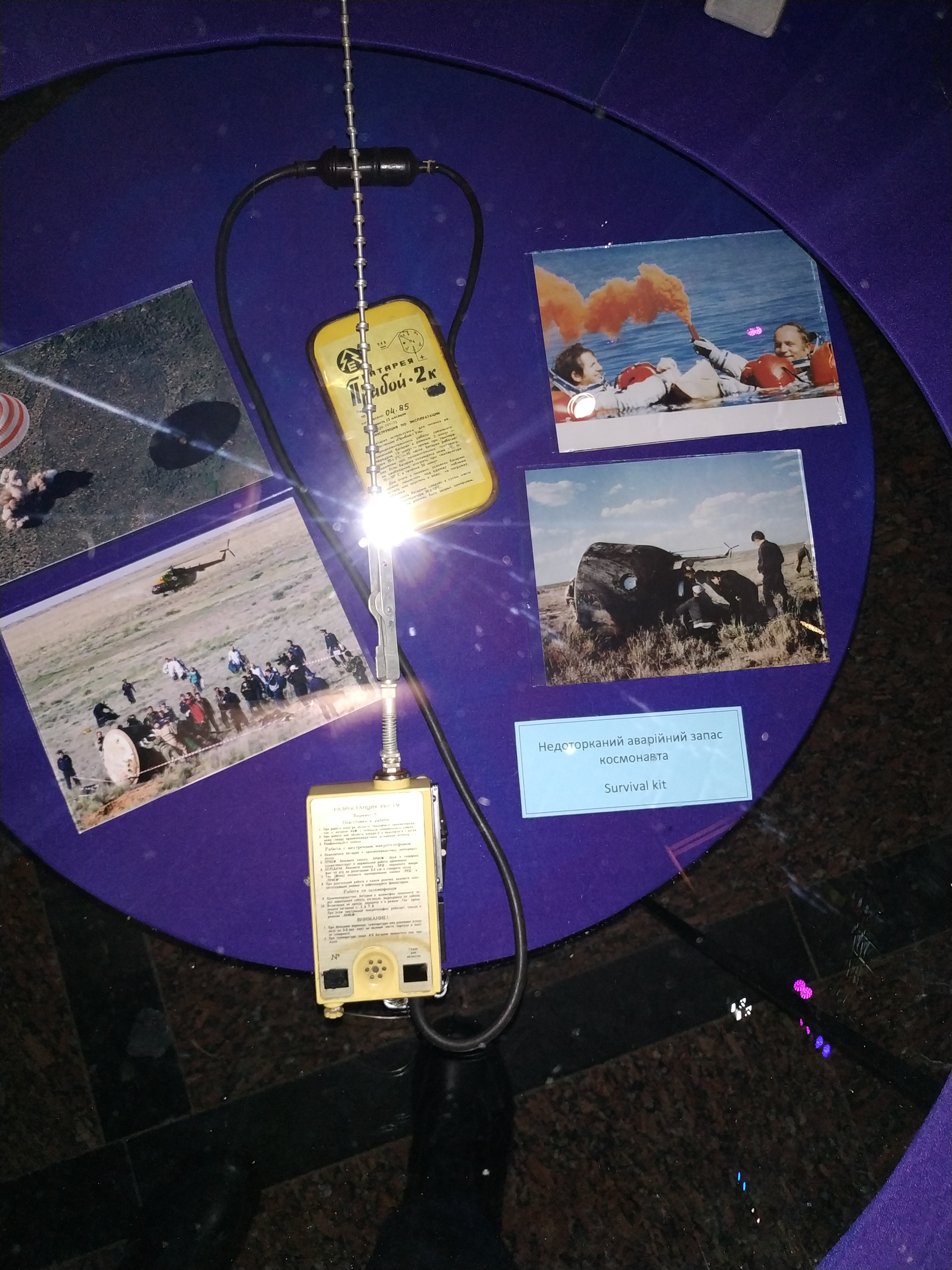
Emergency stock of a cosmonaut

=== Automatic control unit P-12 ===
There is a rocket control unit R-12. It was one of the most massive missiles in the territory of the Soviet Union, and the appearance of these missiles in Cuba caused the Caribbean crisis. It was the first rocket that was developed in the Dnieper.

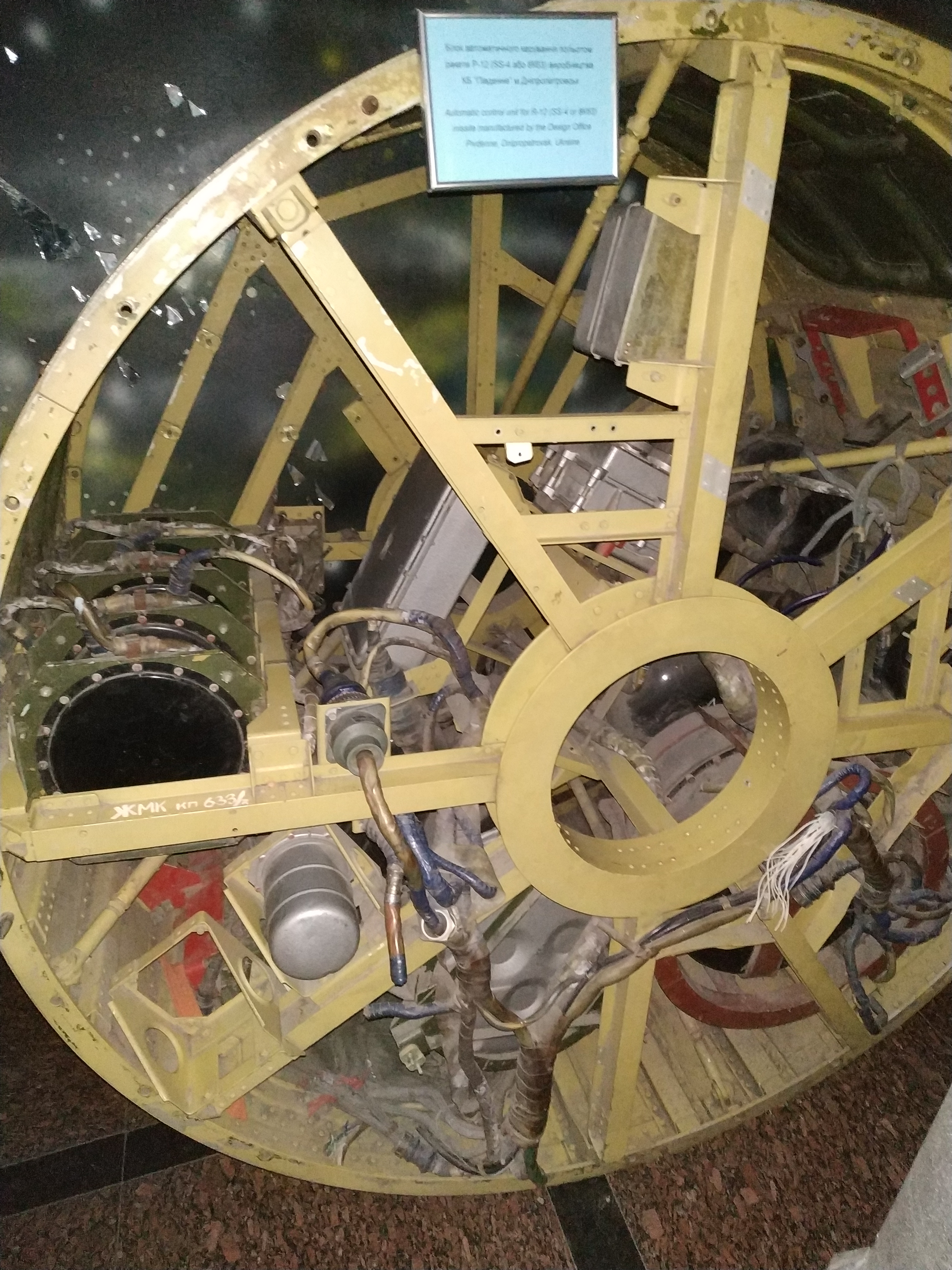

It was the first rocket that had automatic control.

=== International Space Studies Program ===
There is a layout of the Interkosmos-1 Intercosmos device

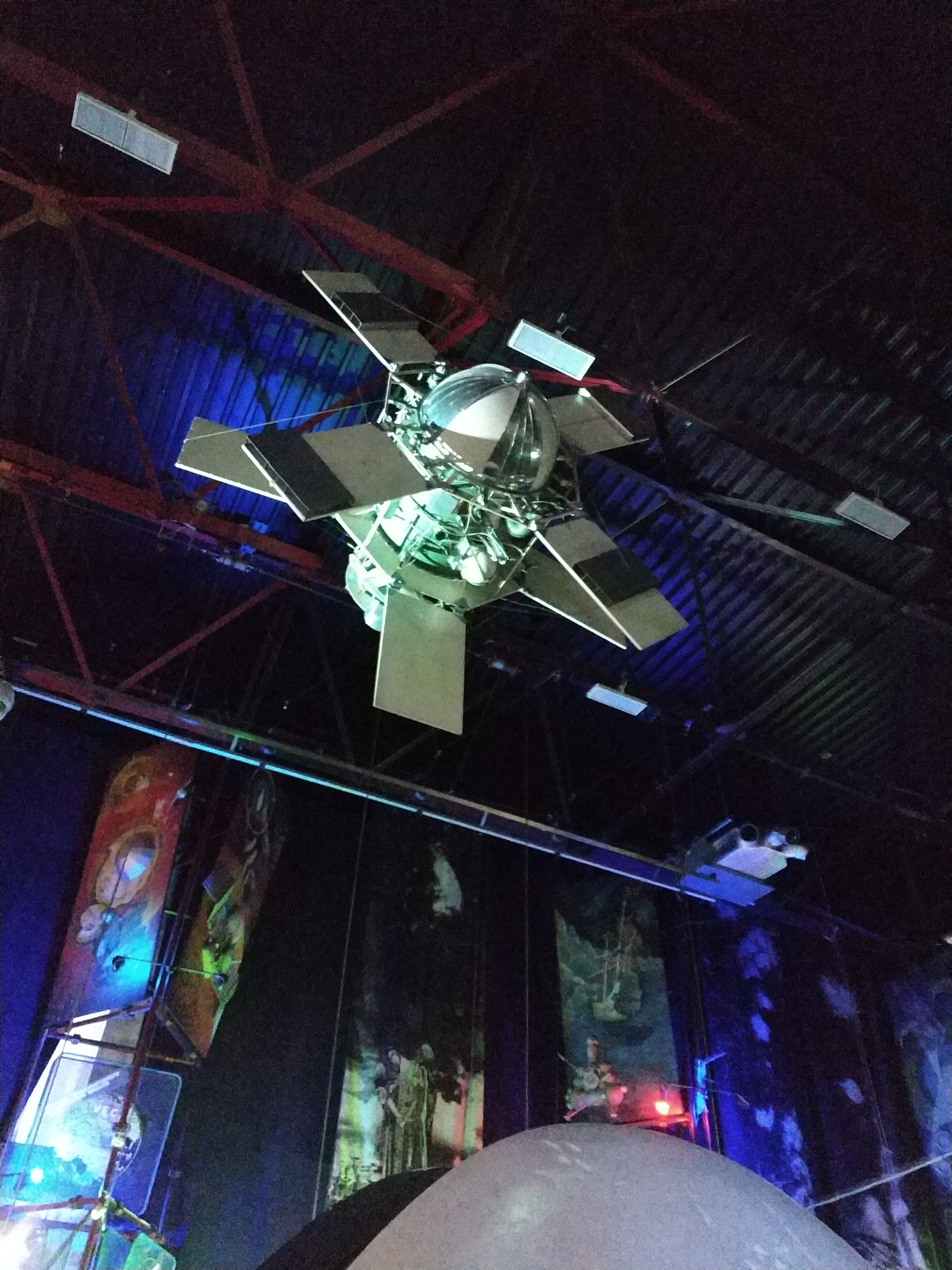

Spectrograph for photographing the sun

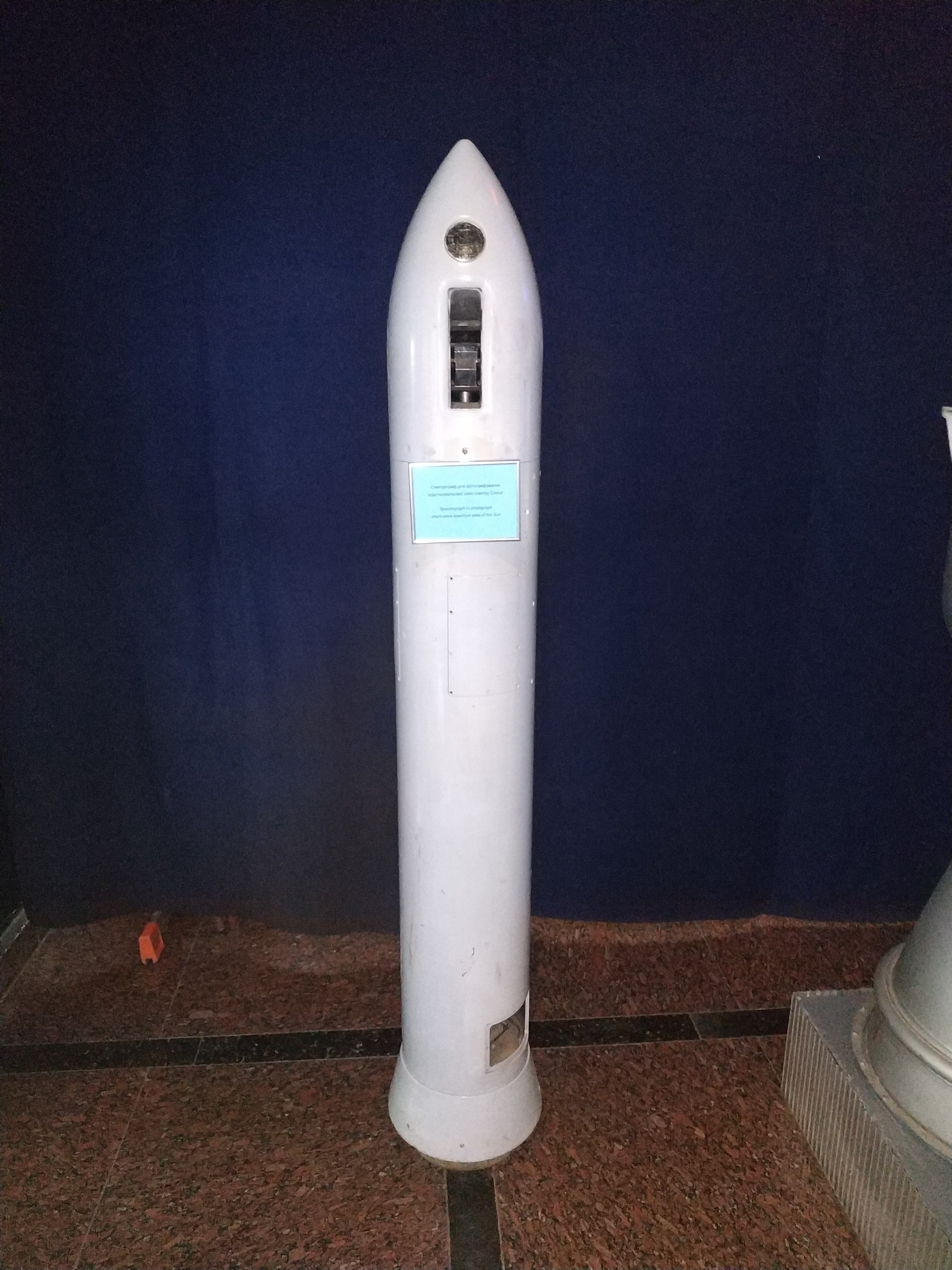

Oreol 3 (Aureus 3, AUOS-Z-M-A-IK, ARCAD 3), the Oreol-3 1981 (designed to study the nature of the polar light)

systems with power of signals that differ by 10-12 orders. The difficult task of isolating obstacles was solved

12 experiments (4 from the Soviet Union, 7 from France, 1 compatible)

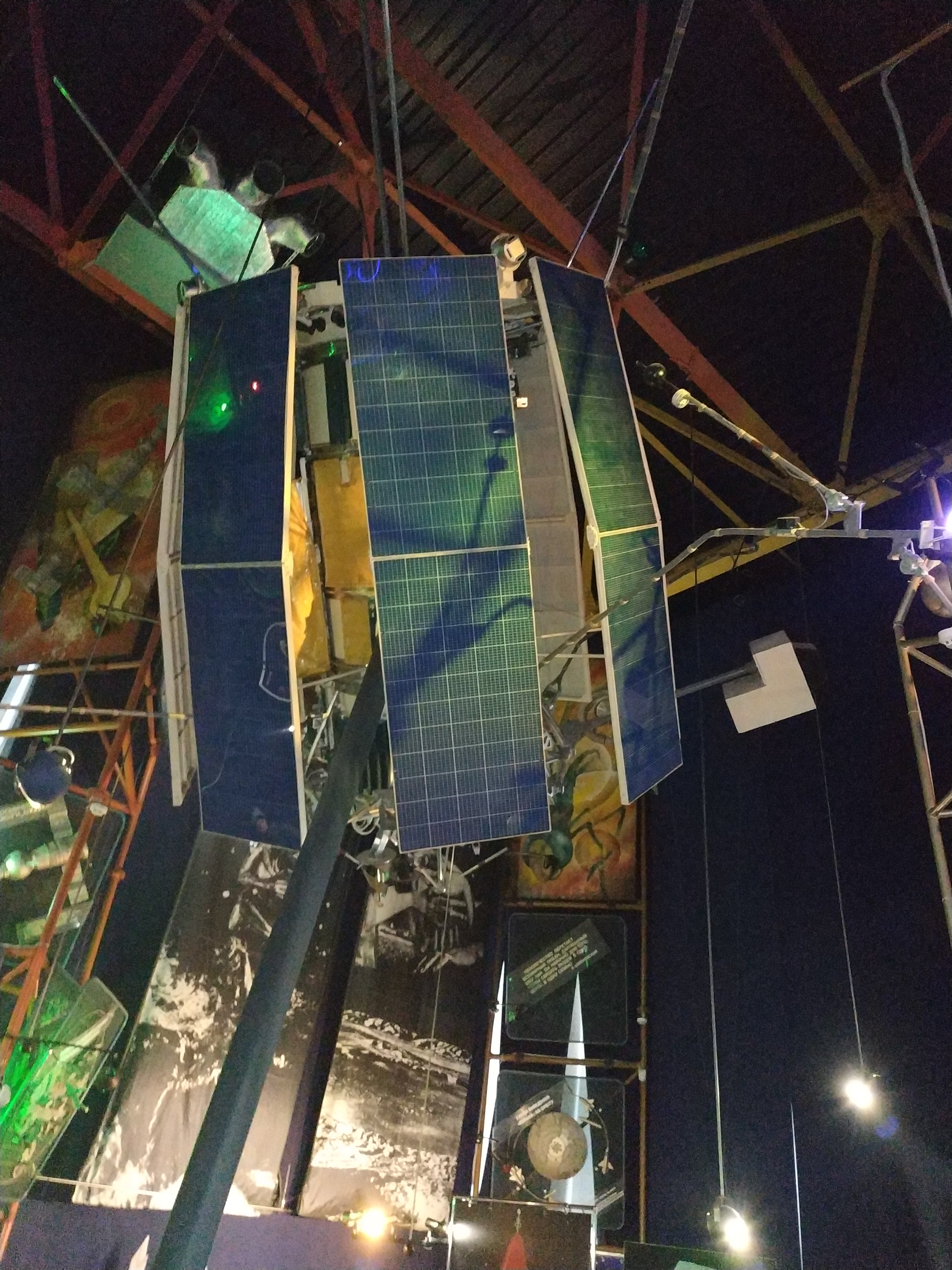

=== Marine launch ===
Layout of missiles Zenit-2 and Zenith-3SL Scale 1: 100

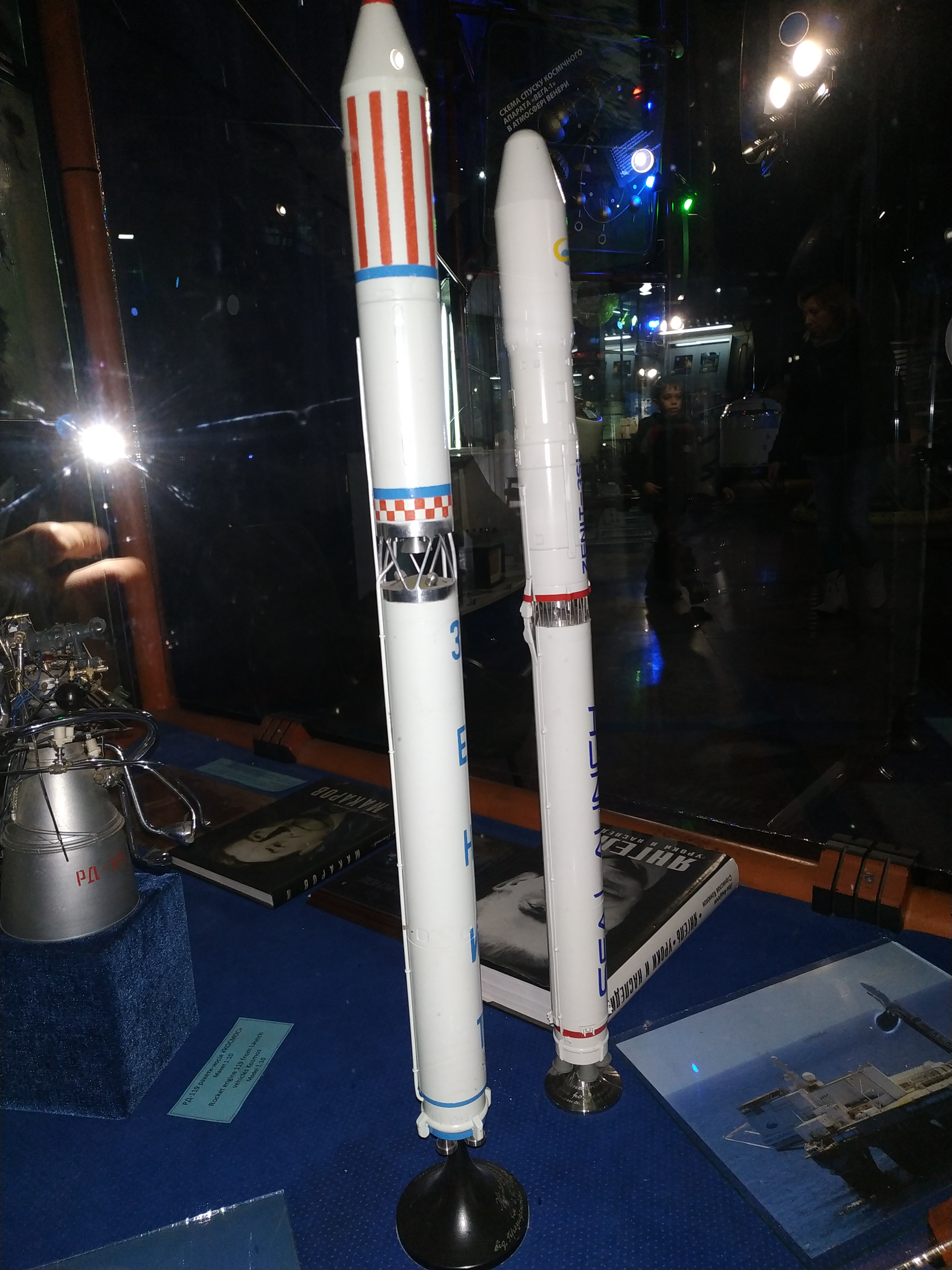

=== Leonid Kadenyuk ===
Personal Cosmonaut Leonid Kadenukz mission NASA STS-87

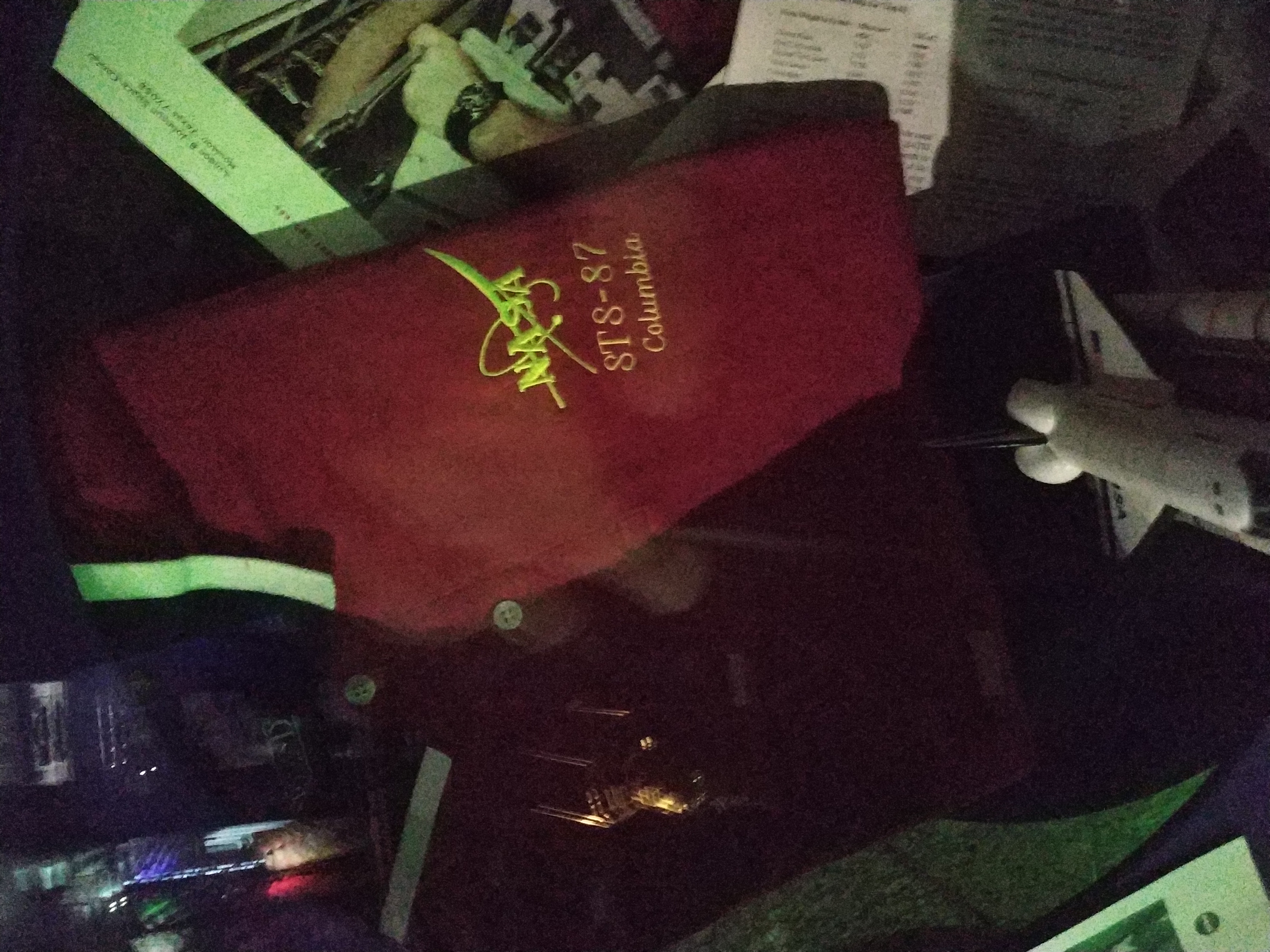

== See also ==
- Sergei Korolev
