= List of museums in Ukraine =

This is a list of museums in Ukraine. Many of these museums are at risk in 2022 due to the Russian invasion of Ukraine. To minimize confusion and inadvertent duplication, alternative translations of museum names are given in parentheses following the primary identification, with street addresses as available.

This list contains details of museums within Crimea, which was annexed by Russia in 2014, and is now administered as part of the Russian Federation.

== Cherkasy Oblast ==
- Cherkasy
  - Cherkasy Archaeological Museum of the Middle Dnipro region – 21 Smilyanska St, Cherkasy
  - Korsun-Shevchenkiv State Historical and Cultural Reserve – Kotsyubynskoho Island Street, 4, Korsun'-Shevchenkivskyi, Cherkasy
  - Cherkasy Regional Museum of Local Lore (Cherkasy Museum of Local History) – 1 Slavy St, Cherkasy
  - Vasyl Symonenko Museum (Literary Memorial Museum) – 251 Khreshchatyk St, Cherkasy
  - Cherkasy Regional Art Museum – 259 Khreshchatyk St, Cherkasy
  - Kobzar Museum (Museum of the Kobzar written by Taras Shevchenko, Tsybulsky House) – 37 Baidy Vyshnevetskoho St, Cherkasy
- Chyhyryn
  - Chyhyryn National Historical and Cultural Reserve – 26 Hrushevskoho St. Includes:
    1. Bohdan Khmelnytsky Museum (Bohdan Khmelnytsky Residence) – 26 Hrushevskoho St, Chyhyryn
    2. Three Wells – Subotiv
    3. Subotiv History Museum – 10 Zhovtneva St, Subotiv
      - 19th c. Ukrainian House Museum
- Kaniv
  - Taras Hill – Kaniv
- Stetsivka
  - Cossack Village, (Kozatsʹkyy Khutir) – Stetsivka
- Uman
  - Uman Lore Museum – 31 Zhovtneva Street, Uman
- Moshny
  - Museum of Taras Shevchenko – Kirova St, Moshny

== Chernihiv Oblast ==
- Chernihiv
  - Chernihiv Regional Art Museum – 6 Muzeina St, Chernihiv
  - Chernihiv Military History Museum – 55A Shevchenka St, Chernihiv
  - Museum of Ukrainian Antiquities - Shevchenko Street 55 A, Chernihiv
  - Chernihiv Literary Memorial Museum-Reserve of M. M. Kotsiubynsky – 3 Kotsyubynskoho St, Chernihiv
  - Leskovitsa History Museum - Tolstoy Street, 23 Chernihiv
  - Museum of Aviation and Cosmonautics - Streletska Street 4, 23 Chernihiv
- Baturyn
  - Historic and Cultural Reserve - Museum of Hetmancy – 18 Partyzanska St, Baturyn. Oversees:
  1. Baturyn Museum of Archeology – 10 Partyzanska St, Baturyn
  2. Baturyn House of Culture – Partyzanska St, Baturyn
  3. Kochubey House (Judge General Vasyl Kochubey House) – Hetmanska St, Baturyn
- Sosnytsya
  - Literary and Memorial Museum of Aleksander P. Dovzhenka – 2 2th Dovzhenka Ln, Sosnytsya

== Chernivtsi Oblast ==
- Chernivtsi
  - Bukovynian Diaspora Museum – Yosypa Hlavky St, Chernivtsi
  - Yuriy Fedkovich Literary Memorial Museum – 10 Soborna Square, Chernivtsi
  - Volodymyr Ivasyuk Memorial Museum – 40/1 Mayakovsky St., Chernivtsi
  - Museum of Jewish history of Bukovina – 5 Teatralna Square, Chernivtsi
  - Olga Kobylyanska Literary Memorial Museum – 5 Okunevska St., Chernivtsi
  - Chernivtsi Literary Memorial Museum of Yury Fedkovich – 1B Geroyiv Maydanu St, Chernivtsi
  - Chernivtsi Regional Art Museum – 10 Tsentralna Square, Chernivtsi
  - Chernivtsi Regional Museum of Folk Architecture and Life – S38B Sichovykh Strilʹtsiv, Chernivtsi
  - Chernivtsi Regional Museum of Local Lore (Chernivtsi Regional Museum) – 28 Kobylyanskoi St, Chernivtsi
  - Chernivtsi Regional Memorial Museum of Volodymyr Ivasyuk – 40/1 Mayakovs'koho St, Chernivtsi
  - Museum of Aviation and Cosmonautics – 220 Holovna St, Chernivtsi
  - Chernivtsi Museum of Military History of the Region – 2B Aksenina St, Chernivtsi
- Kosiv
  - Museum Kornelyuk (Ceramics Museum) – T2518, Kosiv
- Chortoryya
  - Ivan Mykolaichuk Manor Museum – Т2601, Chortoryya
- Zeleniv
  - Carpathian Nature Museum – Т2601, Zeleniv

== Crimea ==
- Alupka
  - Vorontsov Palace – 18 Dvortsove Hwy, Alupka
- Balaklava
  - Naval museum complex Balaklava
- Feodosia
  - Aivazovsky National Art Gallery – 2 Gallery St., Feodosia
  - Feodosia Museum of Antiquities – 11 Aivazovskoho Ave, Feodosia
  - Museum of Marina and Anastasia Tsvetaeva – 13 Korobkova Blvd, Feodosia
  - Feodosia Money Museum – 12 Kuybysheva St, Feodosia
  - Museum of Vera Mukhina – 1 Fedka St, Feodosia
- Livadiya
  - Livadia Palace – 44A Baturyna St, Livadiya
- Simferopol
  - Larisa Borisovna Museum of the History of the City of Simferopol – 17 Pushkina St, Simferopol
  - Simferopol Art Museum – 35 Karla Libknekhta St,.Simferopol
- Sevastopol
  - Mikhail Kroshitsky Sevastopol Art Museum – 9 Nakhimova Ave, Sevastopol
- Yalta
  - White Dacha (A.P. House-Museum Chekhov) – 112 Kirova St, Yalta

== Dnipropetrovsk Oblast ==
- Dnipro
  - Dnipropetrovsk Art Museum – 21 Shevchenka St, Dnipro
  - House-Museum of Dmytro Yavornytsky – 5 Taras Shevchenko St, Dnipro
  - Museum of Ukrainian Painting – 5A Troitska Square, Dnipro
  - Dmytro Yavornytsky National Historical Museum of Dnipro – 16 Dmytra Yavornytskoho Ave, Dnipro
- Kryvyi Rih
  - Mining Machines Museum – Marshaka St, Kryvyi Rih
  - Michael Marmer Museum Center of Jewish Culture and History of the Shoah – 46 Pushkina St, Kryvyi Rih
  - Kryvyi Rih Historical and Local History Museum – 16A Kaunaska St, Kryvyi Rih

== Donetsk Oblast ==
- Donetsk
  - Donetsk Regional Museum of Local Lore (Donetsk Museum of Local History) – 189B Chelyuskintsiv St, Donetsk
- Druzhkivka
  - Druzhkovka Art Museum – 112 Enhelsa St, 112, Druzhkivka
- Horlivka
  - Horlivka Art Museum – 23 Pushkinska St, Horlivka
  - Horlivka Museum of Miniature Books – 57 Peremohy Ave, Horlivkaorsk
- Kramatorsk
  - Kramatorsk Art Museum – 60 Akademichna St, Kramatorsk
- Makiivka
  - Makyvsky Museum of Local Lore (Makyvsky Museum of Local History) – 51/26 Lenina Ave, Makiivka
- Mariupol
  - Arkhip Kuindzhi Art Museum (Kuindzhi Center for Contemporary Art and Culture) – 58 Heorhiivska St, Mariupol (destroyed by Russian shelling March 21, 2022)
  - Museum of Natural History – 5 Teatralna St, Mariupol
  - Mariupol Regional Museum of Local Lore (Mariupol Museum of Local History) – 20 Heorhiivska St, Mariupol. Oversees
    1. Museum of Folk Life – 55 Heorhiivska St, Mariupol
    2. Museum of the History and Ethnography of the Greeks of the Azov Sea Region – 37A Henerala Kurkchy St, Sartana

== Ivano-Frankivsk Oblast ==
- Ivano-Frankivsk
  - Art Museum of Prykarpattia (Ivano-Frankivsk Regional Art Museum) – 8 Maydan Sheptytsʹkoho, Ivano-Frankivsk
  - Ratusha, Ivano-Frankivsk – Rynok Square, Ivano-Frankivsk
- Kryvorivnya
  - Literary-Memorial Museum Franko – Р24, Kryvorivnya
- Kosiv
  - Museum of Liberation Struggles of the Carpathian Region – Nezalezhnosti St, Kosiv
- Kolomyya
  - National Museum of Hutsulshchyna and Pokuttia Folk Art – 25 Teatralna St, Kolomyya. Oversees:
    1. Kosiv Museum of Hutsulshchyna Folk Art and Life – 55 Nezalezhnosti St, Kosiv
    2. Pysanka Museum – 43B Vyacheslav Chornovil Ave, Kolomyya
    3. Museum of Ethnography and Ecology of the Carpathians – 269 Svobody St, Yaremche
- Verkhovyna
  - House-Museum of the film "Shadows of Forgotten Ancestors," – Verkhovyna
  - Hutsul Museum – Р24, Verkhovyna
  - Roman Kumlyk Museum of Musical Instruments – Verkhovyna
- Yabluniv
  - Museum "Wooden Sculpture" (Museum Igor Fartushny) – Yabluniv
- Yaremche
  - Park-Museum "Carpathians in miniature" – Yaremche

== Kharkiv Oblast ==
- Kharkiv
  - M. F. Sumtsov Kharkiv Historical Museum – 5 Universytetska St, Kharkiv
  - Kharkiv Art Museum (shelled by Russian missiles March, 2022) – 11 Zhon Myronosyts St, Kharkiv

== Kherson Oblast ==
- Kherson
  - Kherson Regional Museum of Local Lore (Kherson Museum of Local History) – 9 Soborna St, Kherson
  - Oleksiy Shovkunenko Kherson Regional Art Museum (Kherson Art Museum) – 34 Soborna St, Kherson (looted by Russian troops November 2022)

== Khmelnytskyi Oblast ==
- Kamianets-Podilskyi
  - Kamianets-Podilskyi Castle – 1 Zamkowa St, Kamyanets-Podilskyi
  - Kamianets-Podilskyi State Historical Museum-Reserve – 1 Ioanno-Predtechynska St, Kamyanets-Podilskyi
  - Khmelnytski Oblast Art Museum – 11 Piatnytska St, Kamyanets-Podilskyi
  - Miniature Museum of Ukrainian Castles – Kamyanets-Podilskyi
- Shepetivka
  - Khmelnytskyi Regional Literary-Memorial Museum M. Ostrovsky – 2 Ostrovskoho St, Shepetivka

== Kirovohrad Oblast ==
- Kropyvnytskyi
  - Alexander Alexandrovich Osmorkin Art Memorial Museum – 89 Teatralna St, Kropyvnytskyi
  - Kirovohrad Regional Art Museum – 60 Bolshaya Perspektivnaya St, Kropyvnytskyi
  - Korlyuhivka
  - Khutir Nadia ("Village of Hope" Ivan Karpenko-Karyi State Museum-Reserve, Tobilevich) – Korlyuhivka On the grounds:
    1. Museum of Choreographic Art
- Znamianka - Znamianka Local History Museum
- Pobuzke
  - Strategic missile forces museum in Ukraine – Pobuzke

== Kyiv ==
- Ukraine State Aviation Museum (Oleg Antonov State Aviation Museum) – 1 Medova St
- L.I. Bodnarchuk Museum of Beekeeping (Ukraine National Beekeeping Museum) – 19 Akademika Zabolotnoho St
- Holodomor Genocide Museum – 3 Lavrska St
- National Folk Decorative Art Museum – 5 Lavrska Street, building 29
- Museum of Books and Publishing of Ukraine – 9 Lavrska St building 9/10
- National Museum of Ukrainian Folk Decorative Art – 9 Lavrska St
- Museum of Theater, Music and Cinema of Ukraine – 9 Lavrska St, building 26
- Ukrainian Treasures Museum – 9 Lavrska St
- Mykola Siadrystyi Micro Miniatures Museum – 9 Lavrska St
- Mystetskyi Arsenal National Art and Culture Museum Complex (Mystetskyi Arsenal) – 10-12 Lavrska St
- Ivan Honchar Museum (National Center of Folk Culture) – 19 Lavrska St
- Museum of The History of Ukraine in World War II – 27 Lavrska St
- Mikhail Bulgakov Museum (Literature-Memorial Museum to Mikhail Bulgakov) – 13А Andriivs'kyi descent
- Ukrainian National Chernobyl Museum – 1 Provulok Khoryva
- Kyiv Museum of Electric Transportation
- Kyiv Fortress – 24А Vulytsya Hospitalna
- Mykhailo Hrushevsky Memorial Museum – 9 Pankivska St
- Mamayeva Sloboda (Cossack Village) – 2 Mykhaila Dontsya St
- Kyiv Metro Museum – 35 Peremohy Ave
- Museum of Modern Art of Ukraine – 41 Kyrylivska St
- National Art Museum of Ukraine – 6 Mykhaila Hrushevskoho St
- Museum of Kyiv Life in the First Half of the 19th Century (formerly Kyiv Museum of Alexander Pushkin) – 9 Vulytsya Kudryavska
- Kyiv Railway Museum – 4 Heorhiia Kirpy St
- Maxym Rylsky Museum – 7 Maksyma Ryl's'koho St
- Museum of Western and Oriental Art (Bogdan and Varvara Khanenko Museum of Art) – 15 Tereshchenkivska St
- Pinchuk Art Centre – St. Velyka Vasylkivska, 1 Baseina St
- Pyrohovo Open Air Museum (National Museum of Folk Architecture and Life of Ukraine) – Akademika Tronʹka St
- Shcherbenko Art Centre – 22B Mykhailivska St
- Toilet History Museum – 22 Rybalska St
- Pavlo Tychyna Museum – 5 Tereshchenkivska St
- National Museum of the History of Ukraine – 2 Volodymyrs'ka St
  - National Museum of the History of Ukraine in the Second World War
- National Museum-Preserve of Ukrainian military achievements
- Museum of Outstanding Figures of Ukrainian Culture – 97 Saksahanskoho St.
- Museum of Water – 1В, Mykhaila Hrushevskoho St
- Maria Zankovetska Museum – 121 Velyka Vasylkivska St

== Kyiv Oblast ==
- Ivankiv
  - Ivankiv District Historical and Local History Museum – 15 Shevchenka St, Ivankiv
- Pereiaslav
  - Museum of Ancient Architecture Pereyasliv – 34 Mykhaila Sikorskoho St, Pereiaslav
  - Museum-Diorama "Battle for the Dnipro in the Pereyaslava District in Autumn 1943" – Pereiaslav
  - Museum of Folk Life and Architecture of Middle Naddnipryanshyna – 61 Litopysna St, Pereiaslav. Includes:
    1. Museum of Space Exploration – Pereiaslav
    2. Nikolay Benardos Museum – Pereiaslav
    3. Museum of the Cossack Pledge – Pereiaslav
    4. Museum of the Postal Station – Pereiaslav
    5. Museum of the Ukrainian Ryschuk Embroidered Towel – Pereiaslav
  - Museum of Kobzar Art – 20 Bohdana Khmel'nyts'koho St, Pereiaslav
  - Trypillia Culture Museum – 10 Shevchenka St, Pereiaslav
  - H.S. Skovoroda Memorial Museum – 52 Skovorody St, Pereiaslav
- Trypillya
  - Kyiv Regional Archeological Museum – 12 Vulytsya Heroyiv Trypillya, Trypillya
- Novi Petrivtsi
  - Mezhyhirya Residence (Former Viktor Yanukovych Estate) – Novi Petrivtsi

== Luhansk Oblast ==
- Luhansk
  - Aviation Technical Museum – Luhansk
  - Luhansk Regional Museum of Local Lore (Luhansk Museum of Local History) – 30 Karla Marksa St, Luhansk

== Lviv Oblast ==
- Brody
  - Brody Museum of History and District Ethnography – 5 Svoboda Square, Brody
- Drohobych
  - Drohobych Museum of Local Lore (Drohobych Museum of Local History) – 38 Taras Shevchenko St, Drohobych
- Lviv
  - Lviv Arsenal
  - Korniakt Palace
  - Borys Voznytsky Lviv National Art Gallery. Oversees
    1. Lozinsky Palace – the main building, on 3 Stefanyka street
    2. Potocki Palace – 15 Kopernyka street
    3. Boim Chapel – 1 Katedralna Square
    4. Museum of Ancient Ukrainian Books – 15a Kopernyka street, near Potocki Palace
    5. Rusalka Dnistrova Museum – 40 Kopernyka street
    6. Church of St. John the Baptist – 1 Pidhirna street
    7. Johann Georg Pinsel Museum – 2 Mytna street
    8. Memorial Museum-workshop of Teodozia Bryzh – 5 Martovycha street
    9. Mykhailo Dzyndra Museum of Modern Sculpture – 16 Muzeyna street, Briukhovychi
    10. Olesko Castle – Olesko
    11. Pidhirtsi Castle – Pidhirtsi
    12. Markiyan Shashkevych Memorial Museum – Pidlyssia, Zolochiv Raion.
    13. Zolochiv Castle Memorial Museum – Zolochiv
    14. Hetman Ivan Vyhovsky Museum – Ruda, Stryi Raion.
    15. Pyatychanska Tower – Pyatychany, Zhydachiv Raion
    16. Museum of Zhydachiv Land – Zhydachiv.
  - Andrey Sheptytsky National Museum of Lviv
  - Pharmacy Museum, Lviv
- Zolochiv
  - Zolochiv Castle – Ternopilska St, Zolochiv

== Mykolaiv Oblast ==
- Berezanka
  - Berezanka District Folk History Museum 70 Lenin St, Berezanka
- Mykolaiv
  - Mykolaiv Regional Museum of Local History – 29 Naberezhna St, Mykolaiv
  - V. V. Vereshchagin Mykolaiv Art Museum – 29 Naberezhna St, Mykolaiv
  - Mykolaiv Museum of Shipbuilding and Fleet – 4 Admiralska St, 4, Mykolaiv
  - Museum of Partisan Movement in Mykolaiv in the Great Patriotic War of 1941-1944 – 5 Lyahina St, Mykolaiv
- Ochakiv
  - R. G. Sudkovsky Museum of Marine Painting – 13 Starofortechna St, Ochakiv

== Odesa Oblast ==
- Odesa
  - Catacomb of Kantakuzena – 7 Bunina St, Odesa
  - F. P. De Volana Museum of Odesa Maritime Trade – 1 Lanzheronivsky Descent, Odesa
  - O. Bleschunov Museum of Private Collections – 19 Polska St, Odesa
  - Museum of the Cinema – 33 Frantsuzky Blvd, Odesa
  - Museum of Contraband – 6 Katerynynska St, Odesa
  - Museum of Filiki Eteriya – 18 Chervonyi Ln, Odesa
  - Museum-Apartment of Leonid Utyosov – Utosova St, 11, Odesa
  - Museum of the History of Jews in Odesa "Migdal-Shorashim" (Jewish Museum of Odesa) – 66 Nizhynska St, Odesa
  - Museum of Interesting Science – 4E Shevchenka Ave, Odesa
  - Museum of Modern Art of Odesa – 5 Leontovycha St, Odesa
  - Odesa Archeological Museum – 4 Lanzheronivska St, Odesa
  - Odesa Brick Museum – 58 Novoselskogo, Odesa
  - Odesa Regional Museum of Local Lore (Odesa Museum of Local History) – 4 Havanna St, Odesa
  - Odesa Literature Museum – 2 Lanzheronivska St, Odesa
  - Odesa National Art Museum – Potocki Palace, 5a Sofiyska, Odesa
  - Odesa Museum of Western and Eastern Art – 9 Pushkinska St, Odesa
  - Odesa Numismatics Museum – 33 Hretska Street, Odesa
  - Odesa Pushkin Museum – 13 Pushkinska St, Odesa
  - N.L. Shustov Cognac Museum – 13 Melnytska St, Odesa

== Poltava Oblast ==
- Poltava
  - Volodimir Korolenka Literary Memorial Museum – 1 Korolenka St, Poltava
  - Estate of Ivan Kotlyarevskyi Museum – 3 Sobornyi Square, Poltava
  - Vasyl Krychevsky Poltava Local History Museum (Poltava Local Lore Museum) – 2 Konstytutsii St, Poltava
  - Anton S. Makarenko Museum-Reserve – 1-2 Muzey Makarenka St, Kovalivka
  - Museum of Military Conflicts of the Twentieth Century – 5 Parkova St, Poltava
  - Panas Myrnoho Literary Memorial Museum – 56 Panasa Myrnoho St, Poltava
  - Poltava Art Museum – 5 Yevropeiska St, Poltava
  - Poltava Museum of Aviation and Aerospace – 16 Pershotravnevyi Ave, Poltava
  - Poltava Museum of Long-range Strategic Aviation – 1 Oleksandra Zasyadka Street, Poltava
- Opishnya
  - National Museum-Reserve of Ukrainian Pottery – 102 Partyzanska St, Opishnya
  - Museum-manor of the Poshivayl family – Zalyvchoho St, Opishnya
  - Museum-Estate Alexandra Selyuchenko – 29 Hubarya St, Opishnya

== Rivne Oblast ==
- Kostopil
  - Forest Museum – Р05, Kostopil
  - Kostopil Regional Museum of Local Lore (Kostopil Museum of Local History) – 16 Hrushevskoho St, Kostopil
- Ostroh
  - Ostroh Castle – Ostroh
- Peresopnytsya
  - Derevyana Fortress Museum – Peresopnytsya
- Rivne
  - Amber Museum – 17 Symona Petlyury St, Rivne
  - Rivne Regional Museum of Local Lore (Rivne Museum of Local History) – 19 Drahomanova St, Rivne

== Sumy Oblast ==
- Bilopillya
  - Anton S. Makarenko Museum – Staroputivlska St, Bilopillya
- Lebedyn
  - B.K. Rudneva Municipal Art Museum of Lebedyn – 17 Voli Square, Lebedyn
  - Lebedyn Regional Museum of Local Lore (Lebedyn Museum of Local History) – 37 Taras Shevchenka St, Lebedyn
- Sumy
  - Museum of Banking history in the Sumy oblast and the History of Ukrainian Money – 9/1 Pokrovska St, Sumy
  - Sumy Regional Museum of Local Lore (Sumy Museum of Local History) – 2 Herasima Kondratieva St, Sumy
  - Nikanor Onatsky Regional Art Museum in Sumy – 1 Pokrovskaya Square, Sumy

== Ternopil Oblast ==
- Berezhany
  - Berezhany Book Museum – 1 Rynok Square, 1, Berezhany
- Buchach
  - Buchach Museum of Local Lore – 55 Halytska St, Buchach
- Monastyryska
  - Museum of Lemko Culture and Life – 59 Taras Shevchenko St, Monastyryska
- Staryi Skalat
  - Lesya Kurbasa Memorial Museum-Estate – Staryi Skalat
- Ternopil
  - Memorial Museum for Political Prisoners – 1 Kopernyka St, Ternopil
  - Ternopil Regional Museum of Local Lore (Ternopil Museum of Local History) – 3 Euromaidan Heroes Square, Ternopil
  - Ternopil Regional Art Museum – 1 Solomii Krushelnytskoi St, Ternopil
  - Ternopil Castle – 12 Zamkova St, Ternopil
- Zbarazh
  - Zbarazh Castle (Zbarazh Local History Museum) – Zbarazh

== Vinnytsia Oblast ==
- Stryzhavka
  - Werwolf Museum and Historical Construction – Turystychna, Stryzhavka
- Tymanivka
  - Suvorov Museum – Т0222, Tymanivka
- Vinnytsia
  - Museum of Retro Technology (Museum Avtomotovelofototeleradio) – 1 Soborna St, Vinnytsia
  - Vinnytsia Local History Museum (Regional Museum of Local Lore) – 19 Soborna St, Vinnytsia
  - Vinnytsia Regional Museum of Art – 21 Soborna St, Vinnytsia
  - Museum of Transport Models – 24 Soborna St, Vinnytsia
  - Jacob Balabana Museum of the Ukrainian Stamp – 26-28 Soborna St, Vinnytsia
  - Museum-Manor of M. Kotsyubynskyi – 15 Ivana Bevza St, Vinnytsia
  - National Pirogov's Estate Museum – 155 Pyrohova St, Vinnytsia
  - Science Museum – 51 Mykoly Ovodova St, Vinnytsia

== Volyn Oblast ==
- Kolodyazhne
  - Museum of Lesya Ukrainkat – 53 Lesi Ukrayinky St,
- Lutsk
  - Museum of Bells – Vladycha Tower, 1а Kafedralna St, Lutsk
  - Museum of Ukrainian Troops and Military Equipment – 4 Na Taboryshchi St, Lutsk
  - Korsak Art Museum – 1 Karbysheva St, Lutsk
  - Museum of the Volyn Icon – 5 Yaroshchuka St, Lutsk
  - Volyn Regional Historical Museum – 20 Shopena St, Lutsk
- Rokyni
  - Museum of the History of Agriculture in Volyn – 1 Shkilna, Rokyni
- Volodymyr
  - Volodymyr-Volynsky Historical Museum (O. M. Dvernytskyi Volodymyr Historical Museum) – 6 Ivana Franka St, Volodymyr

== Zakarpattia Oblast ==
- Berehove
  - Museum of Berehivshchyna – Palats Hrafa Habora Betlena, 1Gabora Betlena St, Berehove
- Karpaty
  - Shenbornov Palace (Palace of Counts Schönborn) – Е50, Karpaty
- Mukachevo
  - Palanok Castle – Zamkova Gora Street, Mukachevo
- Uzhhorod
  - Transcarpathian Regional Art Museum of Joseph Bokshay – 3 Zhupanatska Square, Uzhhorod
  - Uzhhorod Museum of Folk Architecture and Life – 33A Kapitulna St, Uzhhorod
  - Uzhhorod Сastle (Tyvodar Lehotsky Transcarpathian Museum of Regional History) – 33 Kapitulna St, Uzhhorod
  - Zoological Museum of Uzhhorod State University – 54 Voloshyna St, Uzhhorod

== Zaporizhzhia Oblast ==
- Melitopol
  - Melitopol Museum of Local Lore (Melitopol Museum of Local History) – 18 Mykhaila Hrushevskoho St, Melitopol
- Vasylivka
  - Popov Manor House (Vasylivka Historical and Architectural Museum-Reserve) – 12 Haharina St, Vasylivka
- Vilnyansk
  - Vilnyansk Museum of Local Lore (Vilnyansk Museum of Local History) – Vilnyansk
- Zaporizhzhia
  - Khortytsia – Zaporizhzhia Oversees:
    1. Historical and Cultural Complex Zaporizhian Sich (Zaporizhian Cossack Museum) – 10 Ctary Redyt St, Zaporizhzhia
    2. Khortytsa Island Museum – 164 H08, Zaporizhzhia
  - Zaporizhzhia Regional Art Museum – 76B Nezalezhnoi Ukrainy St, Zaporizhzhia
  - Zaporizhzhia Regional Museum of Local Lore (Zaporizhzhia Museum of Local History) – 29/16 Troitska St, Zaporizhzhia
  - Faeton Museum – 8 Vyborz'ka St, Zaporizhzhia
  - Museum of High Voltage Equipment – 1 Dniprovske Hwy, Zaporizhzhia
  - Museum of the History of Weapons – 189 Sobornyi Ave, Zaporizhzhia

== Zhytomyr Oblast ==
- Radomyshl
- Radomysl Castle – 15 Pletenetska St, Radomyshl. Oversees:
1. Museum of Ukrainian Home Icons
- Zhytomyr
  - Literary and Memorial Museum of V. G. Korolenko – 1 Korolenka Square, Zhytomyr
  - Zhytomyr Region History Museum – 1 Zamkova Square, Zhytomyr
  - Sergei Pavlovich Korolyov Museum of Cosmonautics
  - Ukrainian Culture House – 61 Velyka Berdychivska St, Zhytomyr

== See also ==
- Lists of museums
- Tourism in Ukraine
- Culture of Ukraine
- List of art museums and galleries in Ukraine
