= Museum of Aviation and Cosmonautics of Chernihiv Region =

- Музей авіації та космонавтики Чернігівщини
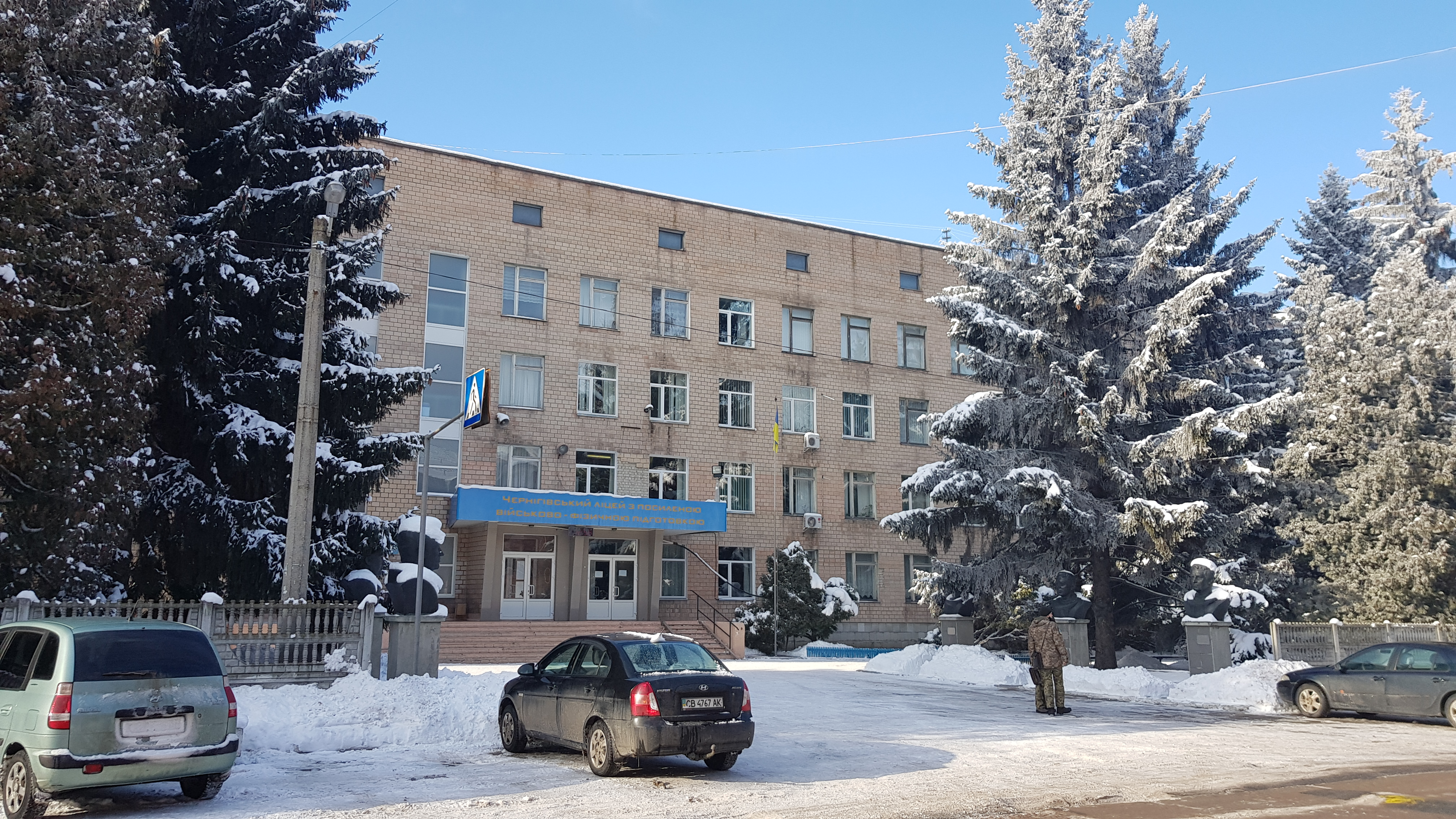
- Established: 1971
- Location: Streletska Street 4, Chernihiv, Ukraine
- Coordinates: 51°31′17″N 31°17′10″E
- Director: Vitaliy Vasilyevich Yatsenko

The Museum of Aviation and Cosmonautics of Chernihiv Region (Ukrainian: Музей авіації та космонавтики Чернігівщини) is a museum located in Street Streletska, 1 in the city of Chernihiv nearby the Aviators Square.

== History ==
The museum was created in 1971, at the Chernihiv Higher Military Aviation School. A few years earlier exactly on May 25, 1964, Yuri Gagarin on a visit to Chernihiv visited the school. In 2010, "Union of Veterans of the Armed Forces of Ukraine" and, in particular, its president Volodymyr Fomych Kuzmenkov made significant efforts in the organization and the museum was included in the public museums of Chernihiv. In 2018, there was a project to place open-air exhibitions between Kursanta Yeskova and Yuriy Mezentseva streets, south of Aviators Square.

== Description ==
The collections consist of educational aids: aircraft, weapons, stands and other similar objects. The exhibition consists of two parts: an outdoor parking lot and the museum rooms inside the building. There are exhibits in the open air - training aircraft (Aero L-29 Delfín, Aero L-39 Albatros), combat training aircraft (Mikoyan-Gurevich MiG-15, Mikoyan-Gurevich MiG-21, MiG-23UB), combat aircraft (MiG-17, MiG-21PF and MiG-23M).

== See also ==
- List of museums in Chernihiv
- List of museums in Ukraine
