= Chernihiv Military History Museum =

- Чернігівський військово-історичний музей
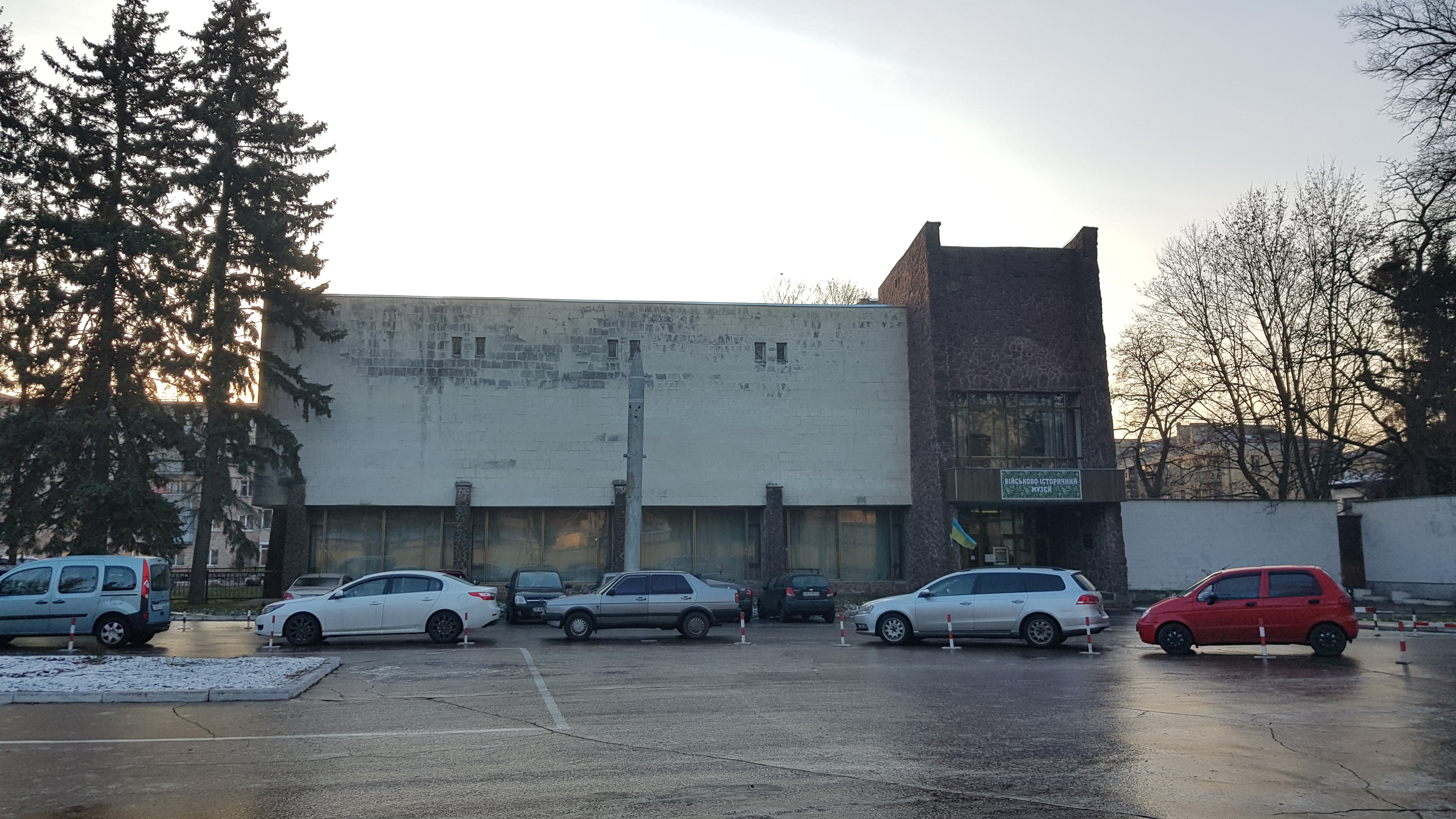
- Established: 1985
- Location: Shevchenko St., 55 A, Chernihiv, Ukraine
- Coordinates: 51°29′52″N 31°19′08″E
- Director: Serhiy Laevsky
- Website: choim.org

The Chernihiv Military History Museum (Ukrainian: Чернігівський військово-історичний музей) or Chernihiv Museum of Military Glory - a museum in Chernihiv, a department of the Chernihiv Regional Historical Museum named after V. V. Tarnovsky. The museum was moved twice before ending up in the current location, where it was ceremonially opened on May 9 (Victory Day) in 1981 by the Soviet leader Leonid Brezhnev. On 21 June 1996, the museum was accorded its current status of the National Museum by the special decree signed by Leonid Kuchma, the then-President of Ukraine.

== History ==
The Chernihiv Museum of Battle Glory was created on the initiative and with the participation of veterans of the former 1st Guards Army in a specially constructed building as a museum on a non-profit basis. The exhibition was opened in 1985 to mark the 40th anniversary of the victory in the German-Soviet War. In 1986, the museum was transformed into a department of the Chernihiv Historical Museum. A bas-relief was previously located to the right of the entrance.

On March 13, 2022, the facade and part of the exhibition were damaged by shelling during the Russian invasion of Ukraine.

== Description ==
The museum has collected about 2500 exhibits that reveal the combat path of the former 1st Guards Army during the German-Soviet War, the military-patriotic work of army veterans among young people, the inheritance of traditions, the everyday life of the modern army, the history of the Chernihiv region from 1917 to the present day.

The museum's exposition consists of two sections and a number of permanent and temporary exhibitions. It has an exhibition and film lecture hall. The section "The Battle Path of the Former 1st Guards Army" was built in 1985. In 1999, its full re-exhibition was held. The section "Military History of Chernihiv Region" was built in 1988. During its existence, it has been updated and supplemented, in particular, with such topics as "Military Construction of the Era of the Ukrainian Revolution", "Battle near Kruty", "Participation of Chernihiv Residents in Local Military Conflicts of the Second Half of the 20th Century", "Creation of the Army of Independent Ukraine", "Activities of the Chernihiv Border Detachment". There are permanent exhibitions: “Glory of the Ukrainian Cossacks”, “Chernihiv residents on the fronts of the German-Soviet war”, “Liberation of Chernihiv region from Nazi invaders”, “Ukraine on our shoulders” (dedicated to the participation of Chernihiv residents in the ATO in eastern Ukraine).

The museum's holdings include over 13,000 items, the vast majority of which are related to the German-Soviet War. Collections of monuments dedicated to the First World War, the Ukrainian Revolution, military construction of the 1920s-1930s, the organization and activities of defense societies, the participation of compatriots in the liquidation of the consequences of the Chernobyl accident, and the history of the Chernihiv Higher Military Aviation School of Pilots are also being created. Among the exhibits are documents, photographs, weapons, awards, military equipment, personal belongings, work tools, paintings and graphics, and books. In the open air to the right of the facade of the building, exhibits of military equipment from the German-Soviet War and the War in Eastern Ukraine are placed.

== See also ==
- List of museums in Chernihiv
- List of museums in Ukraine

== Gallery ==
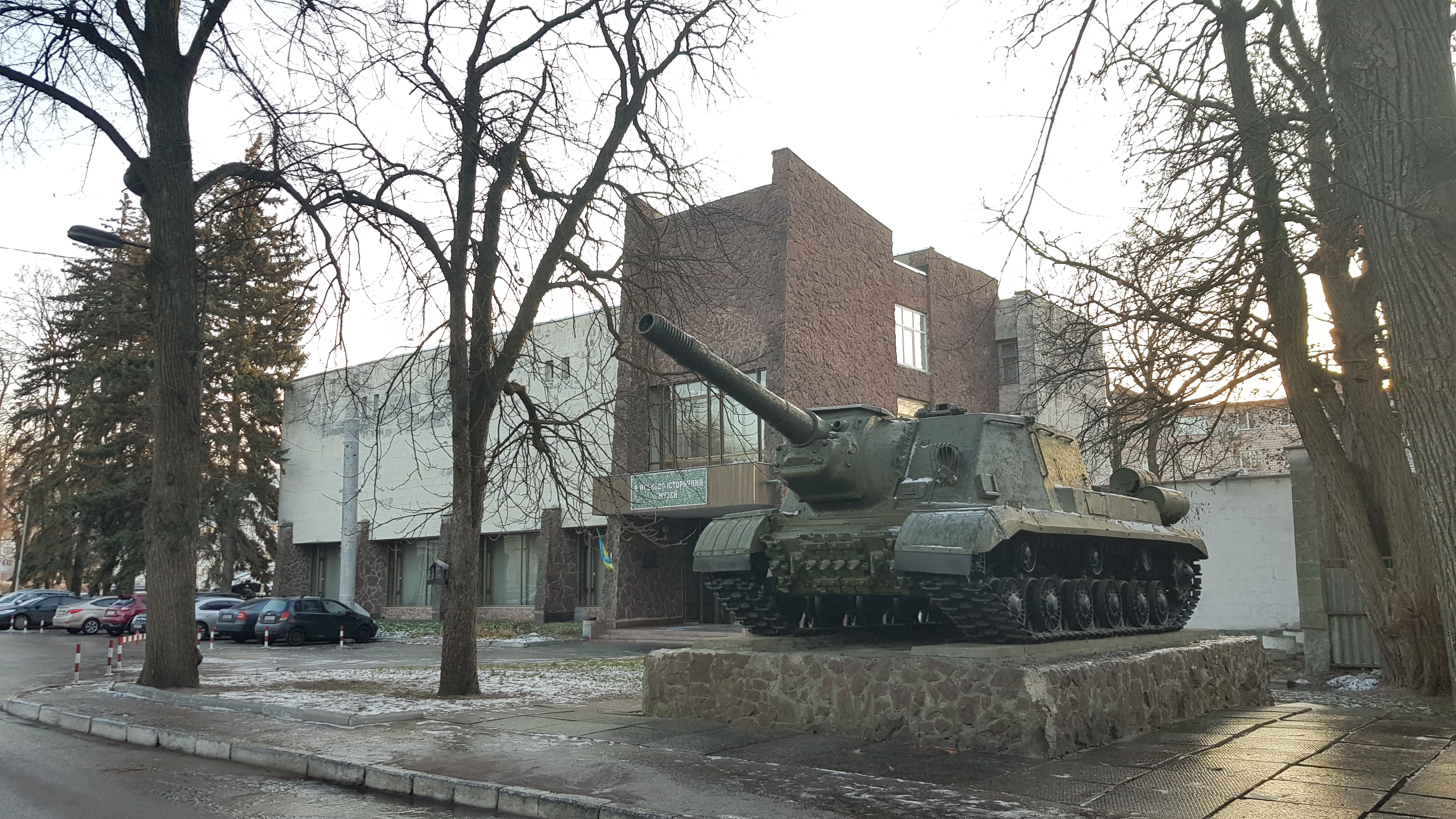
Tank from the German-Soviet War

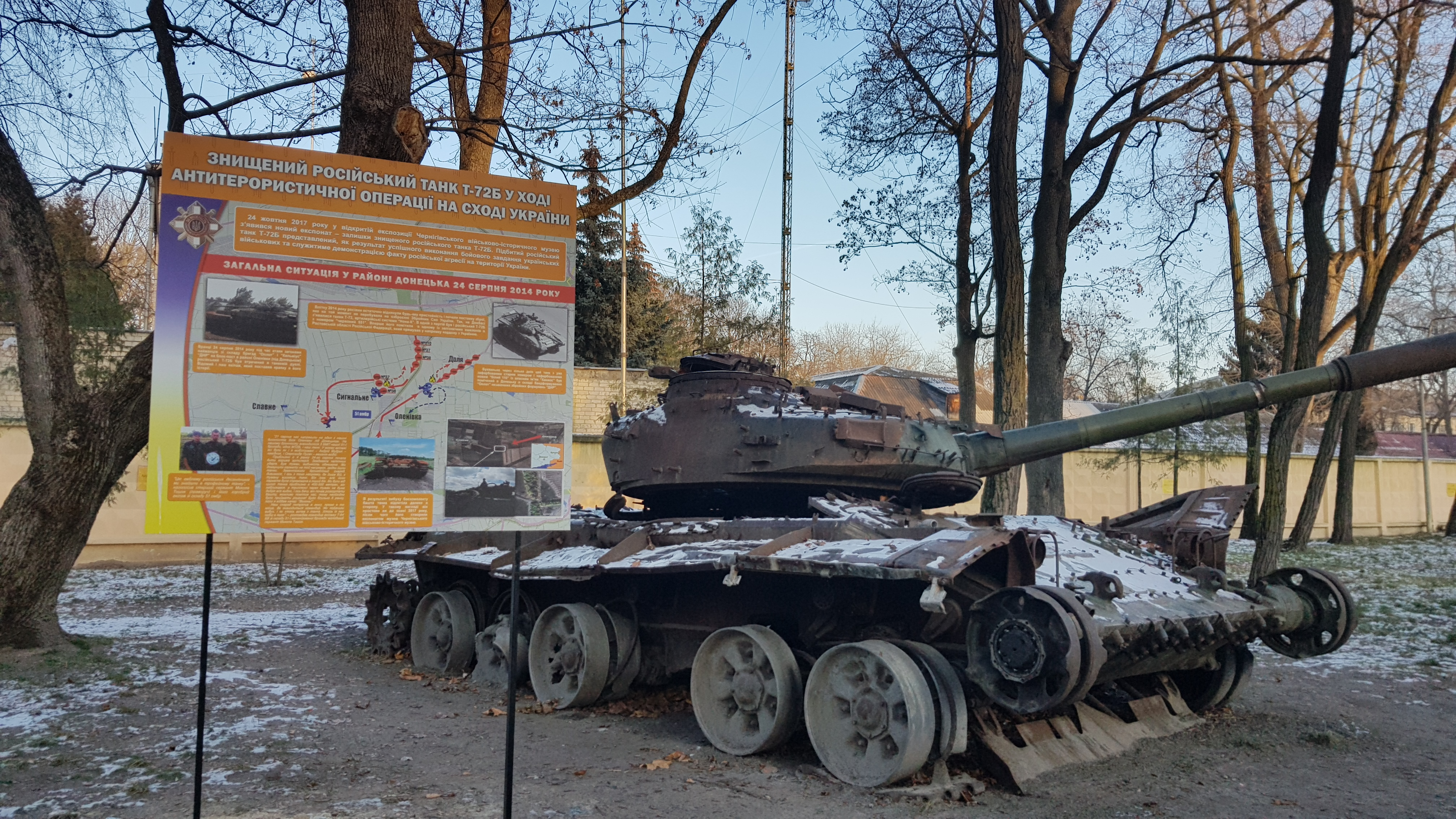
Russian tank destroyed in eastern Ukraine
