= Museum of the History of Liskovytsia =

Museum

- Музей історії Лісковиці
- Established: 2010
- Location: Tolstoy Street, 17 Chernihiv, Ukraine
- Coordinates: 51°29′30″N 31°16′52″E
- Director: Olga Konoval

The Museum of the History of Liskovytsia (Ukrainian: Музей історії Лісковиці) is a museum located in the district of Liskovytsia in the city of Chernihiv, which has been known since the time of Kyivan Rus' as the district where artisans and townspeople lived.

== History ==
A. AND. Varenyk came up with the idea of creating a local historical museum in the city of Chernihiv, the capital of Chernihiv Oblast. Together with a group of people A. AND. Varenyk began creating a museum. The residents of the area were initially skeptical about the idea of this project, although there were more people who supported it. Valentyna Lutska, an employee of the historical museum who created the thematic structure of the museum, advised to "dilute" the numerous photographs with various household items and antiques.

In June 2016, by order of the Ministry of Education and Science of Ukraine with the approval of the decision of the MES commission to award the museums the title "Exemplary Museum".

== Exhibition ==
The exhibitions of the Liskovytsia Museum include the following sections:

- History of School No. 4 of Chernihiv
- Liskovytsia — One of the Christian Centers of Chernihiv
- Liskovytsia in the Period of Kyivan Rus

== Location and opening hours ==
The Liskovytsia History Museum is located on Tolstoy Street 17 in Chernihiv. A little further away is the stop near school No. 4, where the listed taxi route passes. Nearby is the stop "Fabrika lozovyh mebeli" with bus numbers 7, 8, 10, 30 and 36. Museum is open from 8:00 a.m. to 5:00 p.m., and weekends are Saturdays and Sundays same time.

== See also ==
- List of museums in Chernihiv
- List of museums in Ukraine
