= List of museums in Chernihiv =

List of museums in Chernihiv. The city contains vast quantities of priceless art, sculpture and treasures, which are mainly stored in its many museums. The main museums of the city are the Chernihiv Regional Historical Museum named after Vasyl Tarnovsky and the Chernihiv Regional Art Museum named after Hryhoriy Galahan, located in Dytynets Park in the city center. Some museums in the city are at risk in 2022 during the Siege of Chernihiv due to the Russian invasion of Ukraine.

== Museums ==
Picture	Name	Location
	Regional Art Museum	Muzeyna Street 6, Chernihiv, Ukraine
	Regional Historical Museum	Muzeyna Street, 4, Chernihiv, Ukraine
	Museum of Ukrainian Antiquities	Shevchenko Street 63, Chernihiv, Ukraine.
	Chernihiv Military History Museum	Shevchenko Street 55 A, Chernihiv, Ukraine
	Literary Memorial Museum-Reserve of M. M. Kotsiubynsky	Kotsiubynskoho Street 3, Chernihiv, Ukraine
	Museum of Aviation and Cosmonautics	Strilets'ka Street 4, Chernihiv, Ukraine
	Leskovitsa History Museum	Tolstoy Street, 23 Chernihiv Ukraine

== See also ==
- Chernihiv
