= Lutsk urban hromada =

Urban hromada in Volyn Oblast, Ukraine

Lutsk urban hromada Луцька міська громада
- Hromada
- Interactive map of Lutsk urban hromada
- Country: Ukraine
- Oblast: Volyn
- Raion: Lutsk
- Admin. center: Lutsk

Area
  - Total: 383.1 km^{2} (147.9 sq mi)

Population (2022)
  - Total: 236,322
  - Density: 616.9/km^{2} (1,598/sq mi)
- CATOTTG code: UA07080170000013585
- Settlements: 36
- Cities: 1
- Rural settlements: 1
- Villages: 34

Lutsk urban territorial hromada (Ukrainian: Луцька міська територіальна громада, romanized: Lutska miska terytorialna hromada) is a hromada (municipality) located in Volyn Oblast, in western Ukraine. The hromada's administrative centre is the city of Lutsk.

The area of the hromada is 383.1 square kilometres (147.9 mi^{2}), and the population is 236,322 (2022 estimate)

The hromada was established in 2019, as an amalgamated hromada.

== Settlements ==
In addition to one city (Lutsk) and one rural settlement (Rokyni), there are 34 villages in the hromada:

- Antonivka
- Boholiuby
- Bohushivka
- Bryshche
- Bukiv
- Velykyi Omelianyk
- Vsevolodivka
- Horodok
- Dachne
- Zhabka
- Zhydychyn
- Zabolottsi
- Zaborol
- Zmiyinets
- Ivanchytsi
- Klepachiv
- Kniahynynok
- Kulchyn
- Lypliany
- Mylushyn
- Mylushi
- Motashivka
- Nebizhka
- Oderady
- Ozdenizh
- Ozertse
- Oleksandrivka
- Okhotyn
- Prylutske
- Sapohove
- Syrnyky
- Somaky
- Tarasove
- Shepel (village)
