= Chernihiv Literary Memorial Museum-Reserve of M. M. Kotsiubynsky =

Chernihiv Military History Museum
- Чернігівський військово-історичний музей
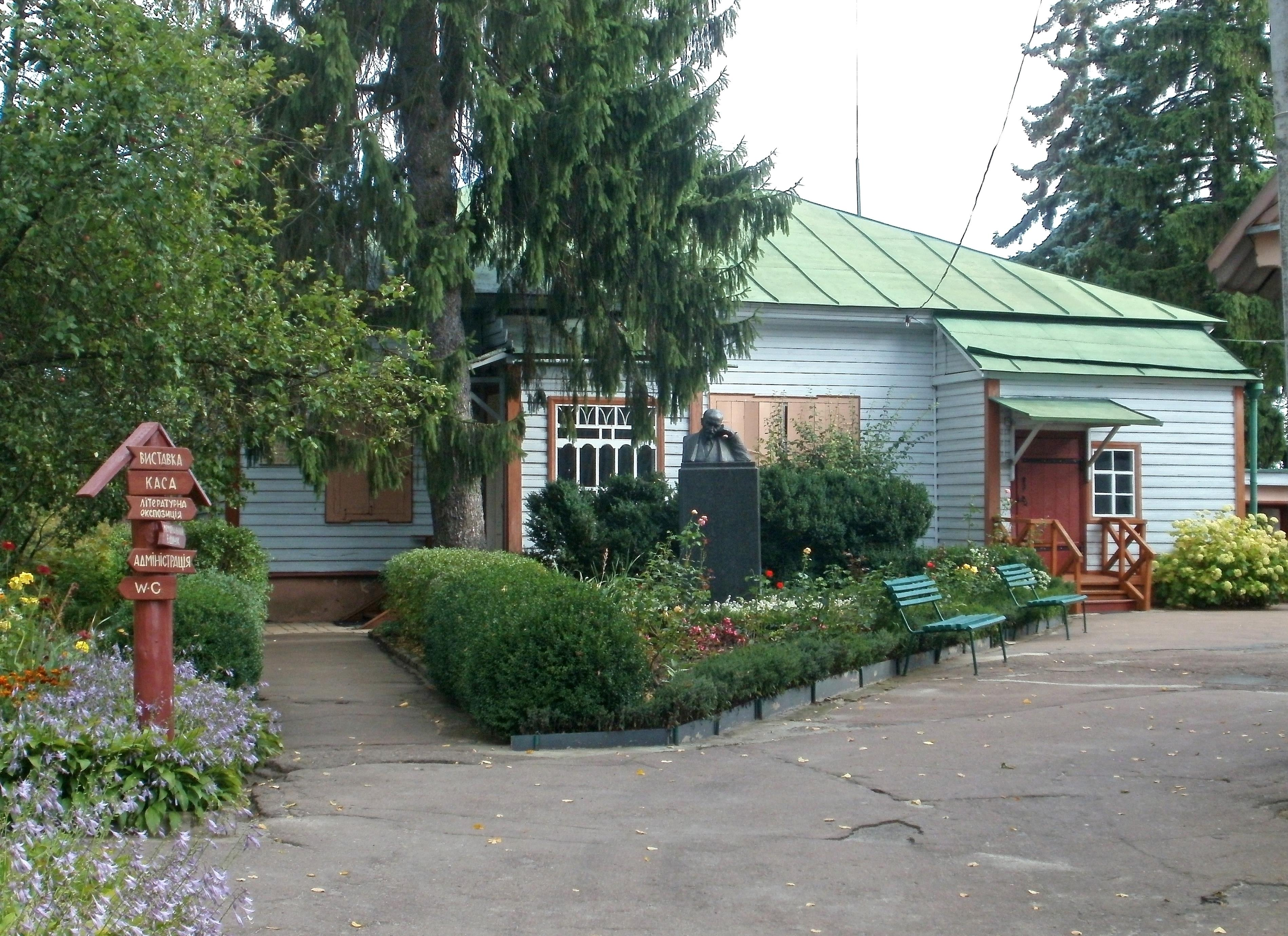
- Established: 1934
- Location: Kotsiubynsky Street 3, Chernihiv, Chernihiv Oblast, Ukraine, 14000
- Coordinates: 51°29′14″N 31°17′14″E
- Type: Art museum, historic site
- Website: https://kotsubinsky.org/

The Chernihiv Literary Memorial Museum-Reserve of M. M. Kotsiubynsky (Ukrainian: Чернігівський літературно-меморіальний музей-заповідник Михайла Коцюбинського) is a literary and memorial museum-reserve dedicated to the life and works of the famous Ukrainian writer of the early 20th century, Mykhailo Kotsiubynsky, located in the writer's former private house in the city of Chernihiv in Kotsyubyns'koho Street 3.

== Description ==
The museum consists of several buildings, including a memorial house, which recreates the atmosphere in which the artist and his family lived. In the courtyard, you can walk through the Kotsiubynsky Memorial Garden, preserved exactly as it looked during the writer's life. Part of the memorial of the exposition is located in the one-story wooden house in which Mykhailo Kotsiubynsky lived from 1898 to 1913. The rooms of the house recreate the atmosphere in which the writer lived with his family. Behind the house is the garden of the Kotsiubynsky family, preserved in the form in which it was during the writer's lifetime, where the plants and flowers he loved are grown. Next to the writer's memorial residence is a modern building for literary exhibitions, built in the 1980s. 20th century The literary exhibition is dedicated to different stages of the writer's career. In this building you can see constant exhibitions of contemporary artists, literary and musical events, etc.

== History ==
In 1934, the Chernigov Literary and Memorial Museum-Reserve was opened on the occasion of the 70th anniversary of the birth of Mykhailo Kotsiubynsky. During World War II, the museum's exhibits were evacuated to Ufa. After the liberation of Chernihiv in June 1944, the museum resumed its activities. In 1992, the museum-reserve initiated the establishment of the Mykhailo Kotsiubynskyi Regional Literary and Art Prize. In March 2022 during the Siege of Chernihiv the museum was shelted and more than ten mines fell around the Kotsiubynskyi Museum in Chernihiv.

== See also ==
- List of museums in Chernihiv
- List of museums in Ukraine

== Gallery ==
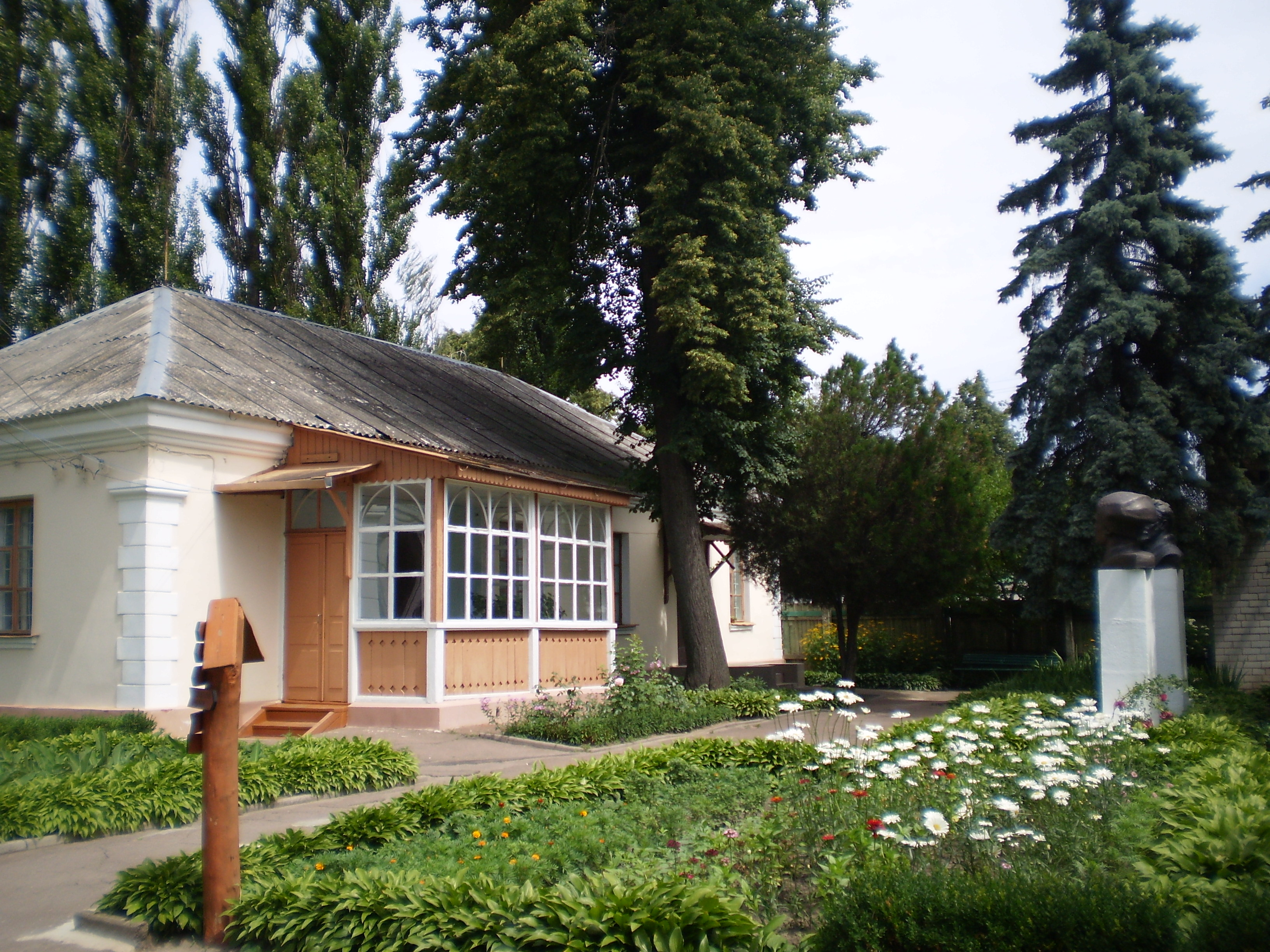

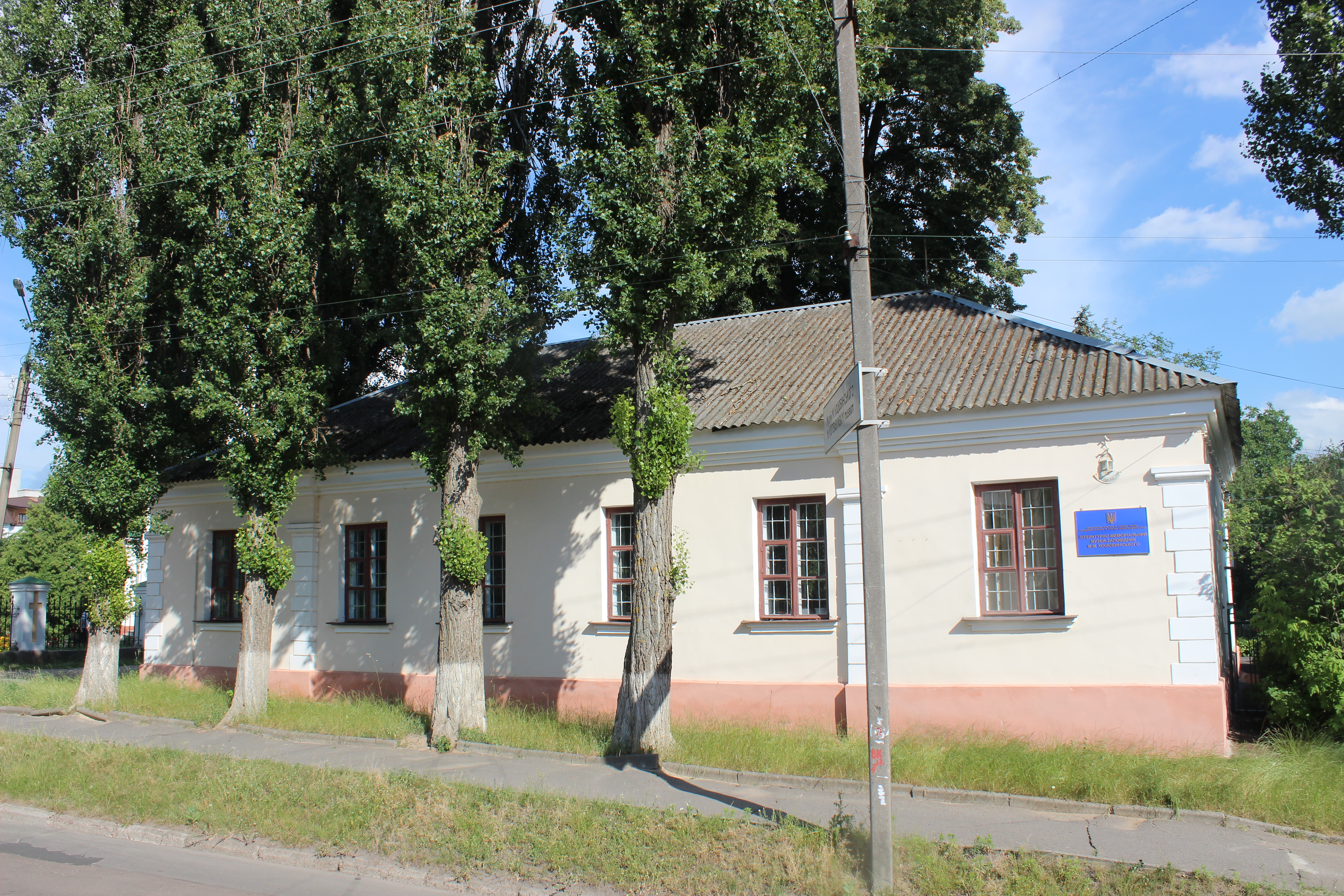

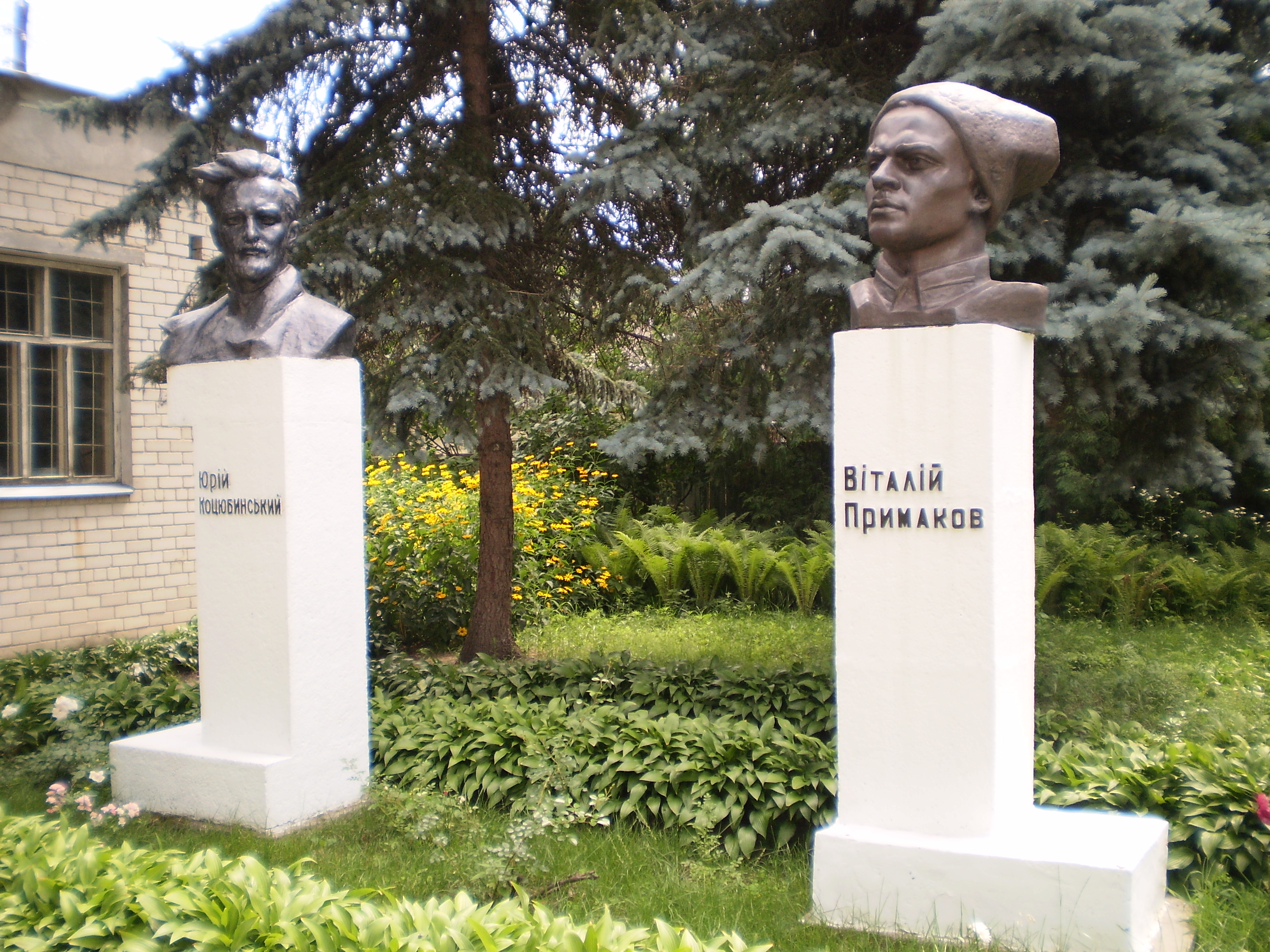

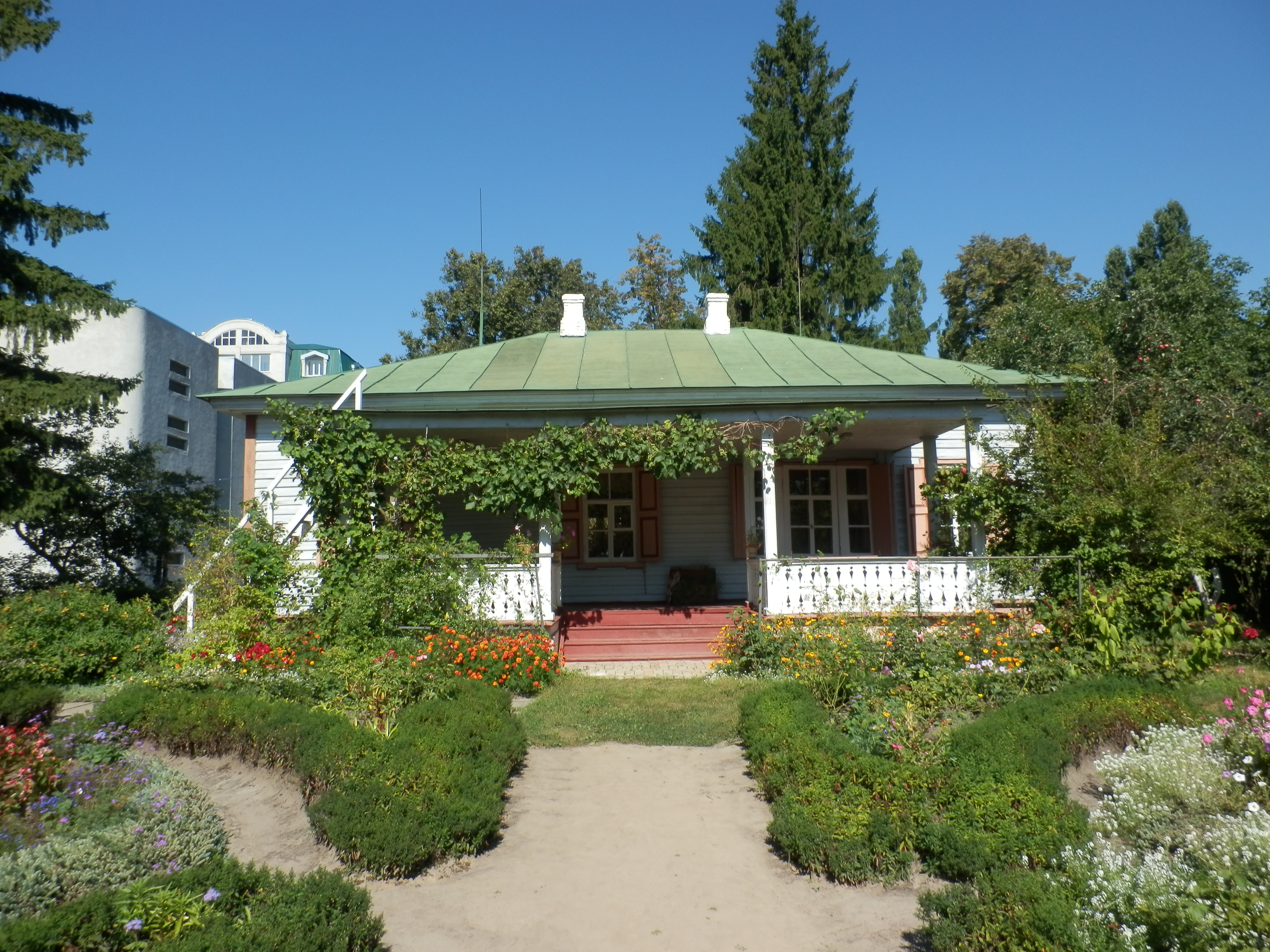

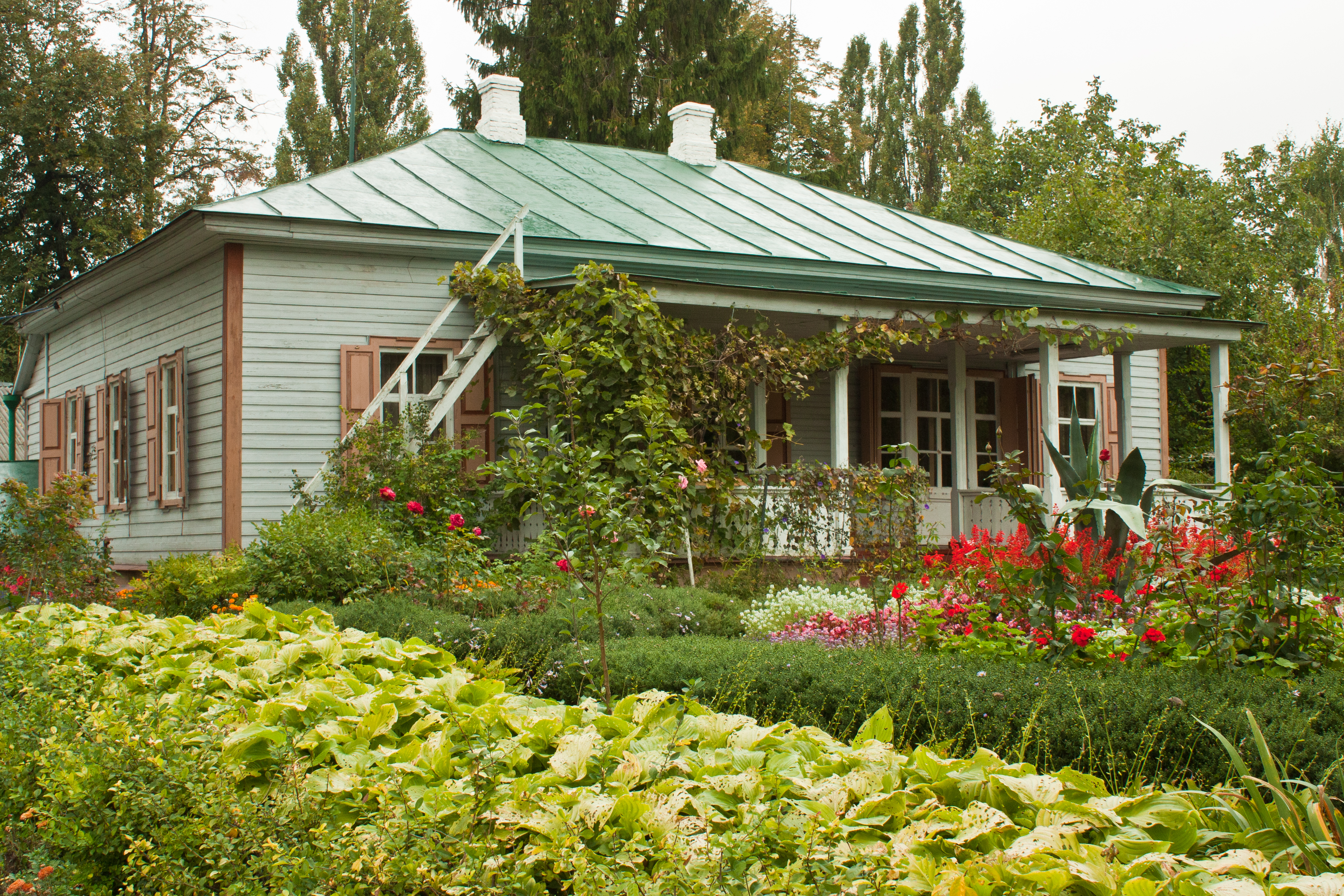

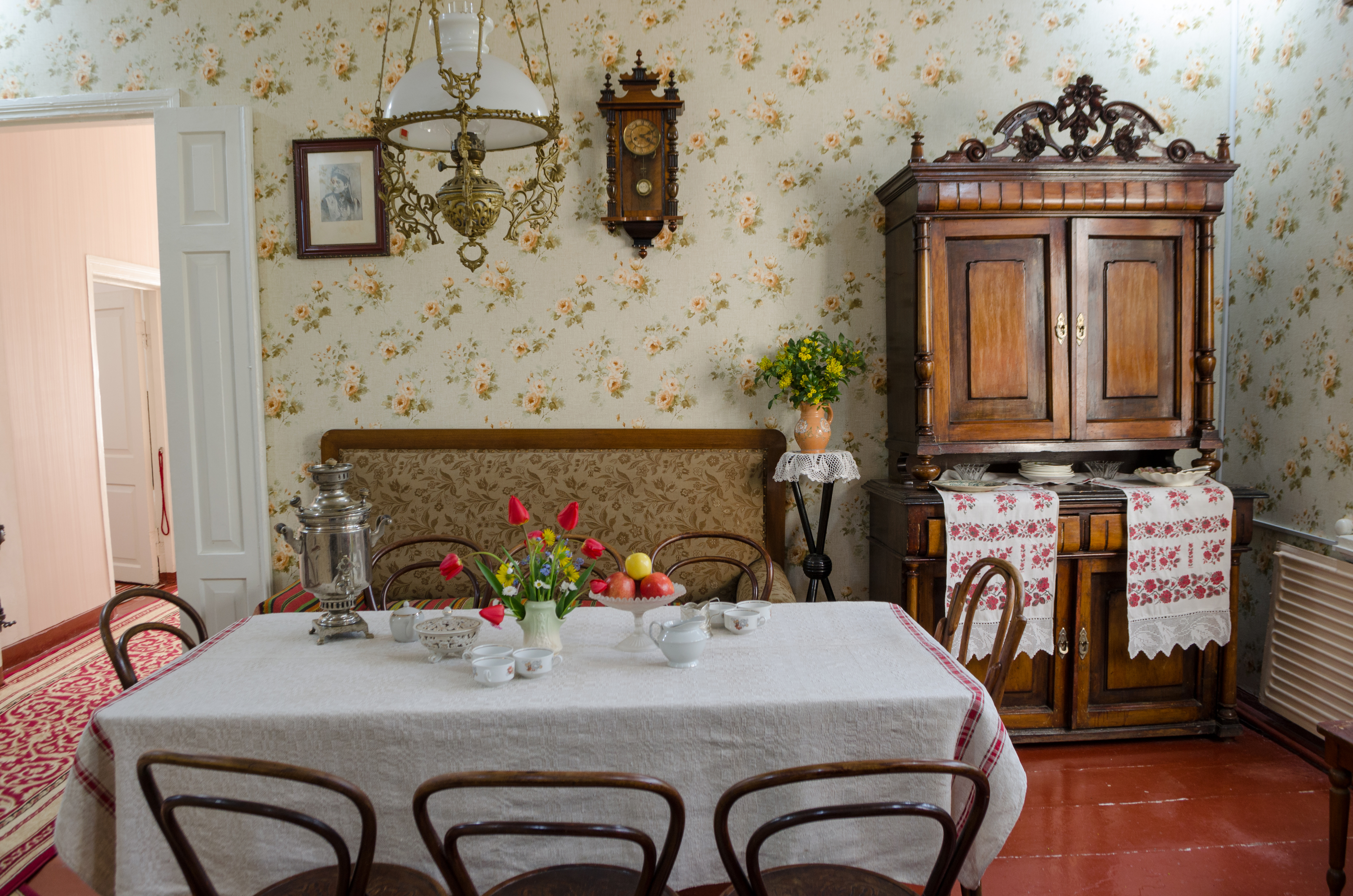

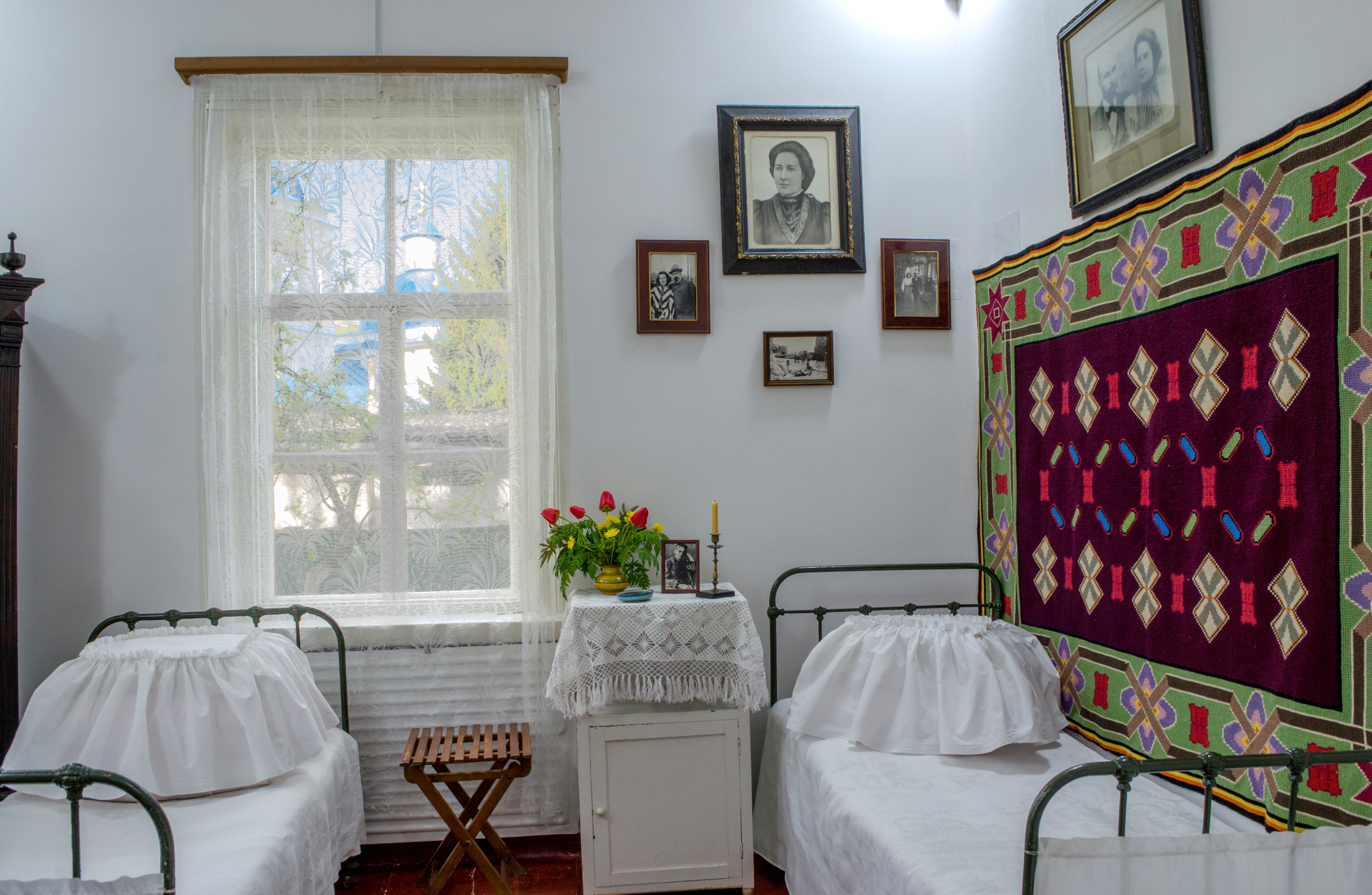

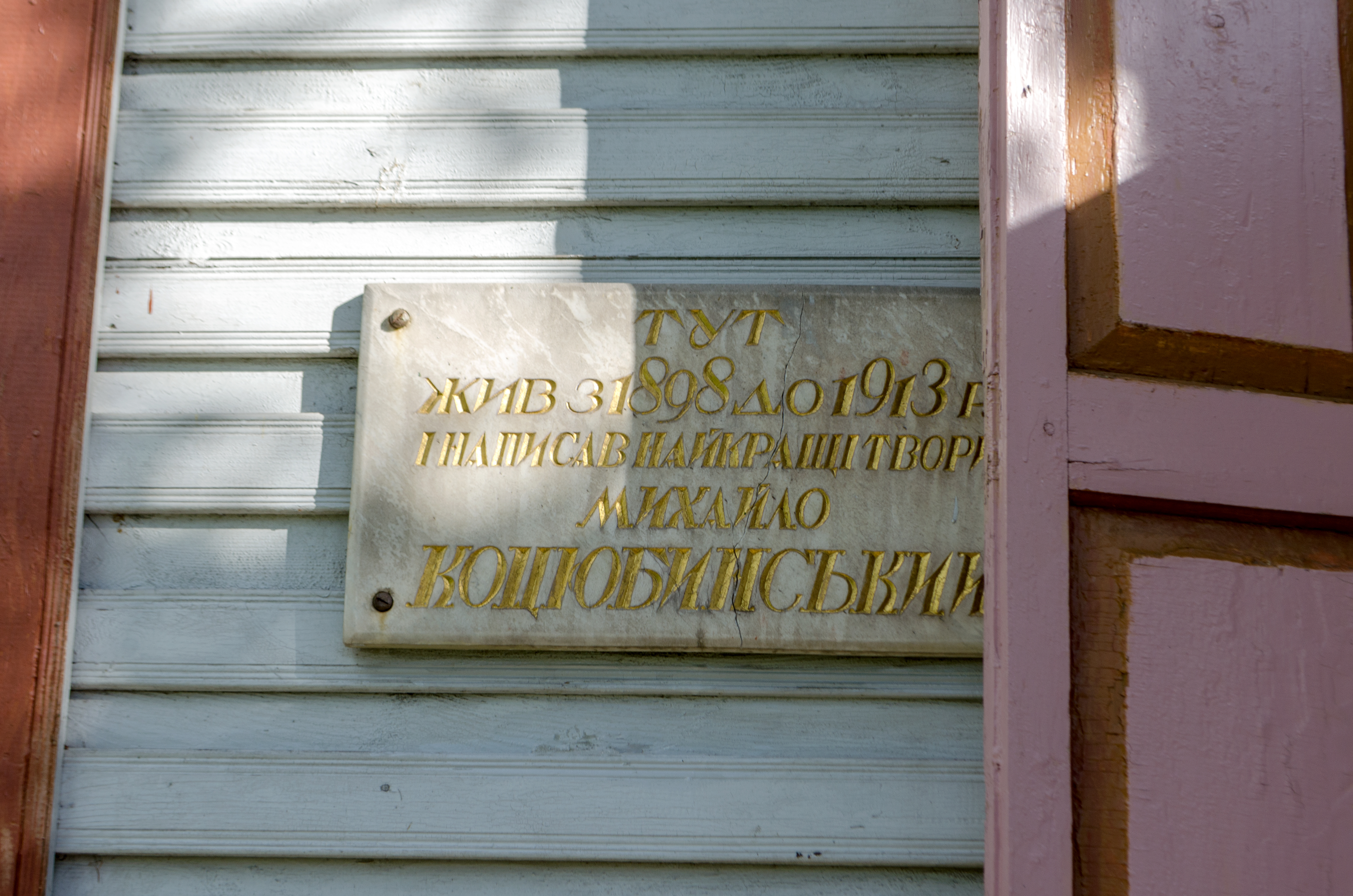

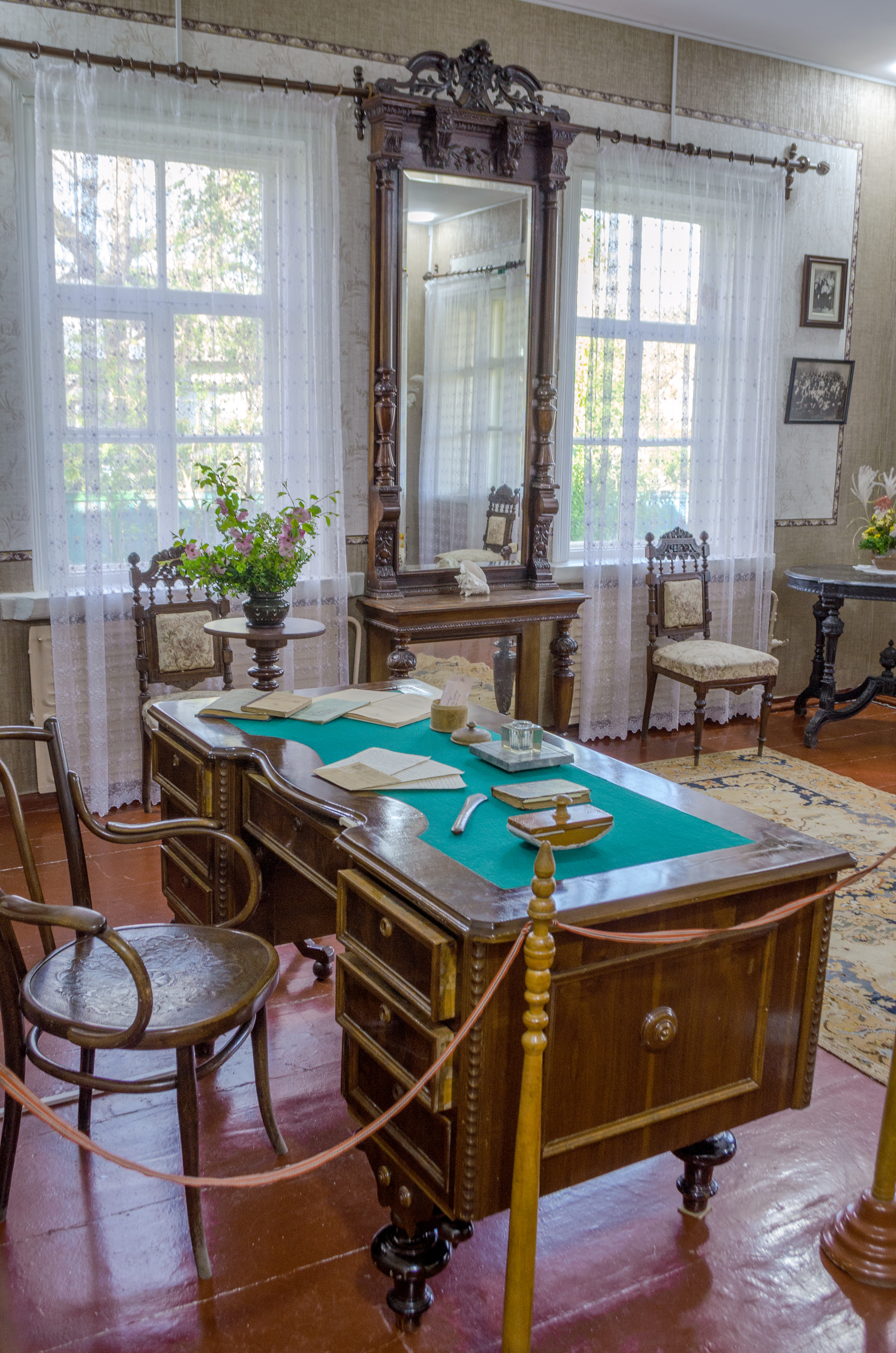

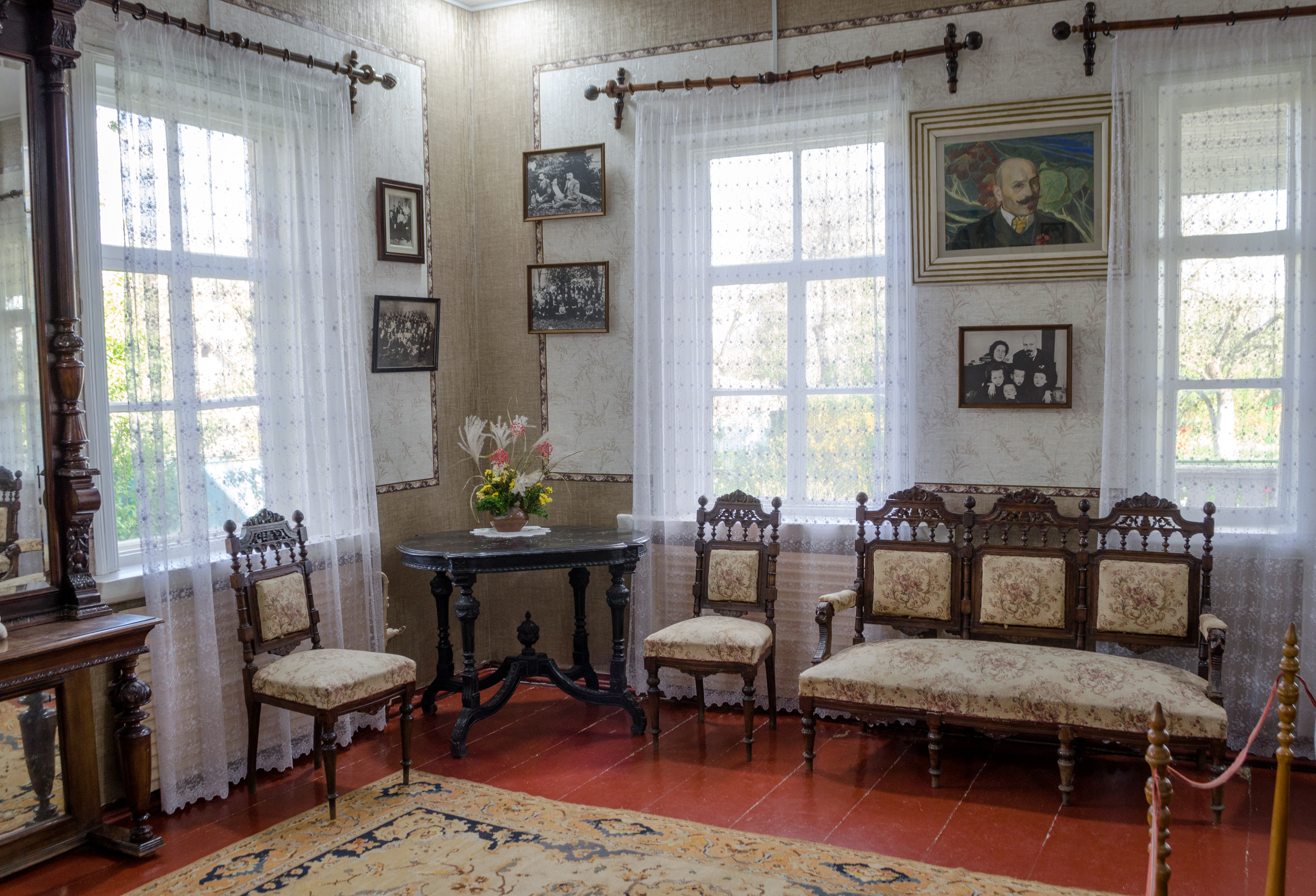

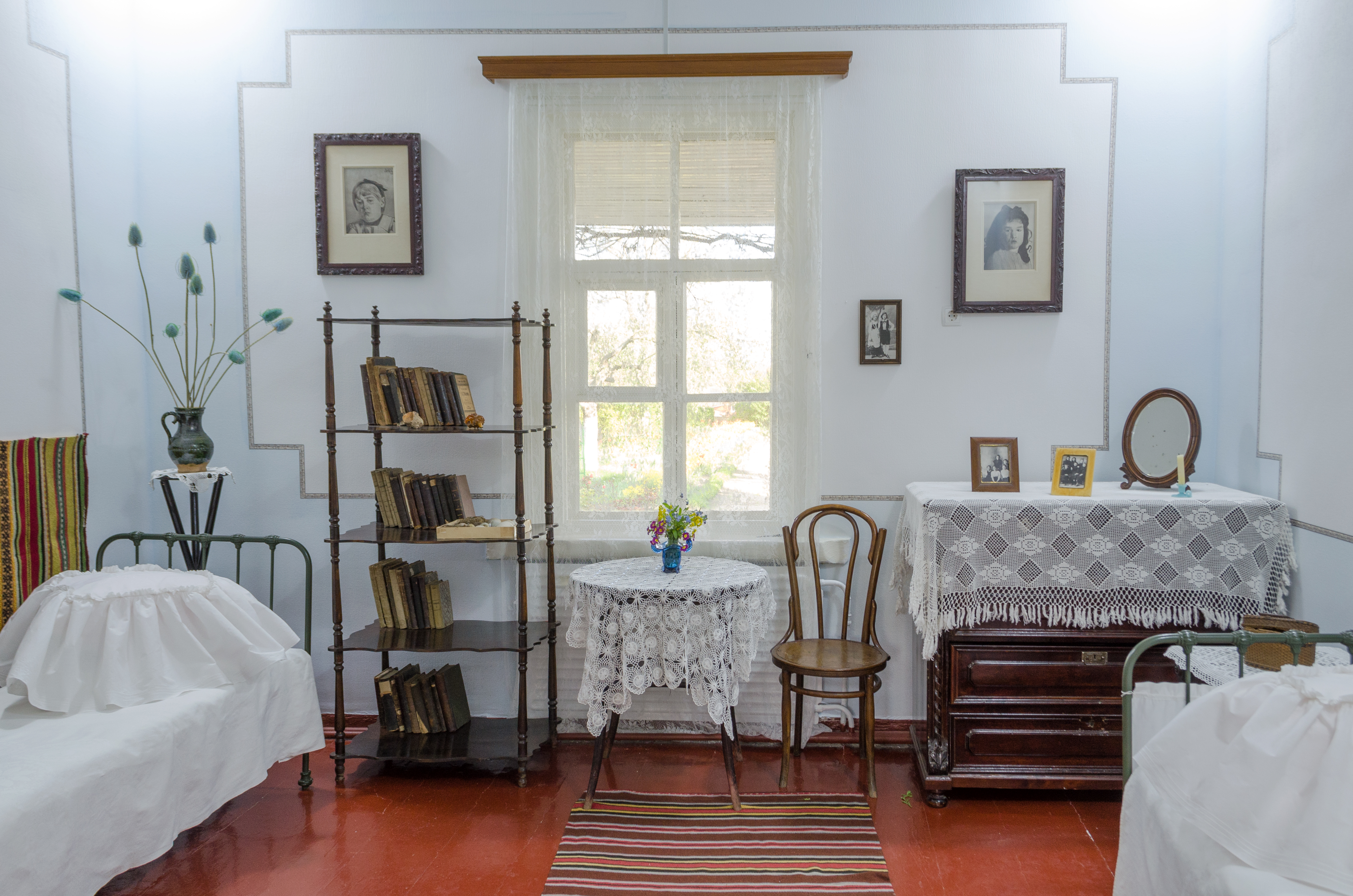

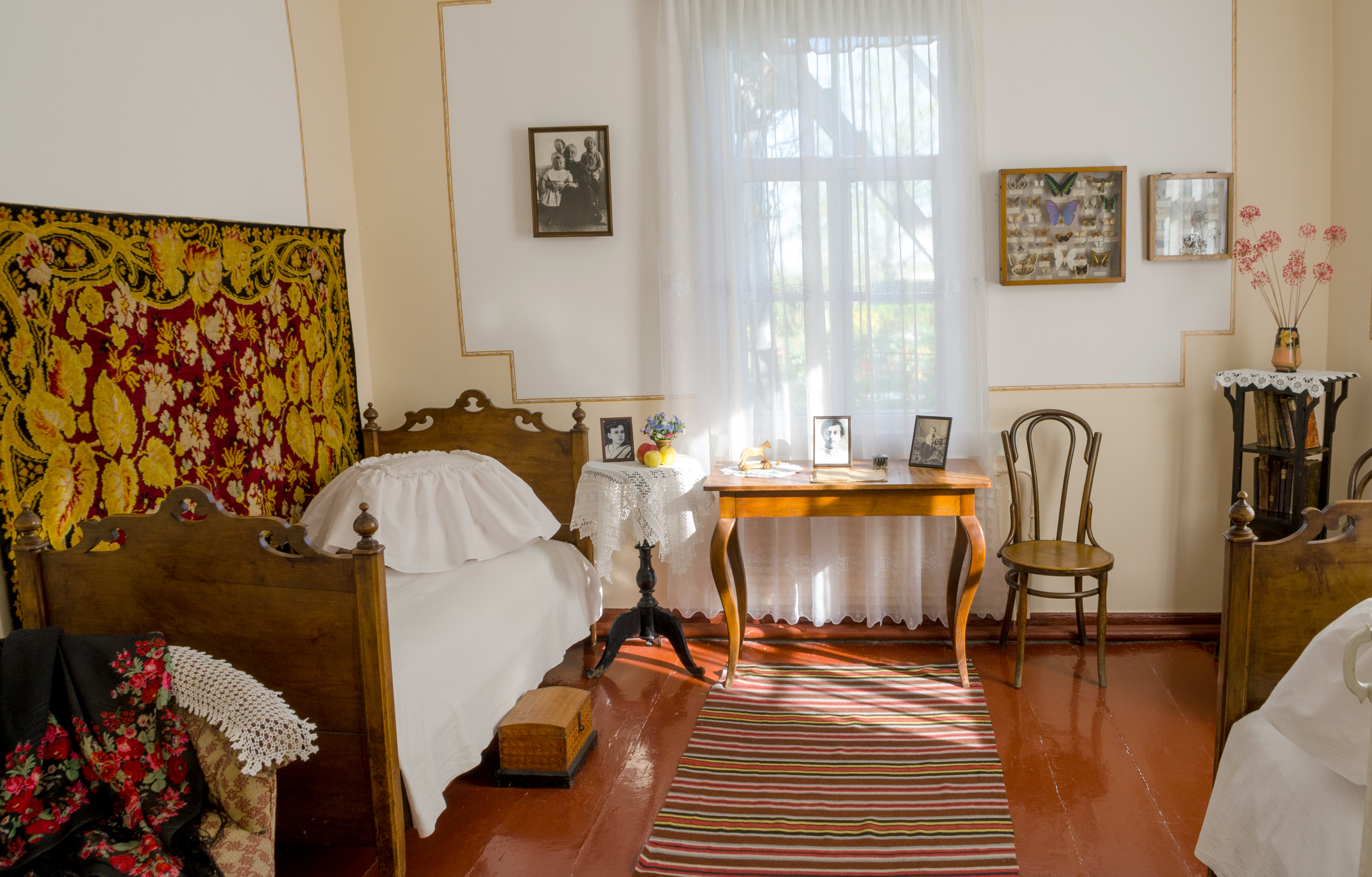

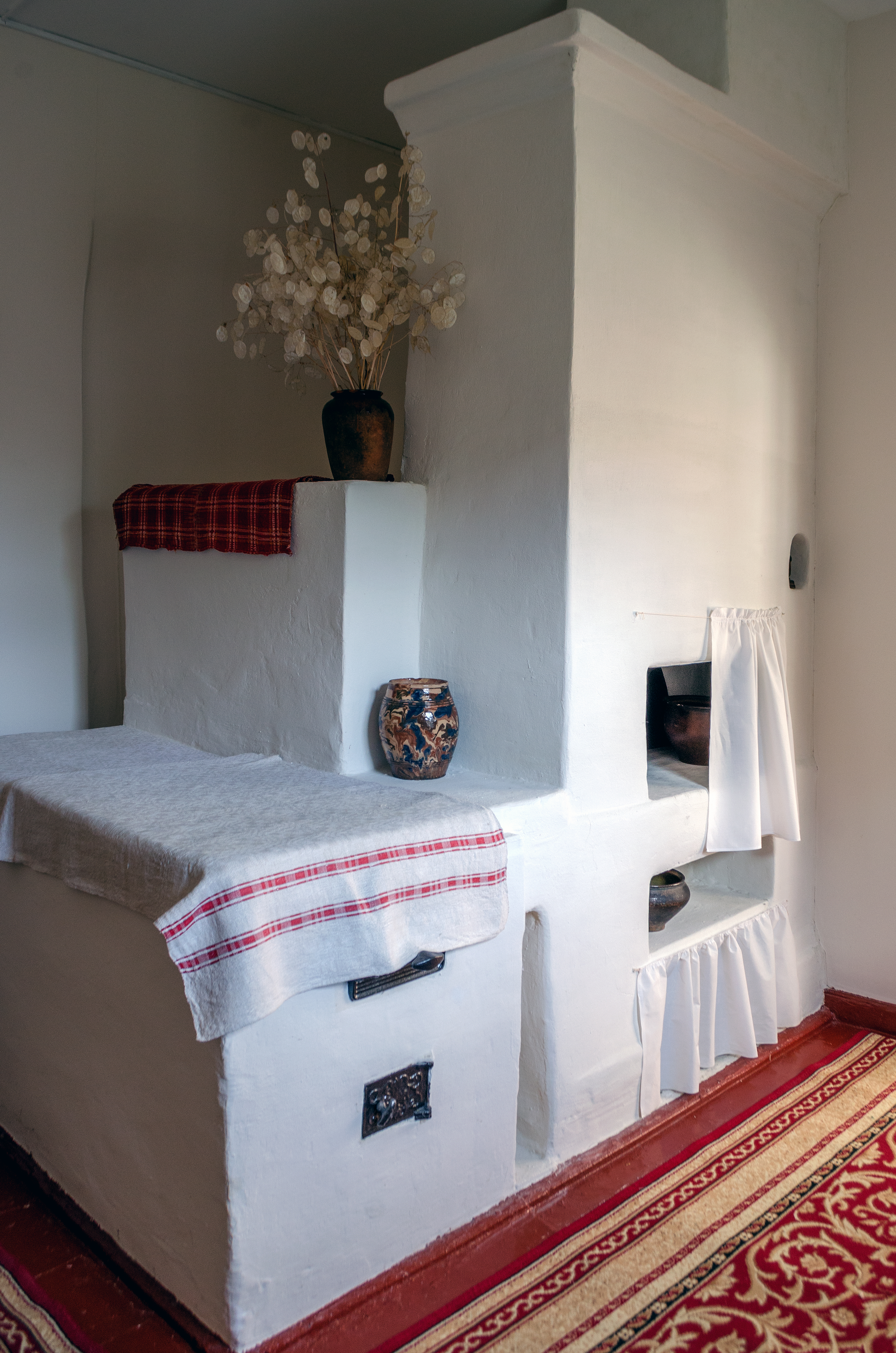

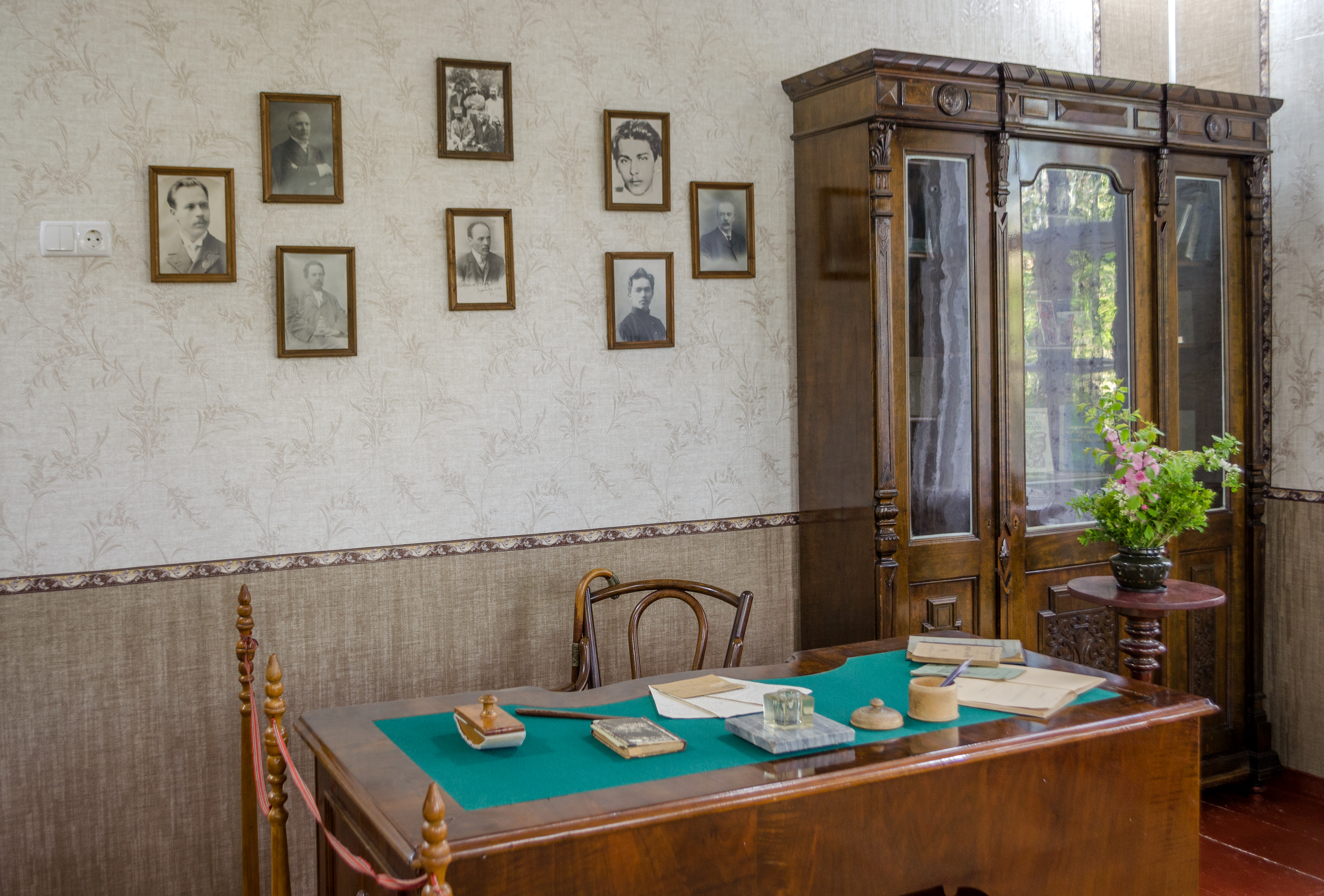

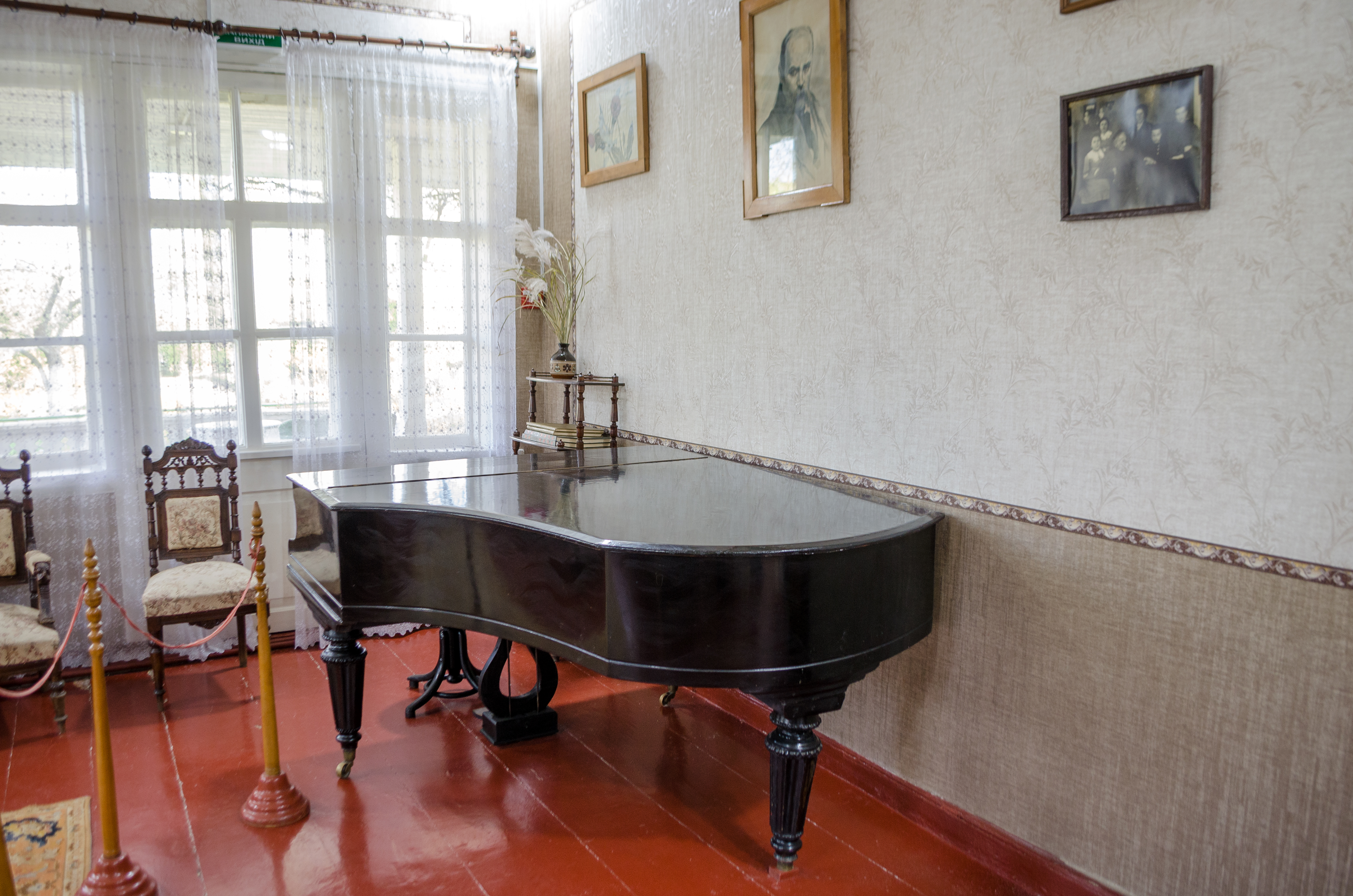

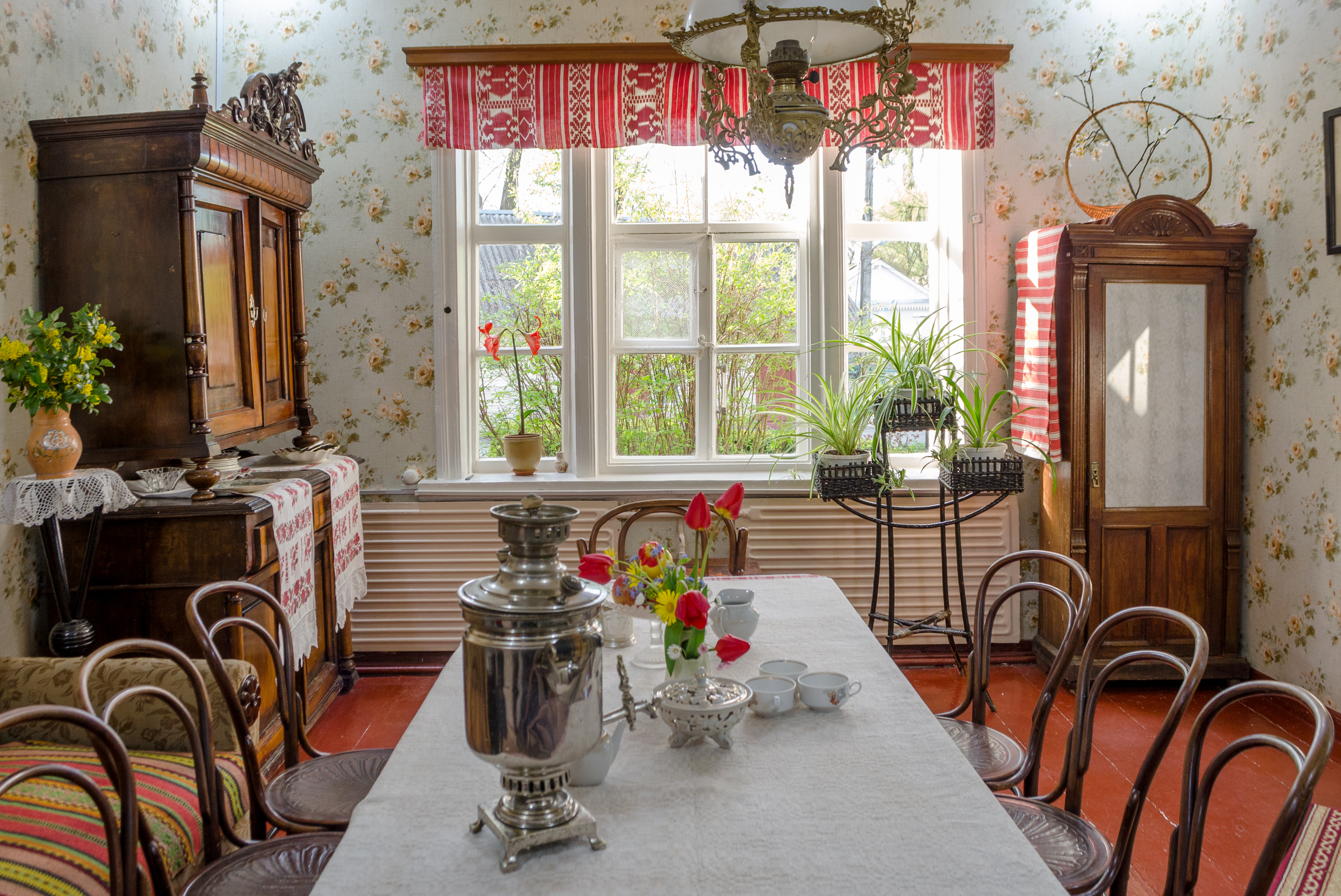

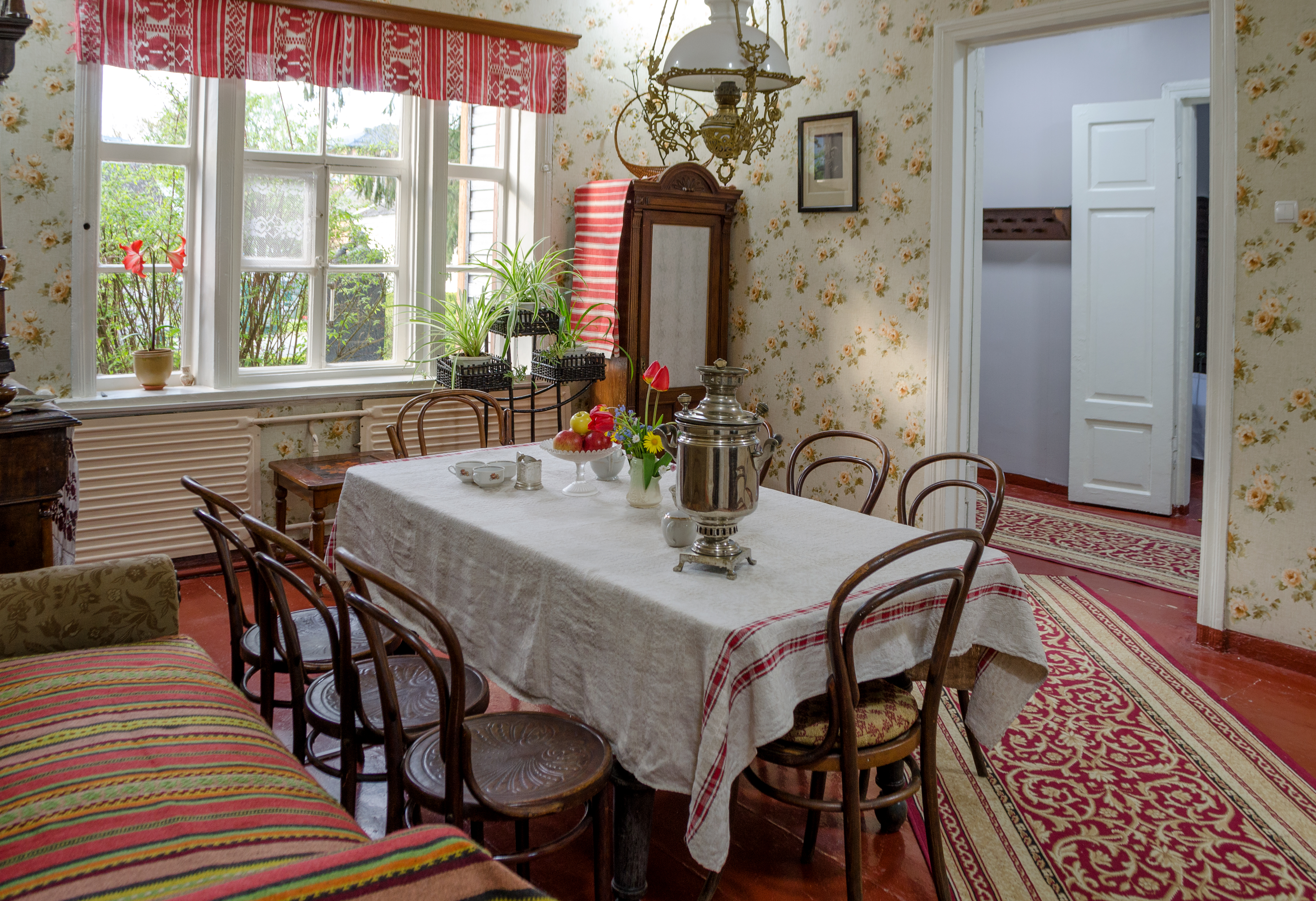

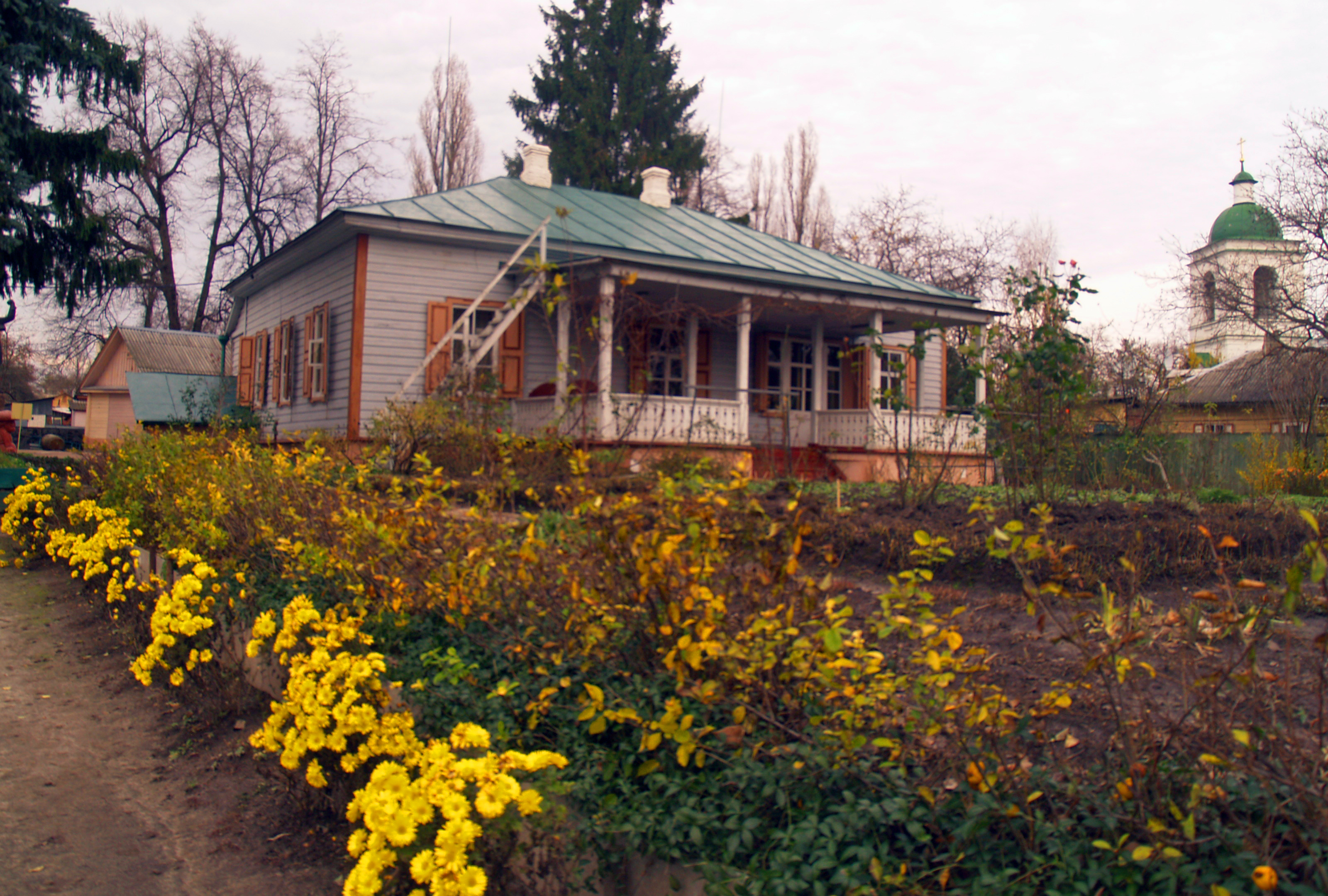

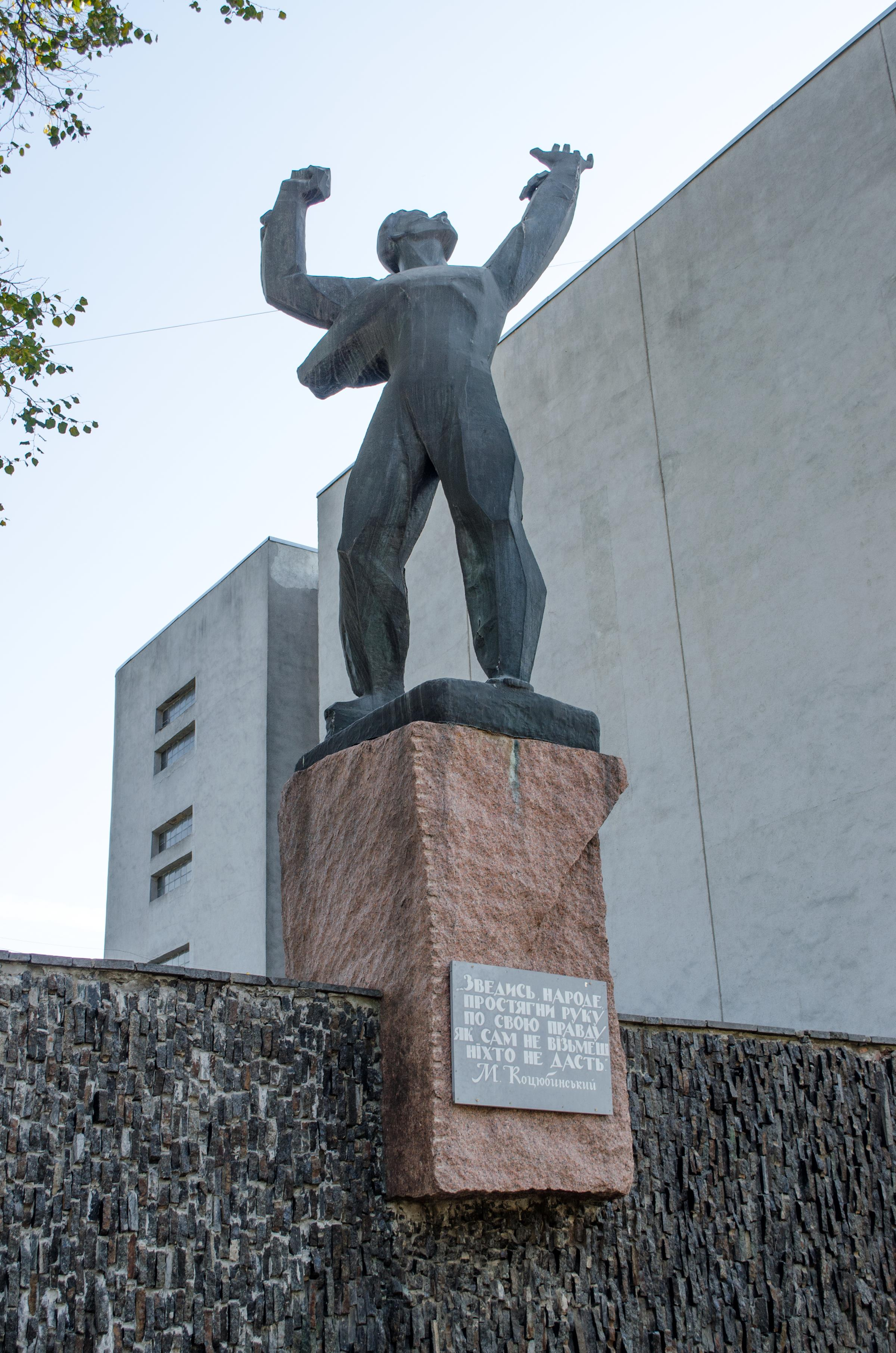

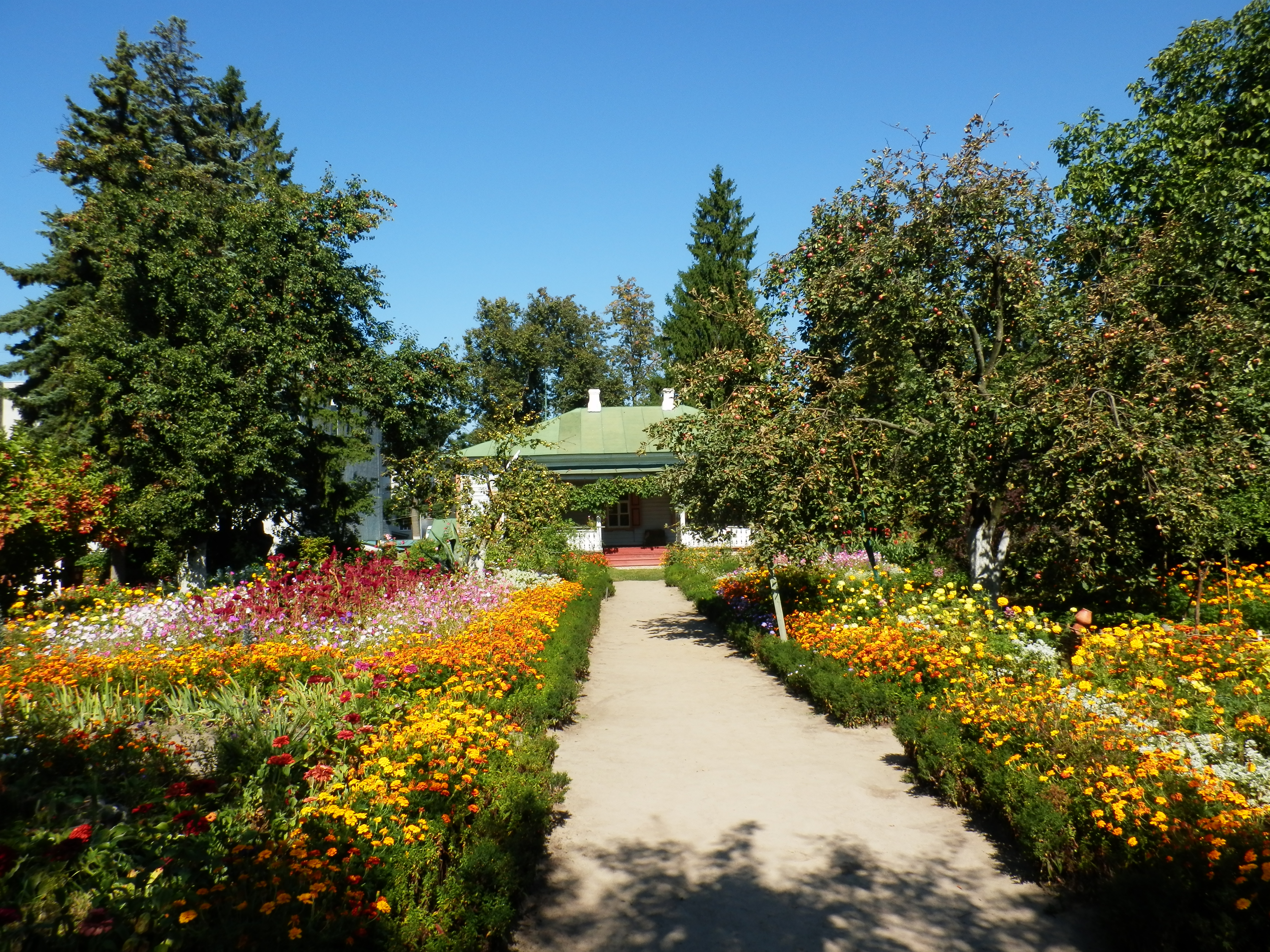

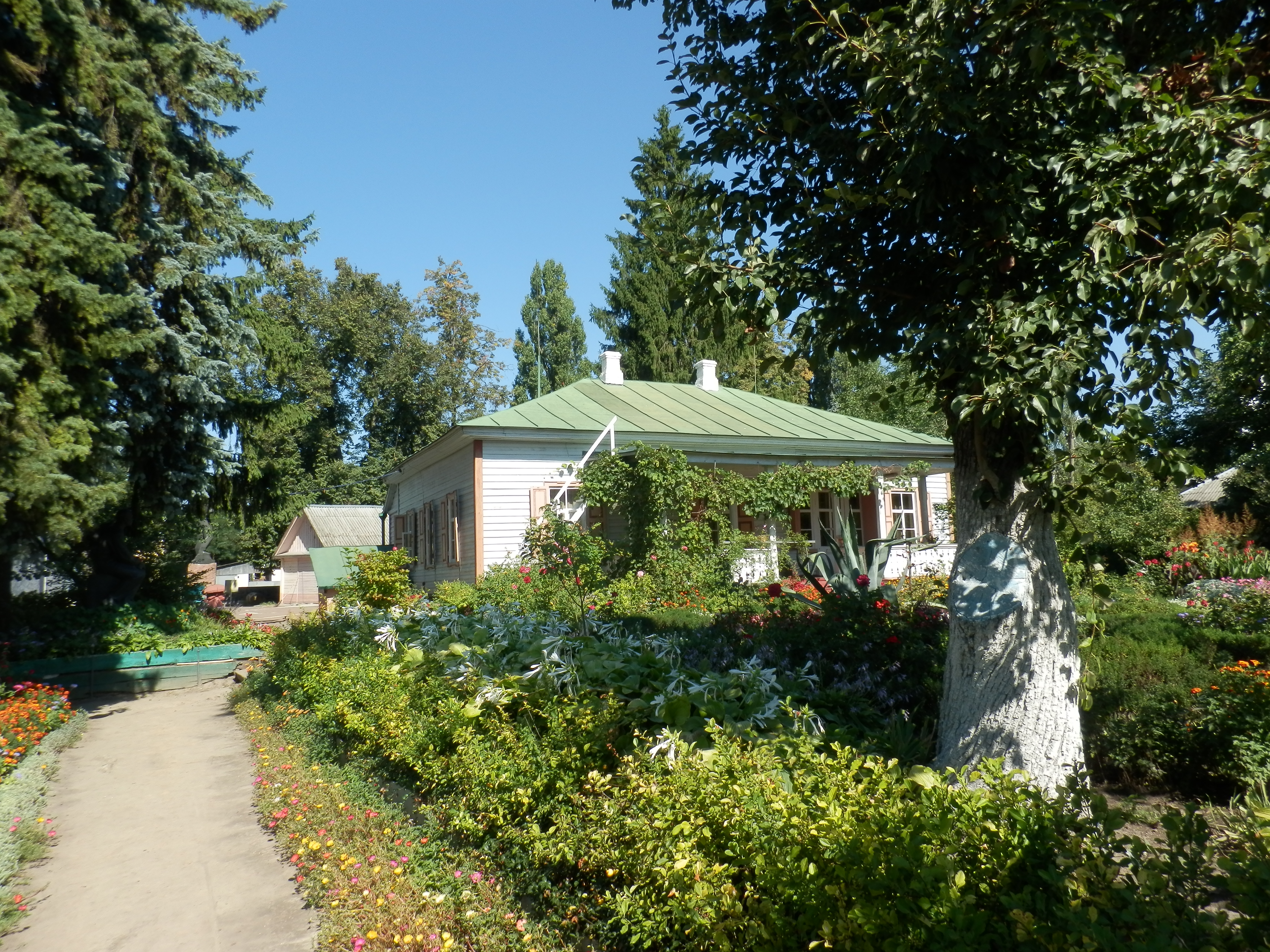

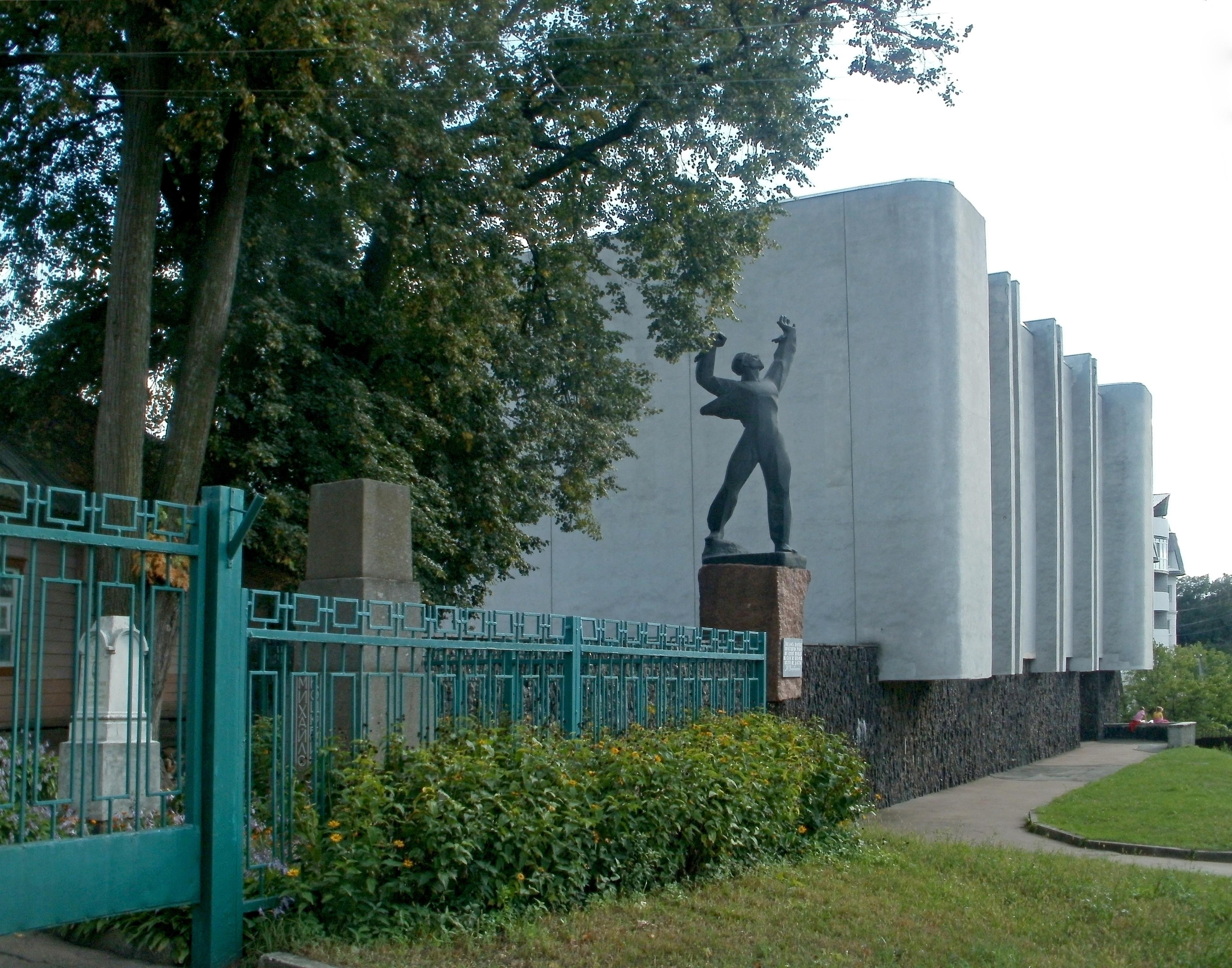

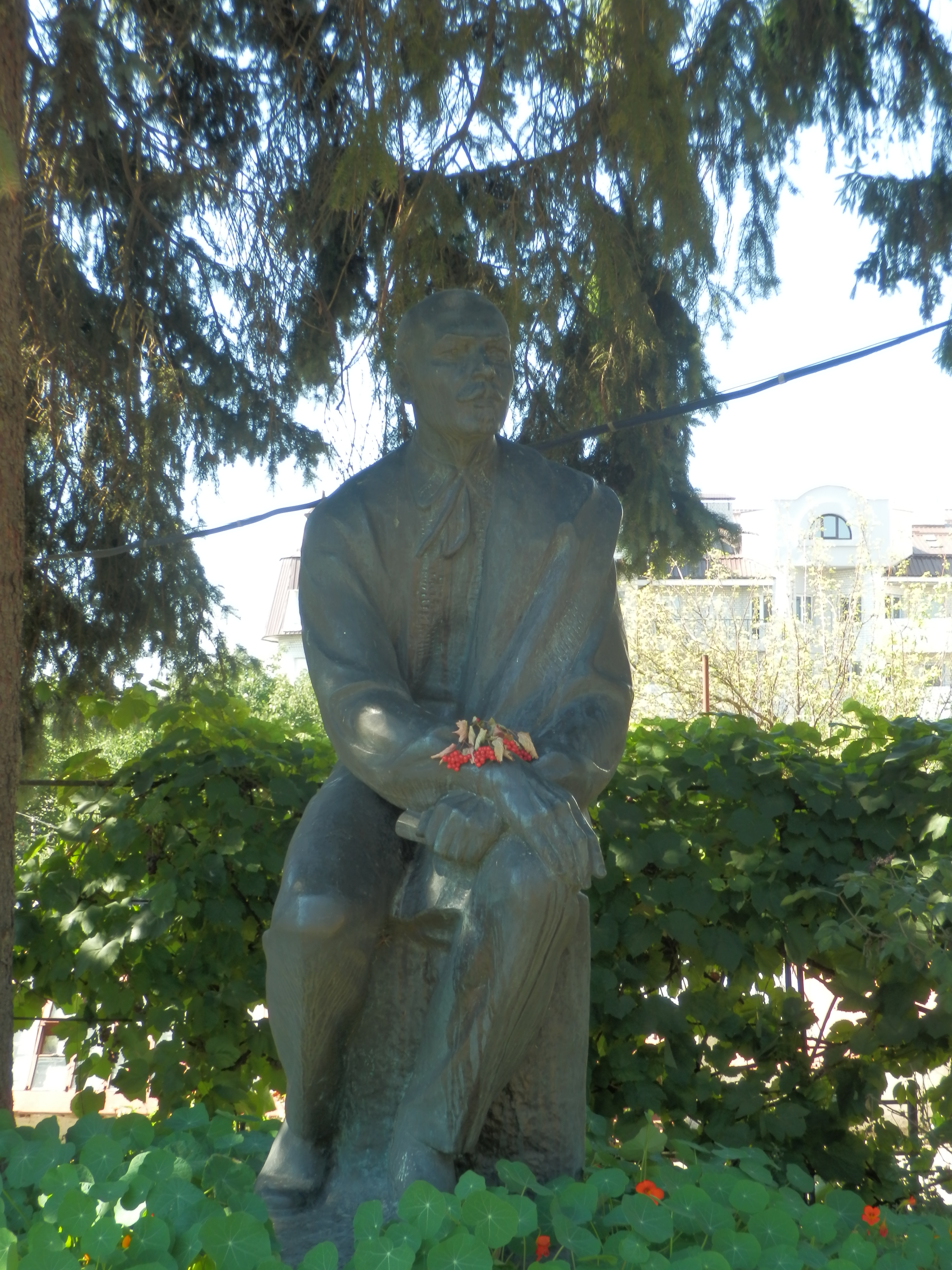

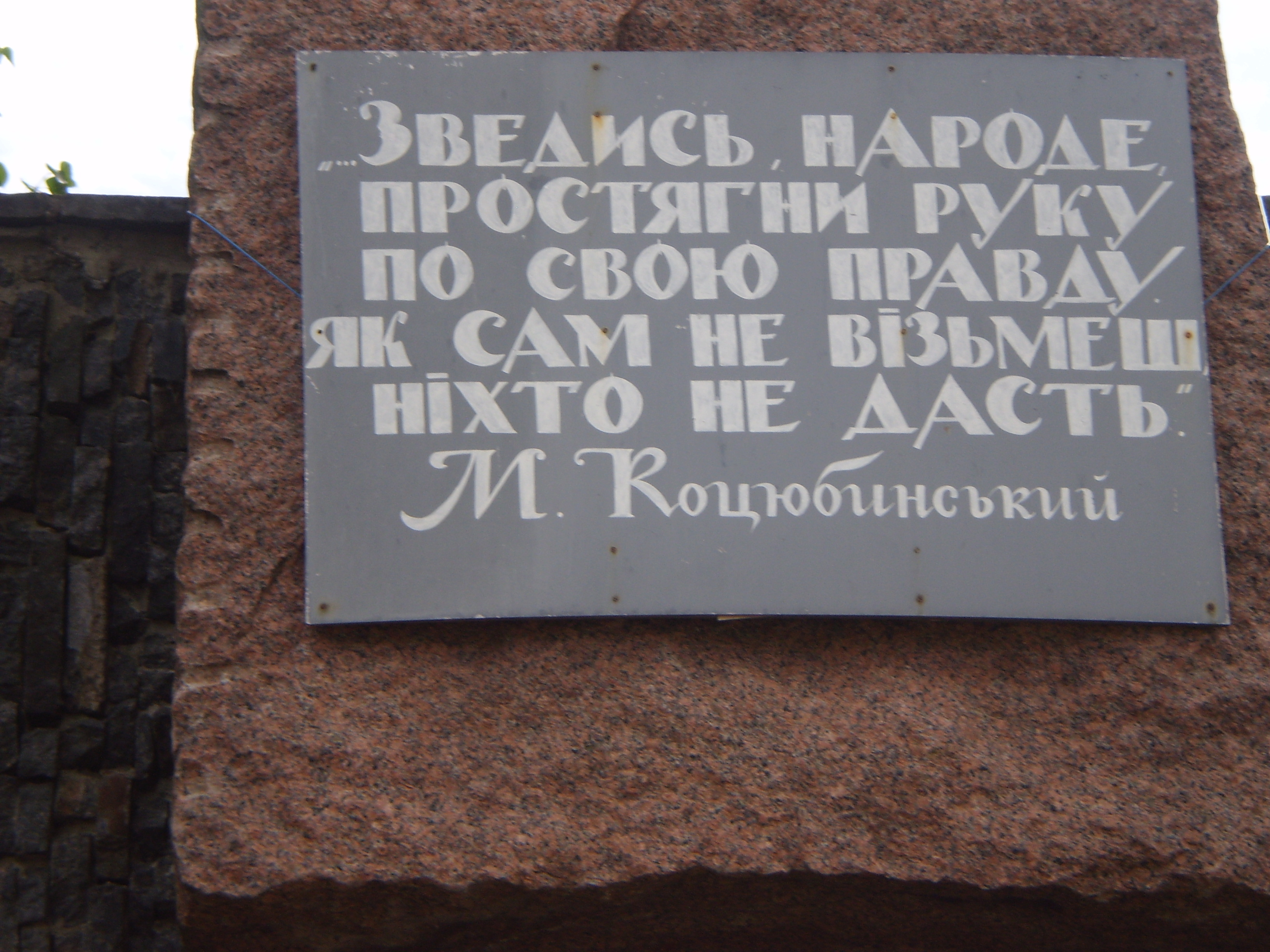
