= Rokyni =

Rural locality in Volyn Oblast, Ukraine

Rokyni Рокині
- Rural settlement
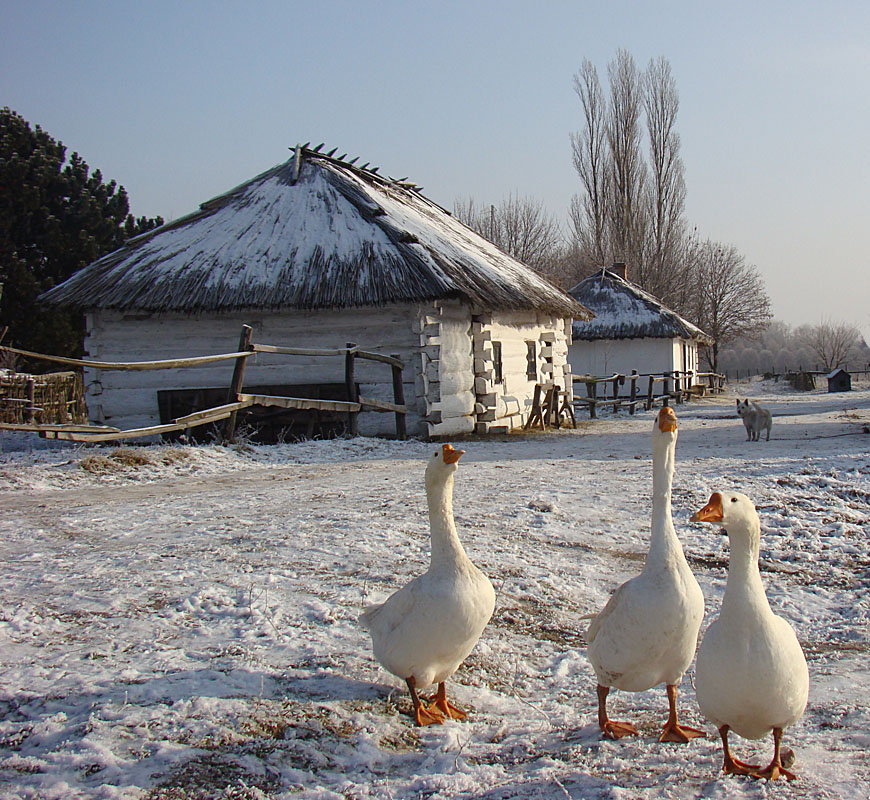

- Location in Volyn Oblast Location in Ukraine
- Coordinates: 50°49′53″N 25°15′58″E
- Country: Ukraine
- Oblast: Volyn Oblast
- Raion: Lutsk Raion
- Hromada: Lutsk urban hromada

Population (2022)
  - Total: 1,463
- Time zone: UTC+2 (EET)
  - Summer (DST): UTC+3 (EEST)

Rokyni (Ukrainian: Рокині; Polish: Rokinie) is a rural settlement in Lutsk Raion, Volyn Oblast, western Ukraine. It is located where the Serna joins the Styr, in the basin of the Dnieper. Population: 1,463 (2022 estimate).

== History ==
Until 26 January 2024, Rokyni was designated an urban-type settlement. On this day, a new law entered into force which abolished this status, and Rokyni became a rural settlement.

== Economy ==
=== Transportation ===
The closest railway station is in Lutsk.

The settlement is next to Highway M19, which connects Chernivtsi via Ternopil and Lutsk with Kovel.
