= Makarenko Museum (Bilopillya) =

Museum in Ukraine

Coordinates: 51.1486°N 34.3162°E

Музей Антона Макаренка
- Established: 1969
- Location: Bilopillya

The Anton S. Makarenko Museum in Bilopillya is a museum dedicated to the educator Anton Makarenko.

== History ==
The museum features the personal belongings of Anton Makarenko as well as furniture from the home of blacksmith Yakov Avramenko, where the Makarenko family lived in an apartment until 1901. In 1988, an exposition devoted to the history of Bilopillya and the region was created by local historian V.G. Kholenko. In 1992, an exposition devoted to the everyday lives of Ukrainians in the Slobozhanshchyna region was added to the museum. The exposition is stylized in the interior of a Ukrainian house from the late 19th century.

The museum, located in Anton Makarenko's hometown, was opened on 25 October 1969, at the initiative of community educators. Participants in the creation of the exposition were M.D. Illyashenko, O.A. Shcherbak, and V.G. Kholenko, who became the museum's keepers and its first tour guides.
