= Mariupol Museum of Local Lore =

Local history museum in Mariupol, Ukraine

- Маріупольський краєзнавчий музей
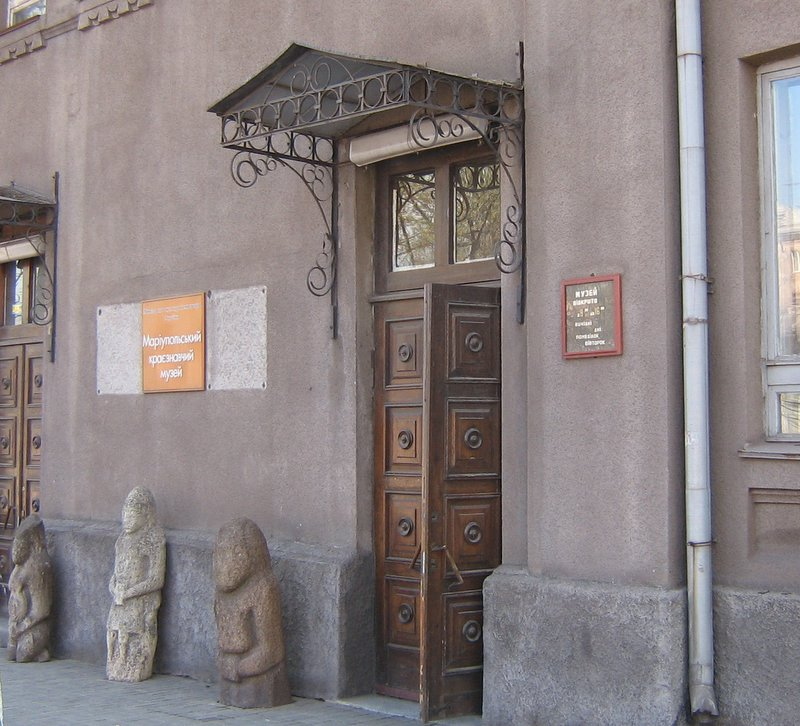
- Entrance of the museum
- Established: 6 February 1920
- Location: Heorhiivska Street 20, Mariupol, Donetsk Oblast, 87500, Ukraine
- Coordinates: 47°05′34″N 37°33′27″E
- Type: Local history

The Mariupol Museum of Local Lore is a museum of regional history in the city of Mariupol, Ukraine, at 20 Heorhiivska Street (Ukrainian: вулиця Георгіївська). The museum describes the natural conditions of the southern part of Donetsk Oblast and the history of the region from ancient times to the present. Its main activities of the museum are: Collection, exposition, research, scientific education and library. It was destroyed in 2022 during the Siege of Mariupol.

== History ==
The museum was founded on February 6, 1920, by the city department of public education of the Mariupol Revolutionary Committee. It was the first state museum in the Donetsk region.

The work of the museum's researchers contributed to the creation of nature reserves in the Azov region: Khomutovsky Steppe (1926), Bilosaray Spit (1927) and Stone Graves (1927).

In 1937, the Mariupol Museum received the status of a regional museum and was named "Donetsk Regional Museum of Local Lore".

In 1950, in connection with the creation of the regional museum of local lore in the city of Stalino (now Donetsk), the Mariupol museum was transferred to the category of museums of local importance.

On November 2, 1970, the "AA Zhdanov Memorial House Museum" was opened, a branch of the then "Zhdanov Museum of Local Lore". Exposition departments were: nature, history of the pre-Soviet period, history of the Soviet period, the modern period.

In 1992, the "Museum of Folk Life" and the "National Museum of the History and Ethnography of the Greeks" of the Azov Sea Region in the village of Sartana became a branch.

In 2022, the museum was almost entirely destroyed and burned down by Russian bombing during the Siege of Mariupol.

== Exhibitions ==
The museum has seven exhibition halls and a scientific library which holds around 17,000 books. The museum's funds contain about 53,000 exhibits, including items of tangible nature, pictorial, written (handwritten and printed), numismatic, archaeological, photographic, natural and others.

The permanent exhibition illustrates the natural conditions of the southern part of Donetsk Oblast and its history, from ancient times to the present day. The diversity of flora and fauna of the region is highlighted, which has undergone significant changes under the influence of anthropogenic factors of civilization.

From 1995 to 2001, the exposition of the history of the Soviet period and partially the history of the pre-Soviet period were reorganized and extended. The exposition of the pre-Soviet period reflects the process of settlement of the region from ancient times, as well as the development of virgin lands of Azov by Ukrainians, Greeks, Germans, Mennonites, Jews, Cossacks of the Azov Army, founding villages, towns, crafts, trade, cultural heritage. The exposition of the Soviet period focuses on household items, including models and original exhibits, showing the process of transformation of Mariupol into the largest industrial center of southern Ukraine.

In 2001, on the tenth anniversary of Ukraine's independence, a new permanent exhibition "The City of Mariupol for the Years of Ukraine's Independence" was opened. It shows Mariupol's engagement in the areas of production and in education, culture and art.

The museum preserves a number of rarities and interesting finds from the Azov region. Of special value are the decree of Catherine II to Greek Christians, initiating their resettlement from the Crimean Khanate from 1778 to 1780 to the North Pryazovia, including the village of Sartana, the Shroud of 1760, and the Gospel of 1811. Photos and postcards trace the history of the city of Mariupol and its natives from the 1870s to the present.

The basis of the archaeological collection are materials from unique monuments – the Amvrosiivka site, the Neolithic burial ground of Mariupol, tools, signs of power, jewelry, a collection of stone statues (“stone women”) of ancient and medieval nomads. This includes a bronze buckle in the form of an elk's head, an example of the "Scythian animal" style, bronze mirrors of oriental production from the Golden Horde burial ground.

== Selected exhibits ==
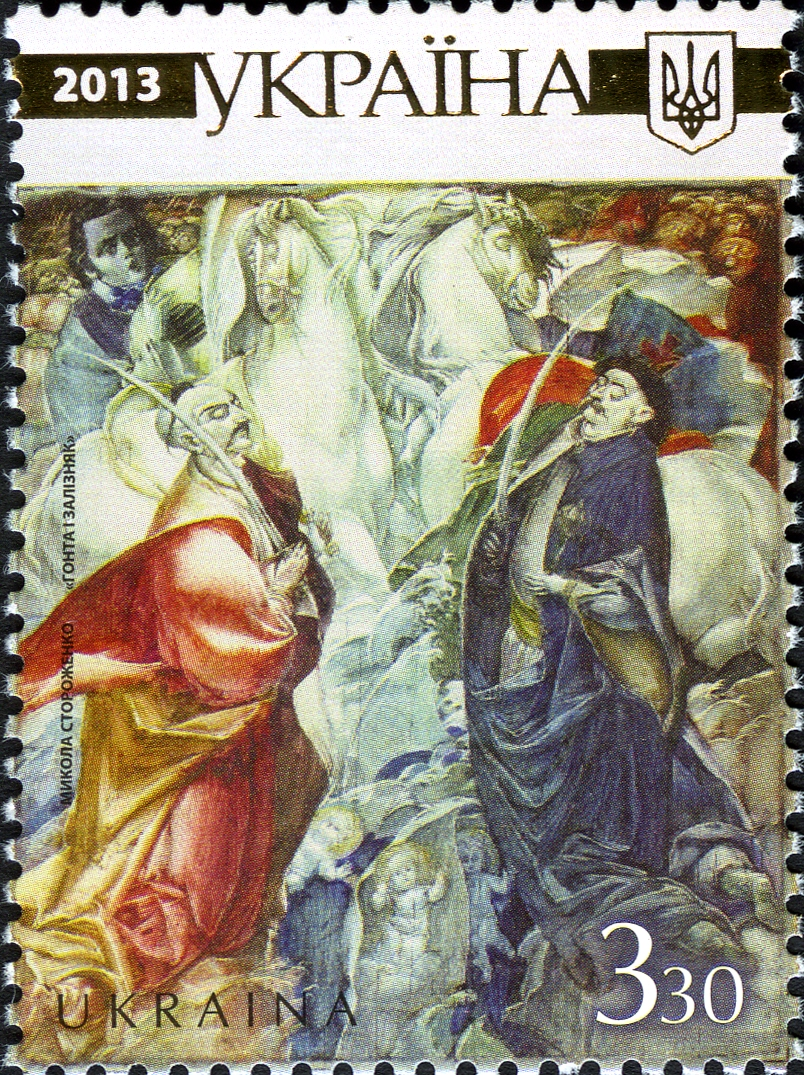
Storozhenko Mykola Andriyovych, Gonta and Zalizniak stamp, 2013

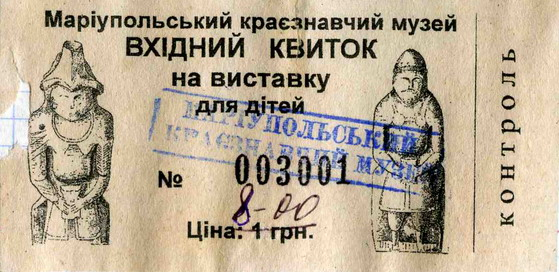
Museum entry ticket 2010

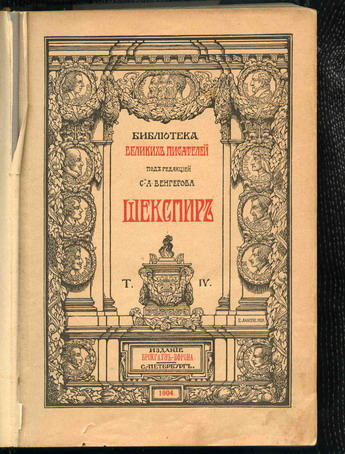
Shakespeare 1904 ed., published by Brockhaus-Efron, St. Petersburg

Album published by Fratelli Fabbri Editori Milano, 1963

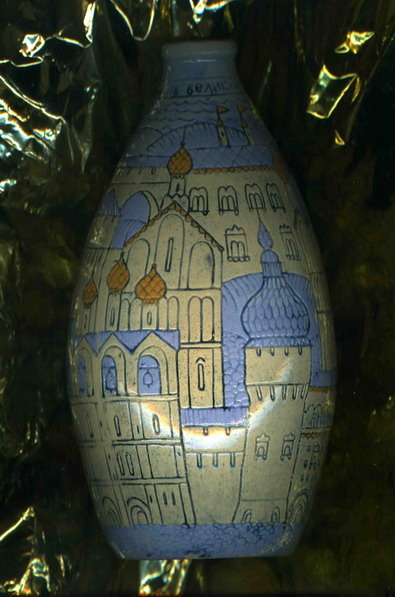
Vase Rostov Great Faience of the 20th century

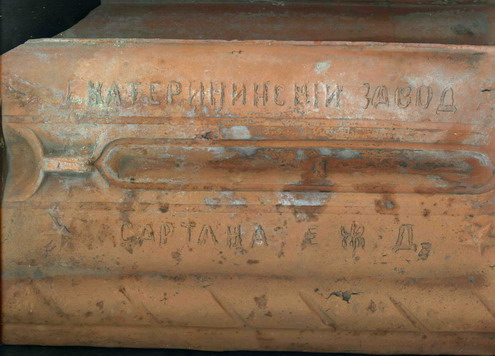
Catherine Ceramic Factory, Sartana, early 20th century

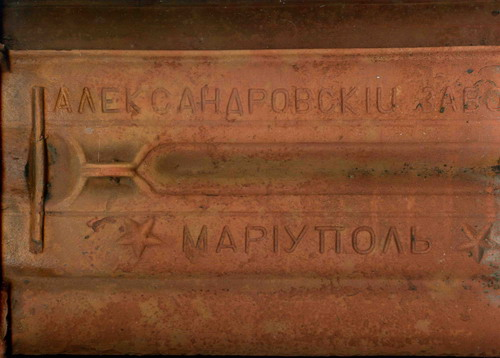
Mariupol. Alexander Ceramic Factory. Early 20th century

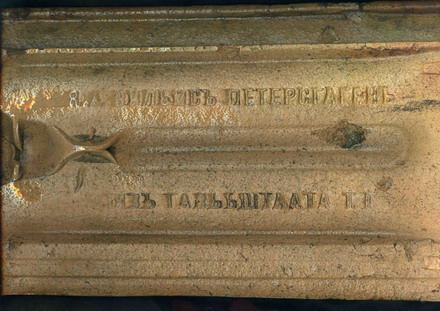
Alexander Ceramic Factory. Early 20th century. VA Wilms Petershagen (incomprehensible below), tiles of the early 20th century. Mariupol

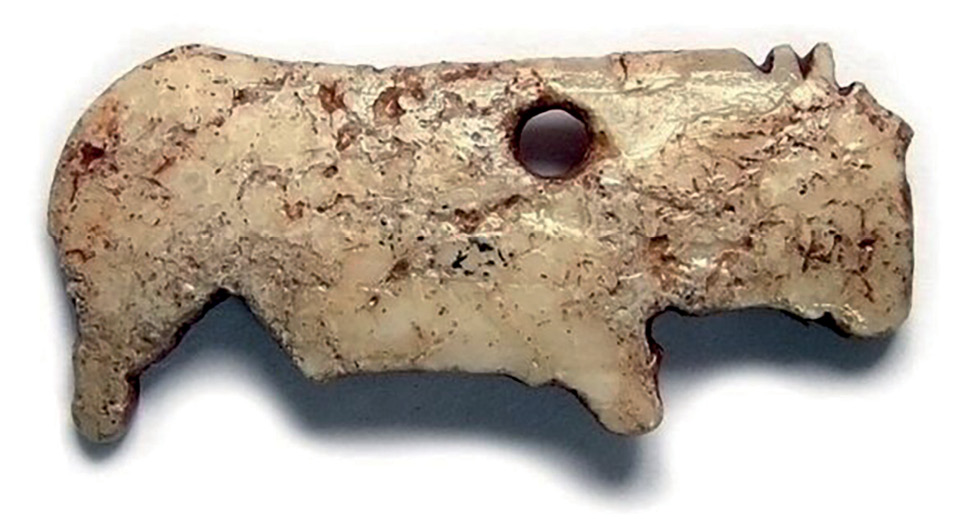
Mariupol Bull Figurine, 6000 BC, looted during the Siege of Mariupol in 2022

== Numismatic collection ==
The numismatic collection of the museum contains coins of the Roman Empire, Byzantium, ancient cities of the Northern Black Sea region, the Muscovy, the Russian Empire, the Commonwealth, Austria-Hungary, the USSR, and awards of the Russian Empire and the USSR.

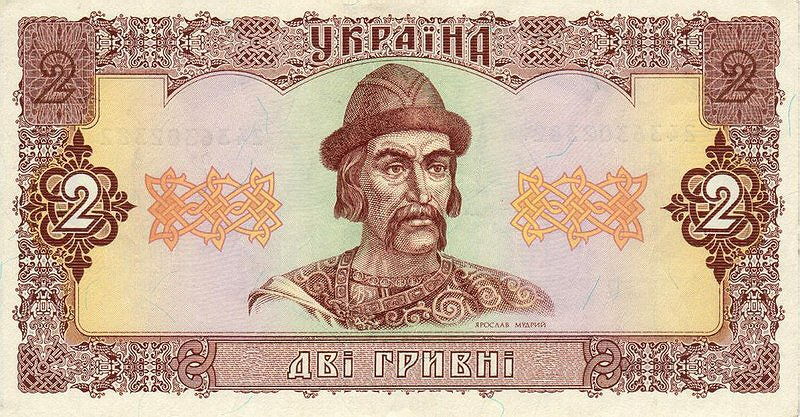
Two Hryvnias, 1992 edition

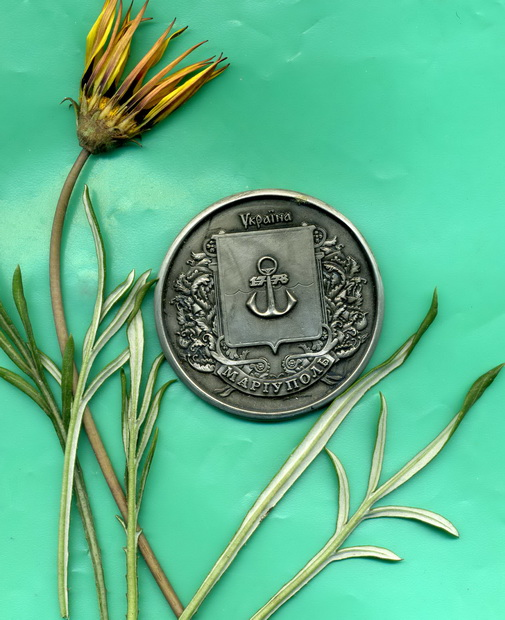
Decorative medal in honor of Mariupol

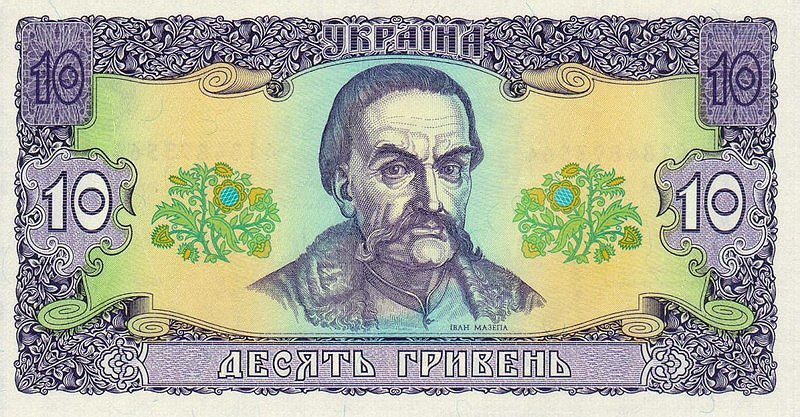
10 Hryvniaa banknote with the image of I. C. Mazepa (the oldest version, subject to gradual withdrawal from circulation)

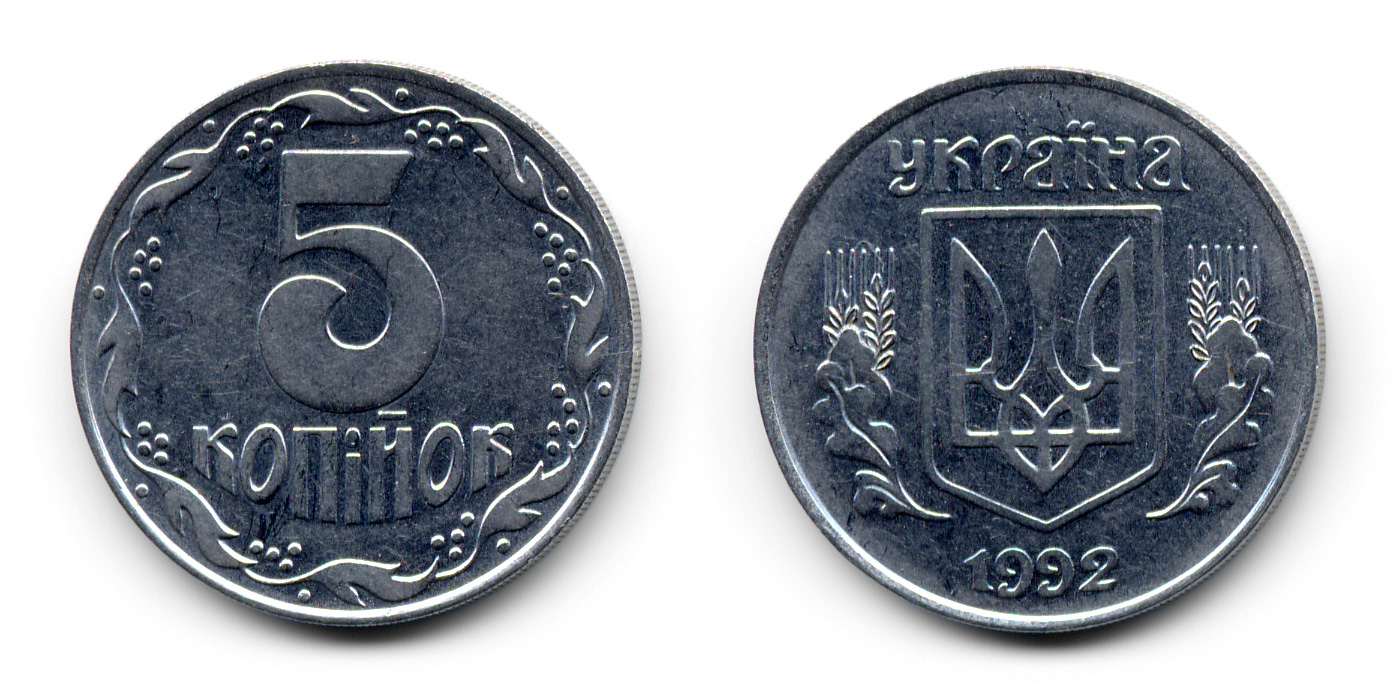
Five Kopeck of Ukraine 1992, nickel

== Paintings ==
The museum exhibits works by A.I. Kuindzhi "Red Sunset", "Autumn. Crimea", "Elbrus"; I. K. Aivazovsky "Off the coast of the Caucasus"; MM. Dubovsky "Night on the Baltic Sea", "Sea"; drawings by V.V. Vereshchagin during the Russian-Turkish war of 1877–1878, Ukrainian artists T.N. Yablonskaya 'Three Mounds'. MP. Glushchenko "The Lake", S.F. Shishko "Morning in the Forest", "April. Goloseevo", A. M. Gritsay, M. G. Deregus and many other works.

== Branches of the museum ==
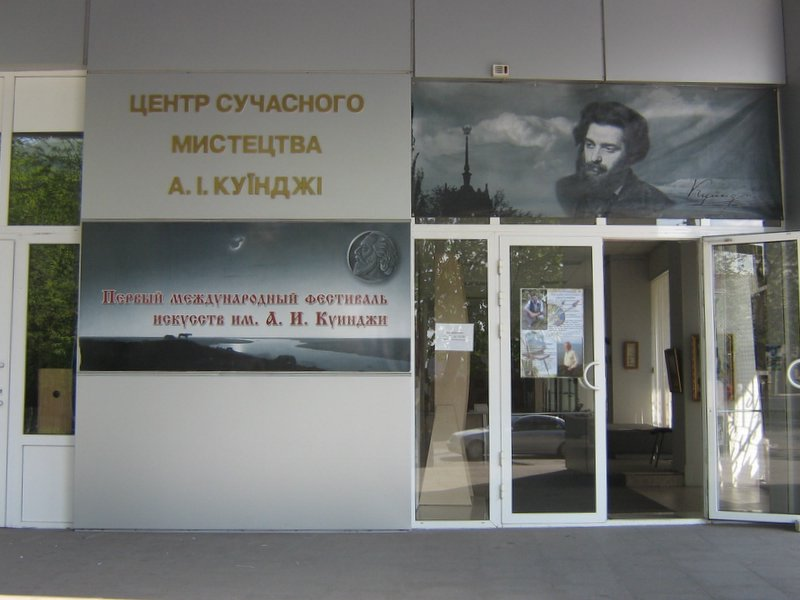
Kuindzhi Contemporary Center

Museum of Folk Life (55 Heorhiivska Street) Opened in 1989, this branch highlights the peculiarities of life of people of different nationalities who inhabited the territory of the Azov region in the late 18th century.

Kuindzhi Center for Contemporary Art and Culture (25 Metallurhiv Avenue) Opened in 2004, this branch hosts permanent art exhibitions and various temporary exhibitions every year, featuring art ranging from expressionism to abstraction, and conducts scientific and educational activities.

Museum of the History and Ethnography of the Greeks of the Azov Region (Sartana, 37a General Kurkchi Street) A branch since 1992, this museum exhibits the history of the migration of Greek Christians from the Crimean Khanate in the Azov region from 1778 to 1780, the establishment of villages and economic development of the settlement of the Greek Diaspora to the present.

Kuindzhi Art Museum (58 Heorhiivska Street) Open for visitors since October 30, 2010, this branch is located in an Art Nouveau mansion built in 1902 as a wedding gift to Valentina Gadzinova, the wife of the founder of the real school Vasily Hyatsintov. The museum displays paintings, furniture, documents, letters, photographs, and medal art. While dedicated to the 19th-century artist Arkhip Kuindzhi, the museum's collection also includes works by other Ukrainian painters. The museum was damaged by an airstrike on March 21, 2022, during the Siege of Mariupol. The three original works by Kuindzhi were not in the museum at the time, but works by other artists were, for example works by Ivan Aivazovsky, a contemporary of Kuindzhi.

== See also ==
- Former head of the museum Fenenko Mykola Vasyliovych
- List of museums in Ukraine
- Museum of the Alexander Men's Gymnasium
