= Museum of Folk Life =

Ethnographic museum in Mariupol, Ukraine

- Музей народного побуту
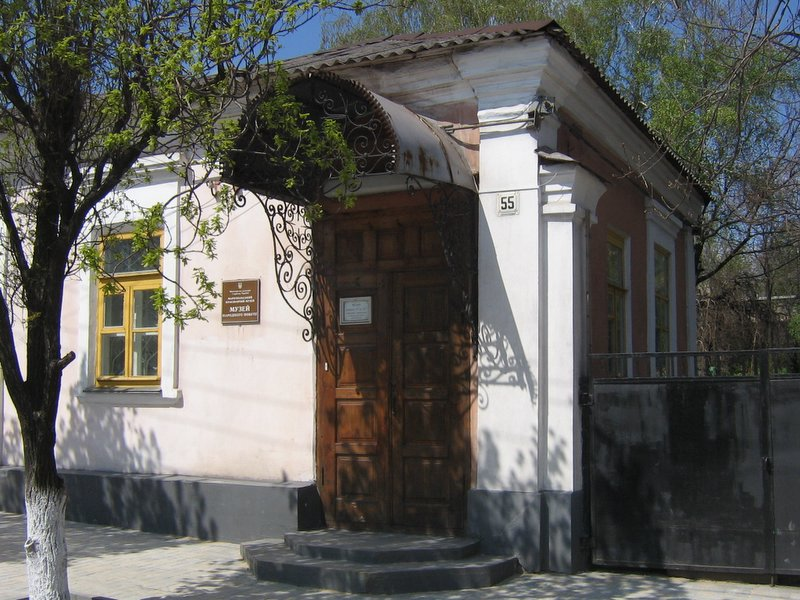
- Museum of Folk Life
- Established: 1989
- Location: Georgievskaya Street 55, Mariupol, Donetsk Oblast 87500, Ukraine
- Coordinates: 47°05′38″N 37°33′00″E
- Type: Local history

The Museum of Folk Life is located at Heorhiivska Street 55 (Ukrainian: вулиця Георгіївська), Mariupol, Ukraine. It displays the peculiarities of everyday life of representatives of different nationalities who inhabited the Azov region between the 18th and the beginning of the 20th century. The exposition is based on ethnography and the most widely represented cultures were those of Ukrainians and Greeks.

== History ==
The museum was opened in 1989 as a branch of the Mariupol Museum of Local Lore through the reorganization of the museum.

During the construction of Azovstal in the 1930s, a Cossack dugout was found in Mariupol. Exhibits, including parts of dishes, a heel, ceramic pipes, and a spearhead were found, indicating that Zaporizhzhia Cossacks lived there. Some of the exhibits are presented in the Museum of Folk Life.

The museum is located in the building which, since 1969, had contained the house-museum of A. Zhdanov.

Between 1995 and 2001, the museum received a new exposition regarding the pre-Soviet era through reorganisation of Mariupol Museum of Local Lore.

== Exhibits ==
The displays include over 5,000 exhibits and reveals the features of a typical household and life of the time from the 18th to the beginning of the 20th century.

Presented objects include tools, household items, including clothing, fabrics, jewelry, utensils, furniture of Ukrainians, Russians, Greeks, Jews and Germans. An open-air complex, including a mill, smithy, and pottery workshop, was built in the yard.

The section "Life and culture of the Jewish population" also elaborates on the celebration of Hanukkah.

Most substantial is the collection that reflects the culture of the Greeks who arrived at the end of the 18th century from the Crimean khanate. It contains carpets, woven wall decorations ("tohma"), embroidered shirts (national costumes) and handkerchiefs used in weddings, women's hats ("periphtar"), as well as jewelry, belts, metal dishes, Easter eggs, and more.

== See also ==
- List of ethnographic museums
