= Museum of the History and Ethnography of the Greeks of the Azov Region =

Museum near Mariupol, Ukraine

Museum of History and Ethnography of the Greeks of the Azov Region
- Музей історії греків Приазов'я
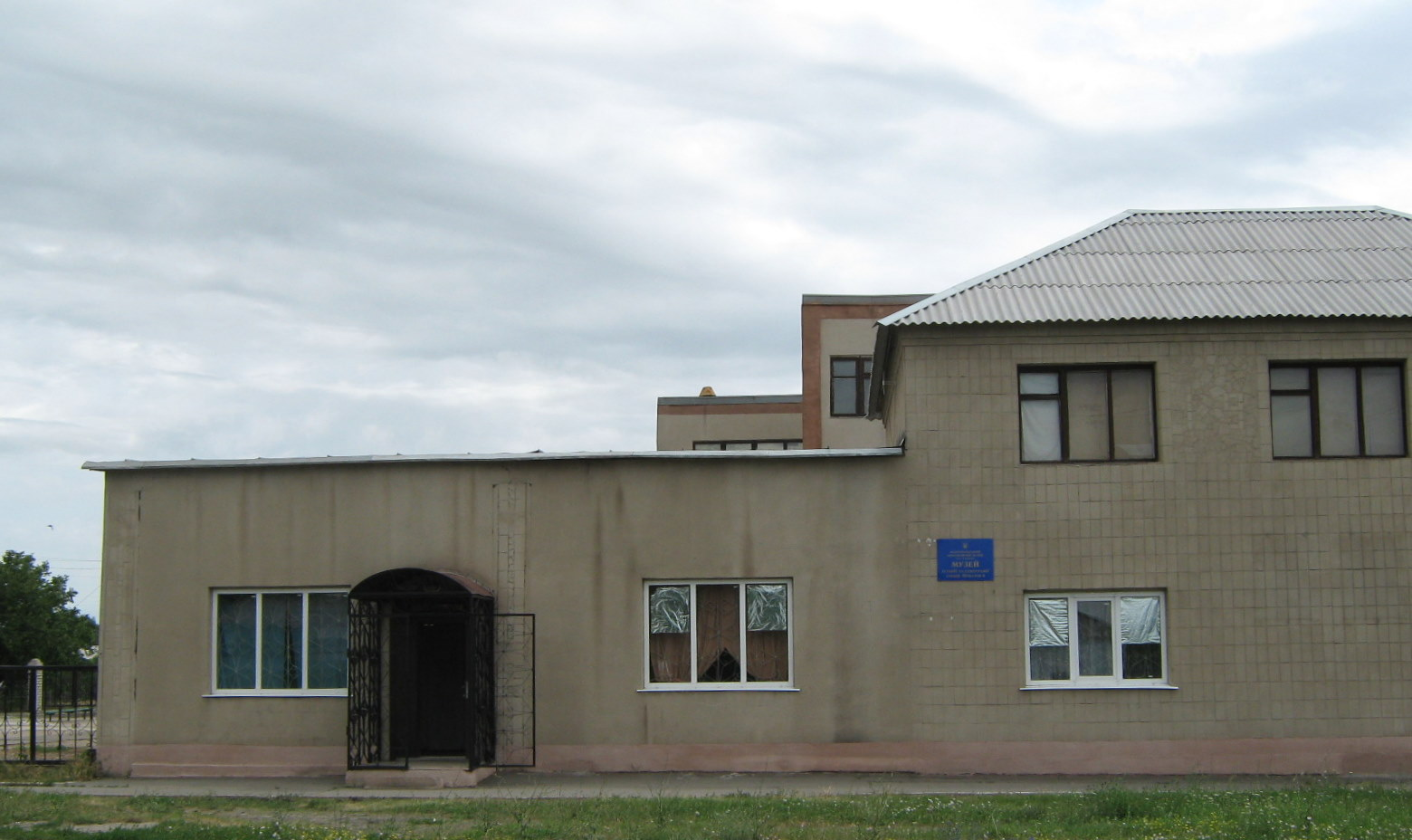
- Museum of History and Ethnography of the Greeks of the Azov Sea Region
- Established: 1987
- Location: Ukraine General Kurkchi Street 37A, Sartana, Donetsk Oblast 87592, Ukraine; Ukrainian: вулиця Генерала Куркчи, 37А, Сартана, Донецька область
- Coordinates: 47°10′31″N 37°41′39″E
- Type: Ethnographic museum
- Founder: Ivan A. Papush

The Museum of History and Ethnography of the Greeks of the Azov Region is a branch of the Mariupol Museum of Local Lore located in the rural settlement of Sartana near Mariupol, Ukraine.

== History ==
The Museum was founded in 1987 by Ivan A. Papush on a voluntary basis and later acquired the status of a national museum.

In 1992, the museum became a branch of the Mariupol Museum of Local Lore.

In 1997, the museum received its modern name Museum of History and Ethnography of the Greeks of the Azov Region.

== Exposition ==
More than 3,000 exhibits are presented in the museum on two floors in six halls. Its exposition reflects the process of resettlement of Greeks from the Crimean Khanate to the Azov Region in the second half of the 18th century, the establishment of Greek settlements, local territories and economic activity (agriculture, livestock, trade, crafts). It illustrates the preservation of cultural traditions, housing, clothing, jewelry, rituals and holidays, and the development of the Greek diaspora in the Azov Region.

The exhibition History of the Greeks of the Azov Sea explains events that took place in Ukraine and Mariupol. It includes the October Revolution and the civil war in the region, the coming to power of the Soviets, the famine of the 1920s and 1930s and political repression. Also presented are events that end the Soviet era and illustrate the emergence of Ukraine on the political map, as well as the achievements of the Azov region today.

Collections of decorative and applied art are also on display, and attention is paid to the cuisine of the Azov Greeks.

Cultural activities supplement the visual displays, including the staging of a local wedding ceremony, a master class introducing traditional Greek costumes, cooking of national cuisine, events of ethnic music and theatrical performances.

The museum takes part in representations at local exhibitions, for example:

- History of the Greeks of the Azov Region. 1999, Donetsk, celebrating the 220th anniversary of the migration of Greeks from the Crimea.
- Hellenes of the Azov Region: Yesterday, today, tomorrow
- Modern wedding ceremony of the Greeks

In 1998, the museum participated in the international conference Ukraine-Greece – Prospects for development and cooperation.

The museum conducts walking tours of the settlement of Sartana for tourists.

== Gallery ==
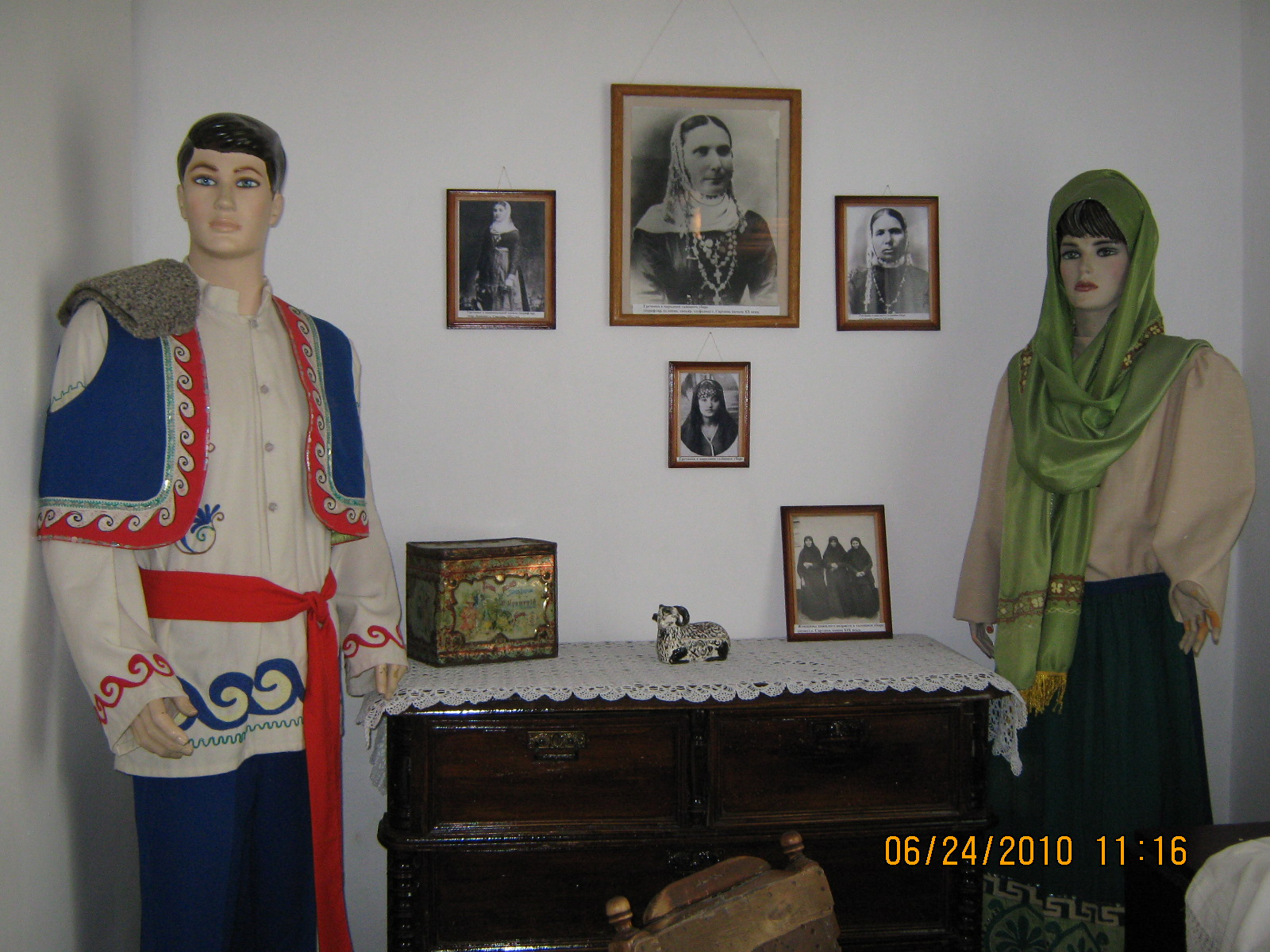

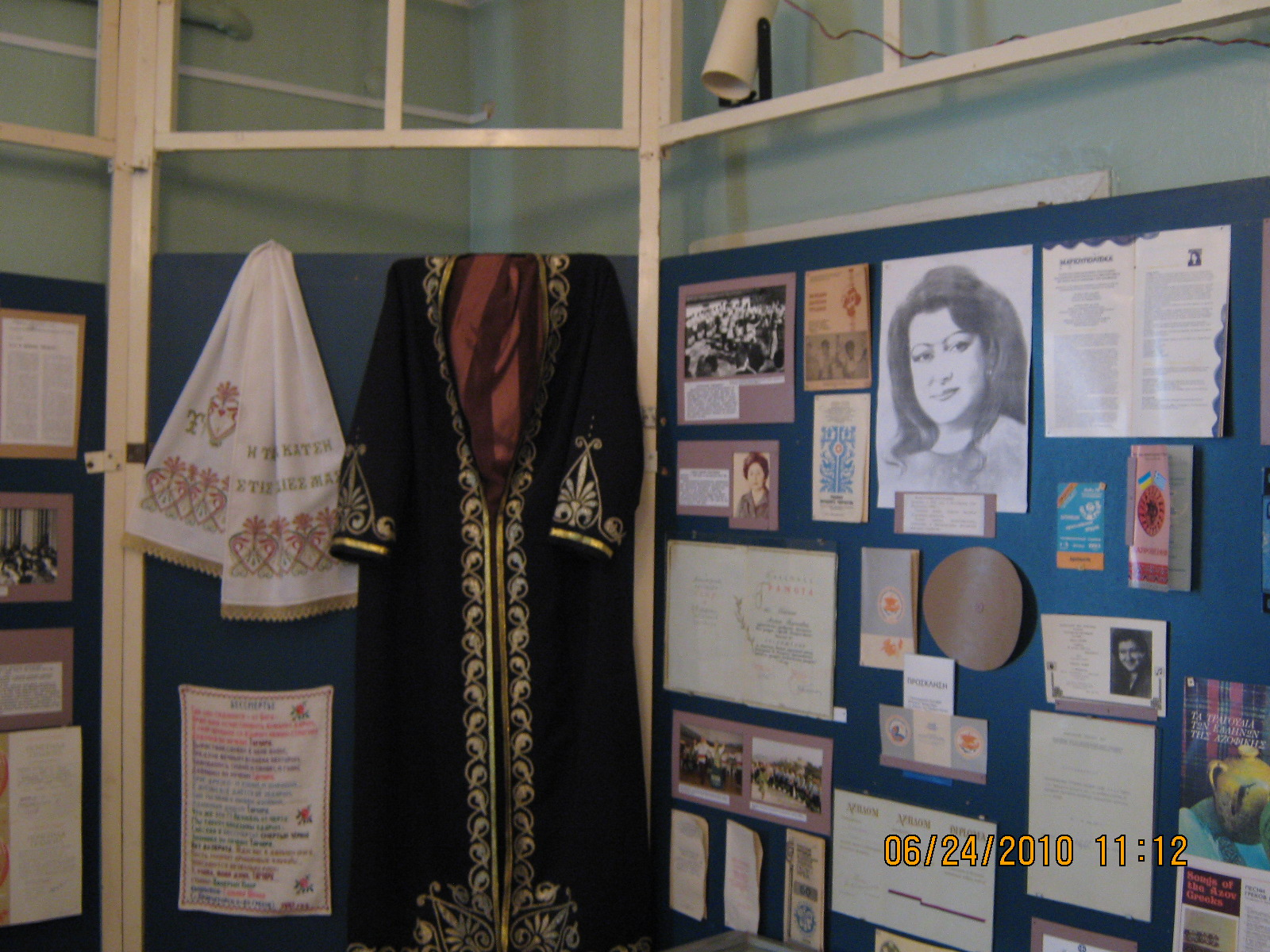

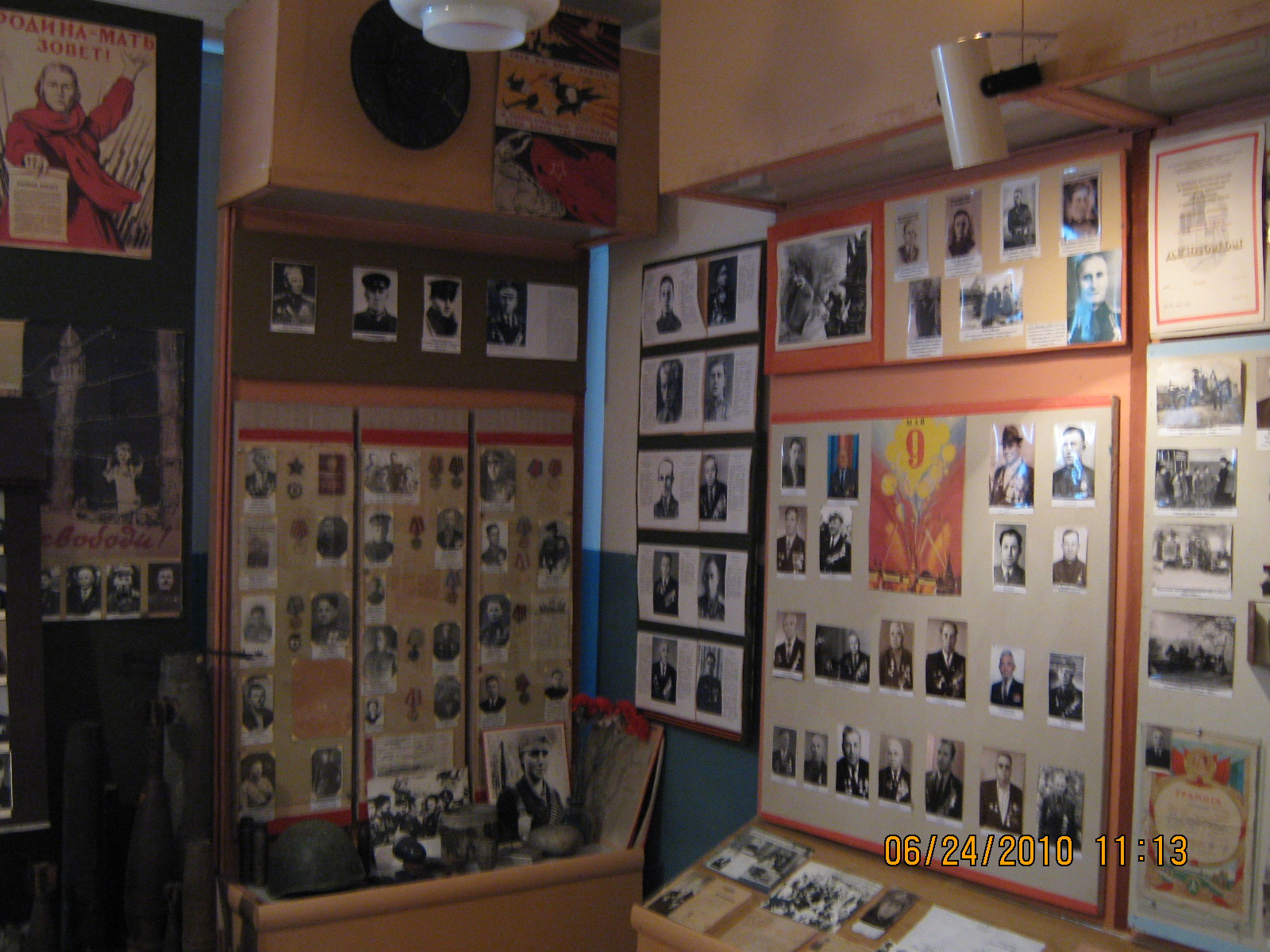

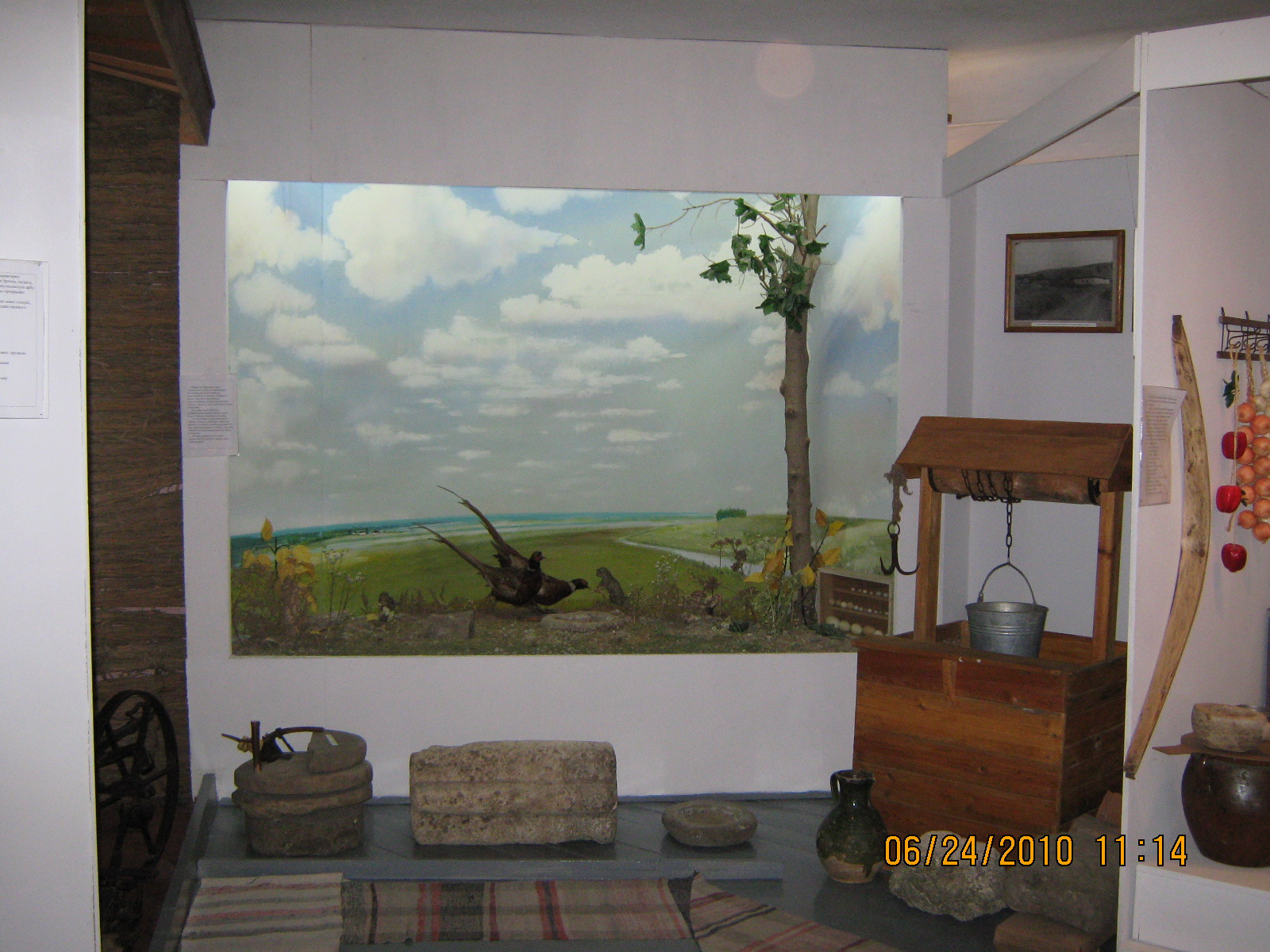

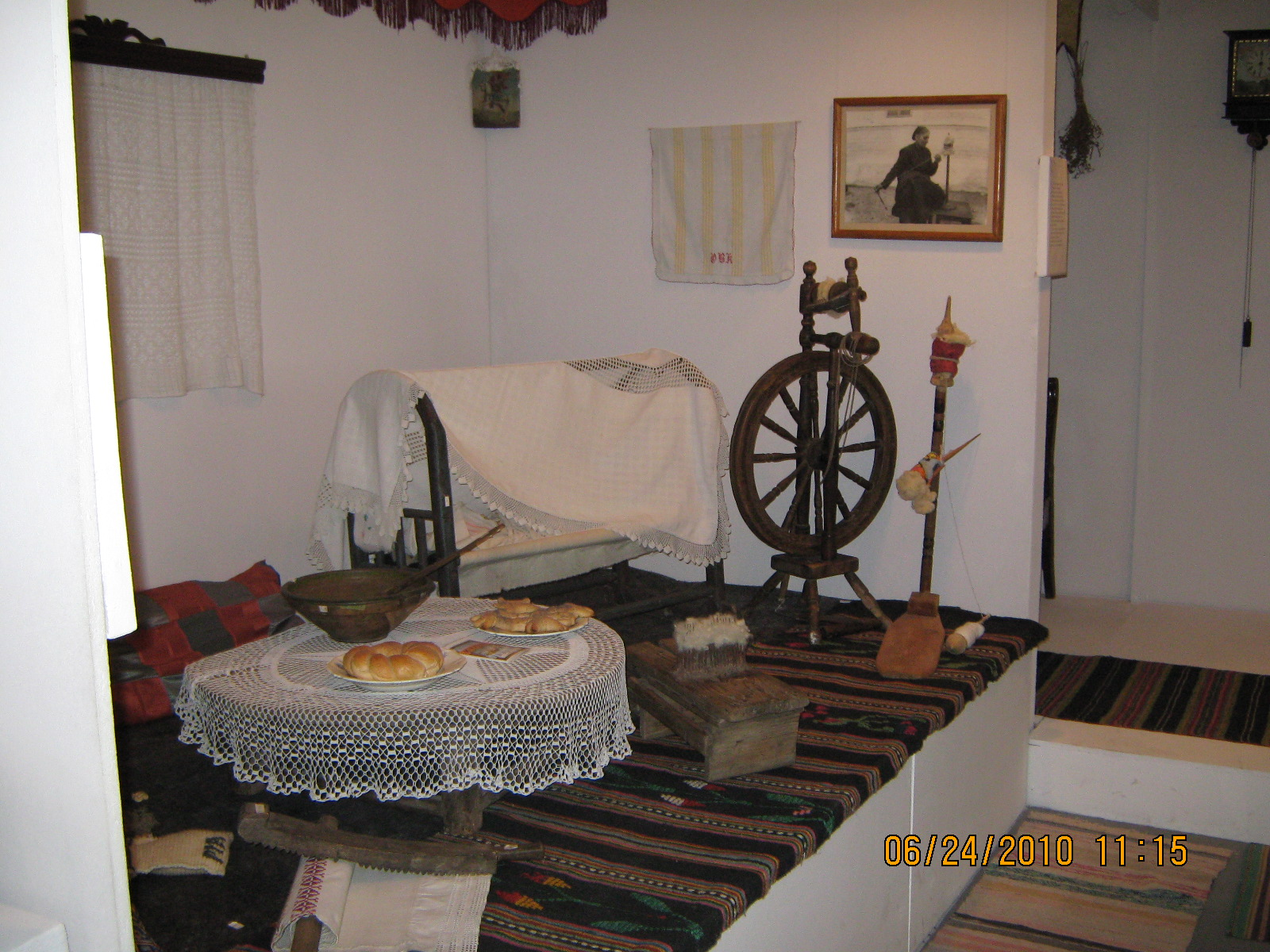

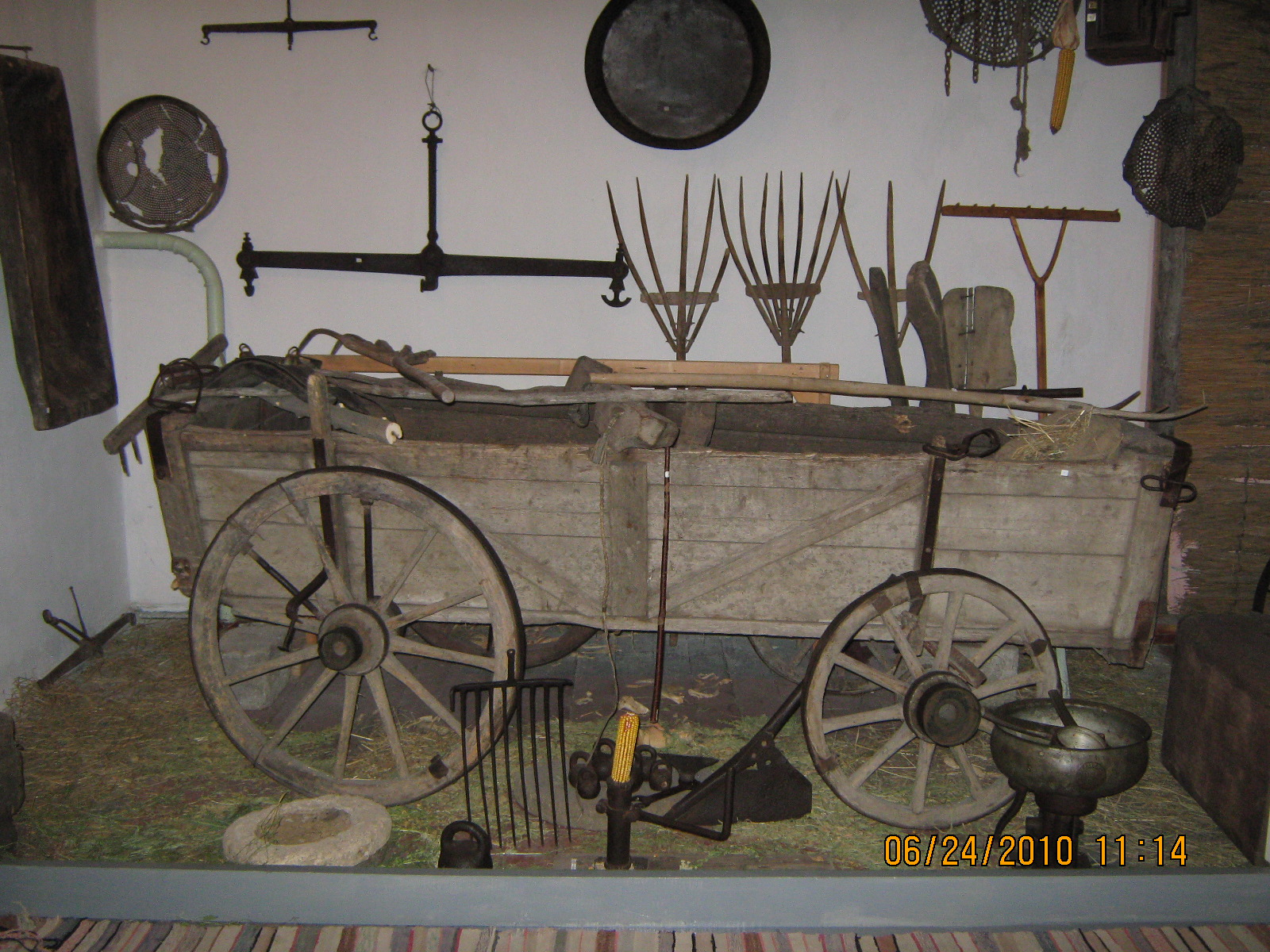

== See also ==
- Mariupol Museum of Local Lore
- The Azov Greek Museum description and photos
