= Sartana, Ukraine =

Urban locality in Donetsk Oblast, Ukraine

Sartana Сартана
- Rural settlement
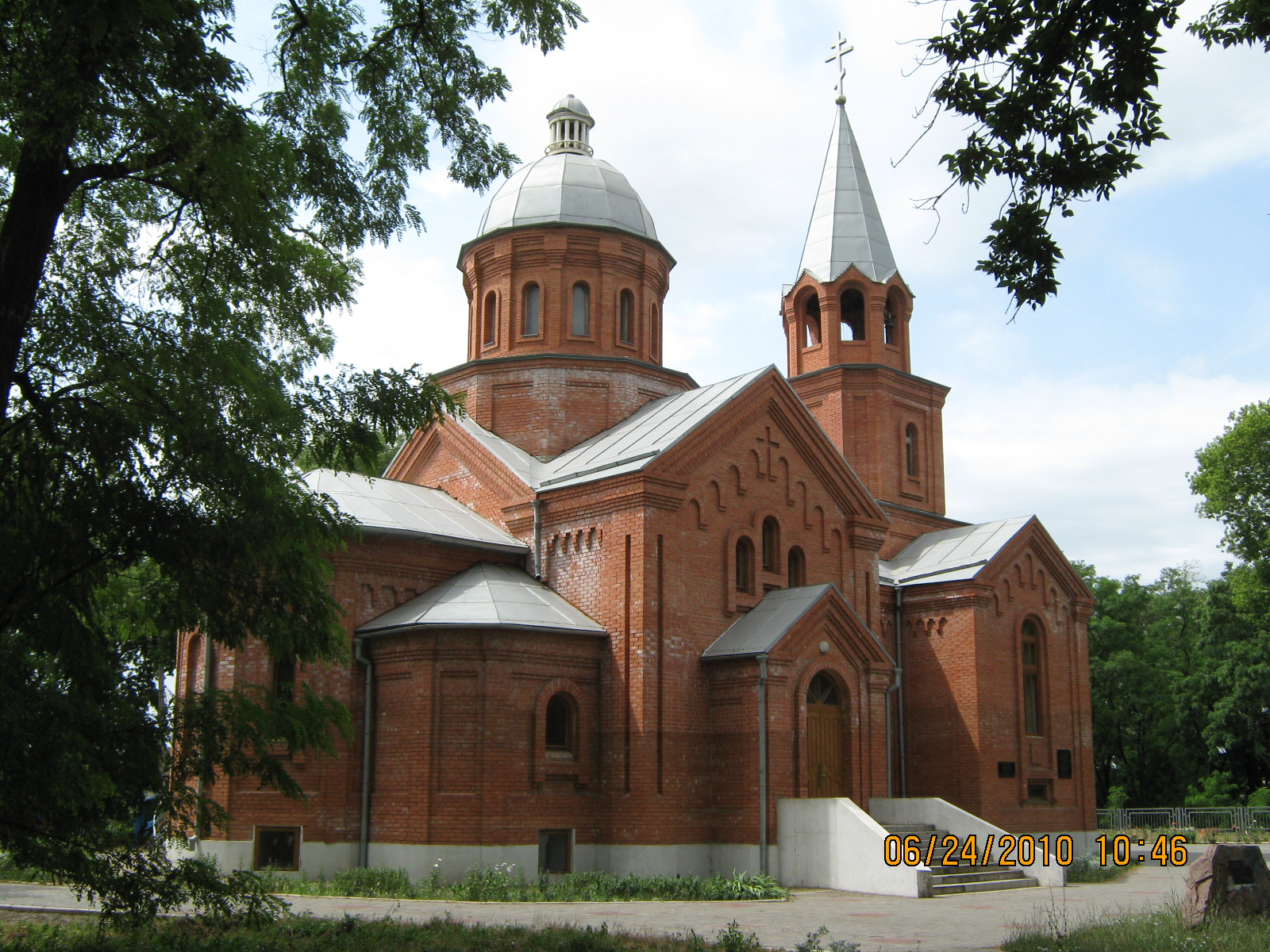
- St. George's Church

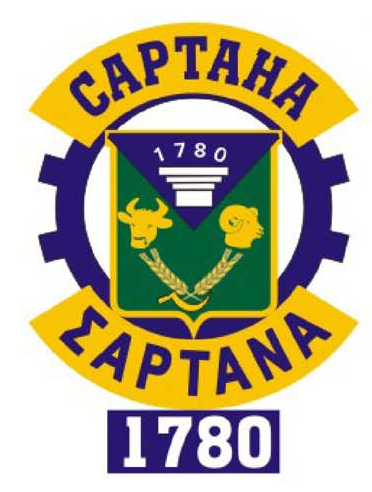
- Coat of arms
- Interactive map of Sartana
- Location of Sartana in Donetsk Oblast Sartana (Donetsk Oblast)
- Coordinates: 47°10′00″N 37°41′00″E
- Country: Ukraine
- Oblast: Donetsk Oblast
- Raion: Mariupol Raion
- Hromada: Sartana settlement hromada
- Founded: 1780

Area
  - Total: 6.75 km^{2} (2.61 sq mi)

Population (2022)
  - Total: 10,070
  - Density: 1,490/km^{2} (3,860/sq mi)
- Time zone: UTC+2 (EET)
  - Summer (DST): UTC+3 (EEST)
- Postal code: 87592, 87593
- Area code: +380 629

Sartana (Ukrainian and Russian: Сартана; Greek: Σαρτανάς or Σαρτανά, known as Primorskoe from 1938 to 1990) is a rural settlement on the banks of the river Kalmius in Donetsk oblast, eastern Ukraine. It was administratively part of the Kalmiuskyi District before 2020, and is now part of Mariupol Raion, and the settlement has close proximity to the city of Mariupol. The name of the village means "yellow calf" (sary - yellow, tana - calf) in the Urum language. Of the population of the settlement, about 10,070 (2022 estimate), the majority is ethnic Greek and speak the Greek language fluently.

== History ==
The village was founded in 1780 by Urum Greeks, resettled by the Russian government from the village of the same name in the mountainous Crimea during the Emigration of Christians from the Crimea in 1778. The resettlement was initiated by a decree signed by Catherine the Great in 1779, which is kept in the Mariupol Museum of Local Lore. The decree included the transportation of the Greek population, as well as special privileges for the establishment of agriculture, fisheries, trade and industry. One of the pioneers was Archbishop Ignatius, and about 19,000 Greeks moved with him.

In 1807, Mariupol and the surrounding Greek villages were recognised as an independent administrative unit, with an exclusively Greek population. In 1824, a stone church was built in the town in honor of the Holy Great Martyr George the Victorious in the tradition of Greek architecture. From 1825 to 1831, the Mariupol Theological Seminary operated in the village. In 1898, the Belgian company SA Providence Russe opened a steelworks in Sartana, now the Ilyich Steel & Iron Works.

In 1935, the Greek folk song and dance ensemble, "The Diamonds of Sartana", was founded in Sartana, and became popular across Ukraine and in Moscow. In 1936, the ensemble took first place in the All-Union Review of National Minority Groups in Moscow, but was forced to close in 1937 due to political repressions. In 1967, through the efforts of Maria Gaitan and other enthusiasts, it was recreated under the name "Sartana Gems" and became the leading Greek group of the Sea of Azov and Ukraine.

From 1938 to 1990, the town was named Primorskoe.

In 1987, the Museum of the History and Ethnography of the Greeks of the Azov Region was founded in the village.

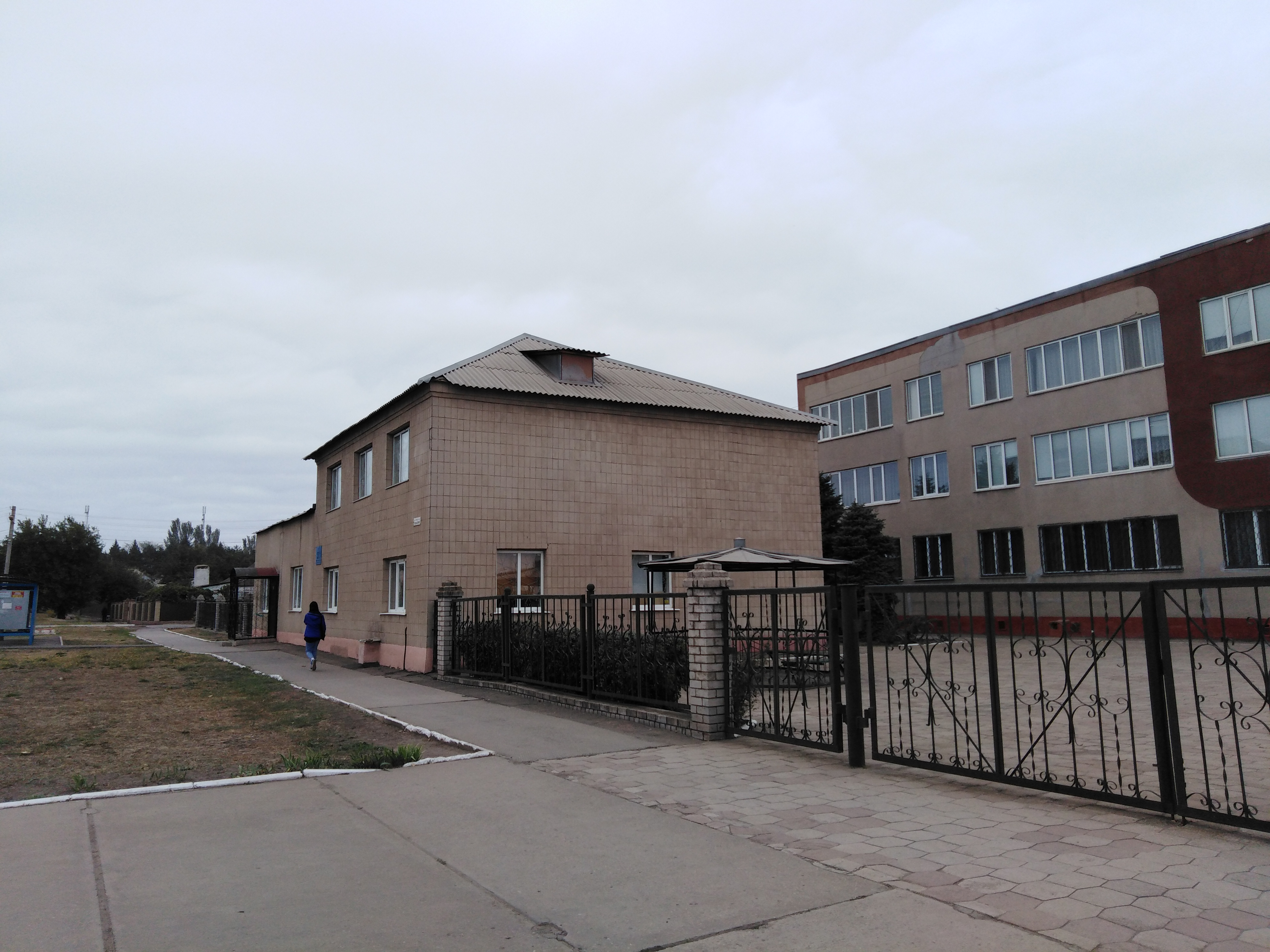
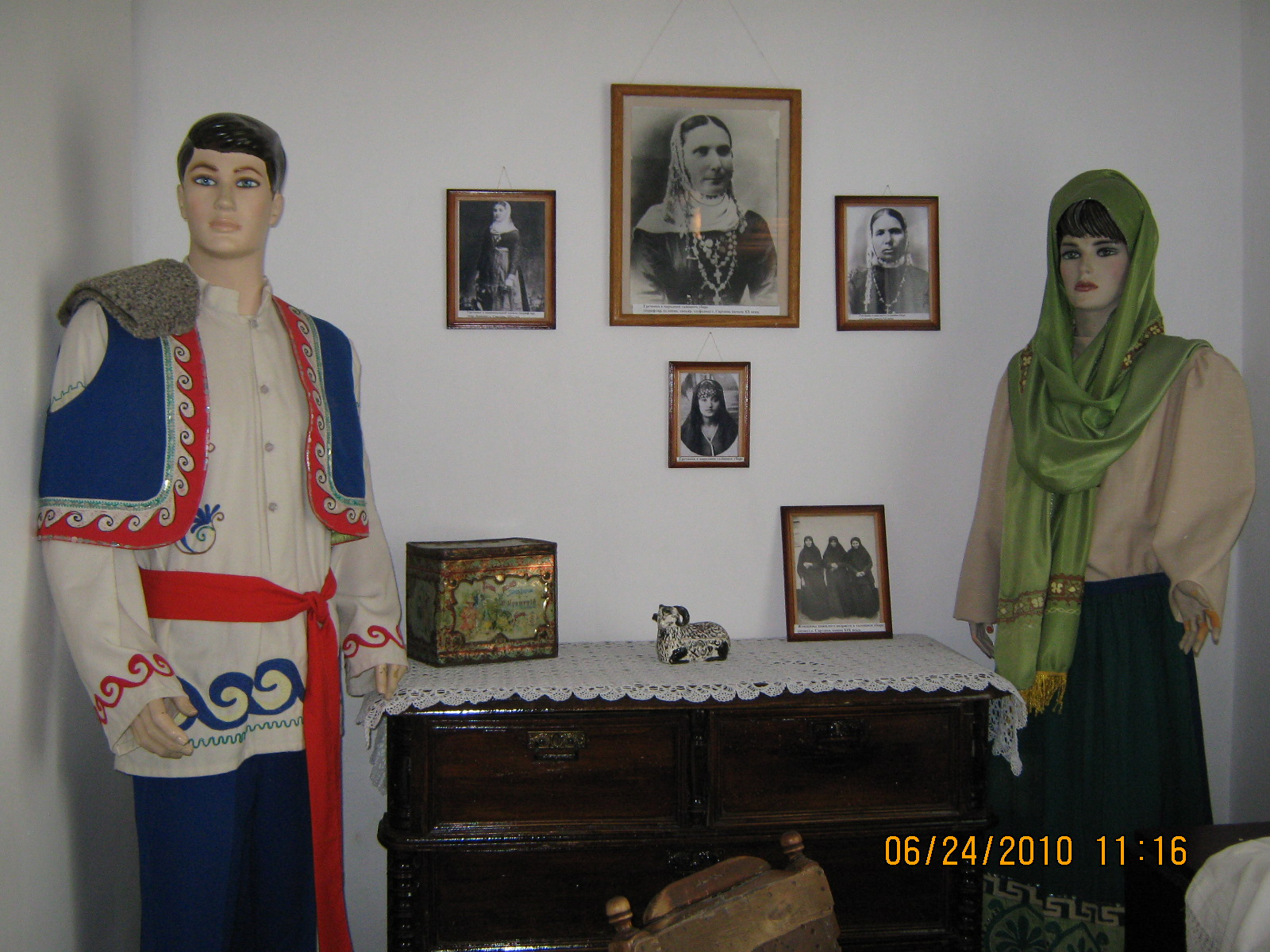
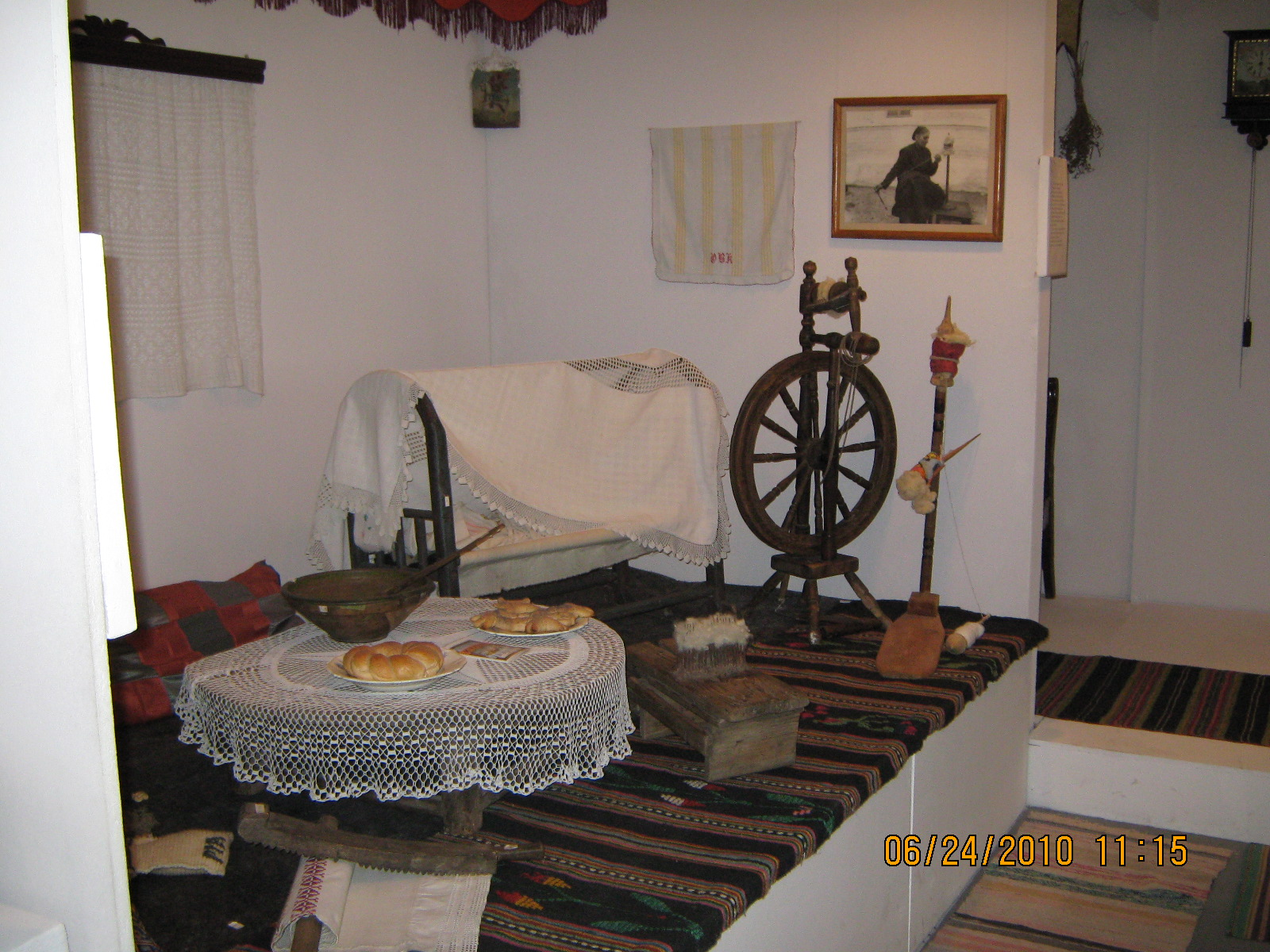
Museum of the History and Ethnography of the Greeks of the Azov Sea Region

On March 6, 2004, a broiler factory was opened in Sartana. In 2005, a new church of St. George the Victorious was built. In 2014 and 2015, during the armed conflict in eastern Ukraine, the village suffered from direct hostilities. On 26 February 2022, Sartana and the nearby village of Buhas was allegedly shelled by the Russian Air Force during the 2022 Russian invasion of Ukraine, killing ten people, all ethnic Greeks. The incident was condemned by the Greek Foreign Ministry, Prime Minister Kyriakos Mitsotakis and opposition politician Alexis Tsipras.

It was reported in a letter written by Alexandra Protsenko-Pichadzhi, President of the Federation of Greek Communities of Ukraine, that the town of Sartana was heavily damaged by Russian troops. The Russian Embassy in Athens expressed condolences for the dead, but then added that the Russian Air Force was not responsible for the attack. On February 28, 2022, the Mayor of Mariupol, Vadym Boychenko, alleged that two ethnic Greeks were killed in an airstrike by a Russian plane, however, this information remains unconfirmed at this moment as there is no photographic or video evidence. On March 1, 2022, it was reported Russia captured Sartana as part of the Siege of Mariupol.

According to the Ukrainian partisan group "CPOK", one of three training grounds for the newly arrived North Korean soldiers in vicinity of Mariupol is located near the village, where intensive training with artillery is taking place. The group noted that many remaining residents of Sartana started to collaborate with Russia.

== Demographics ==
As of the Ukrainian national census in 2001, the town had a population of 10,951 people. The population overwhelmingly consists of Ukrainian Greeks, Ukrainians and Russians, yet smaller Belarusian, German and Romani minorities also exist in the town. The lingua franca in the town is Russian. The exact linguistic composition was as follows:

Primary languages (2001)
	percent
Russian	91.6%
Greek^{1}	4.4%
Ukrainian	3.6%
Belarusian	0.1%
Romani	0.1%
others	0.2%

^{1} Including Mariupol Greek and Urum

== Gallery ==
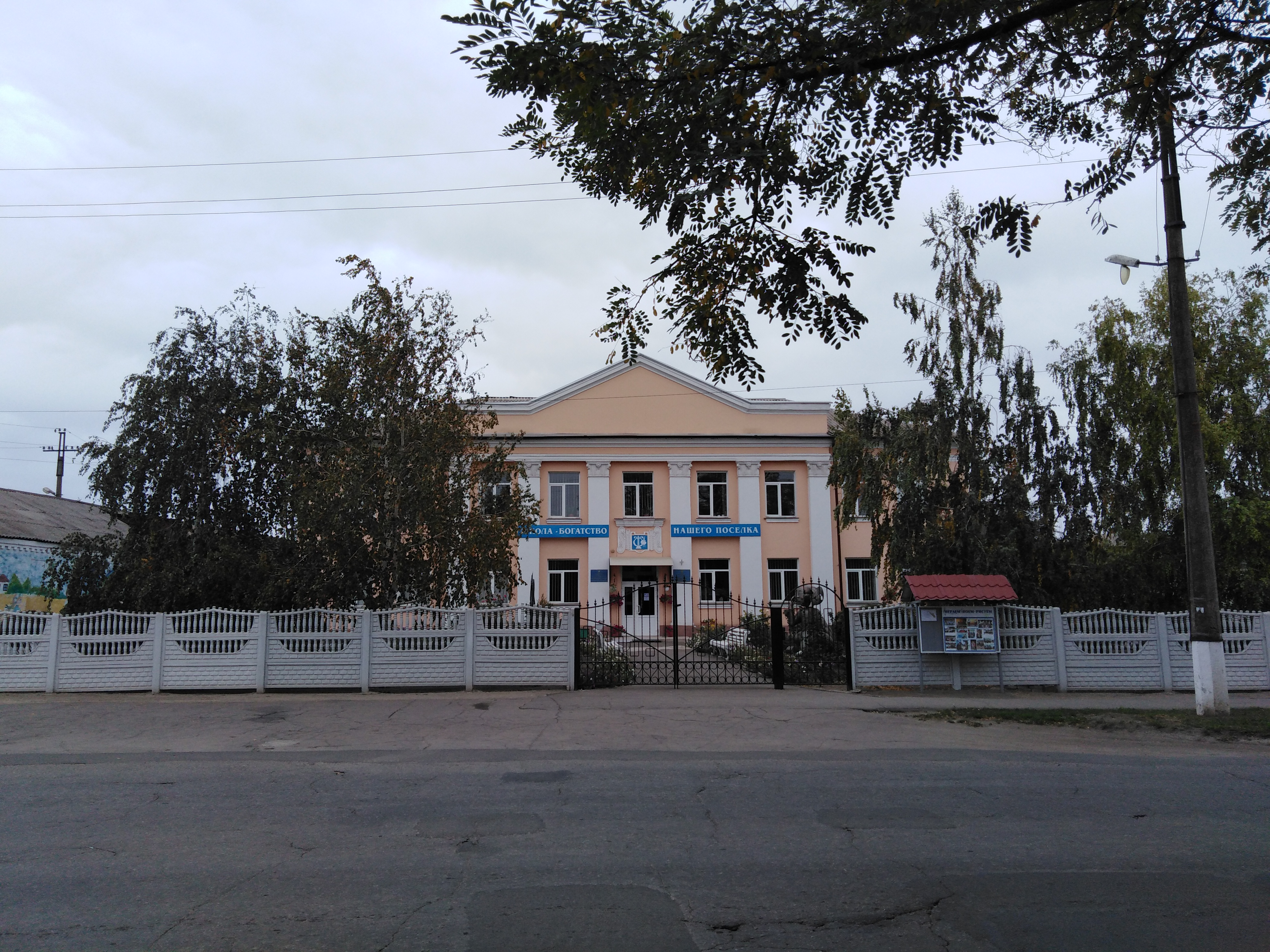
School of Music, General Kurkchi Street

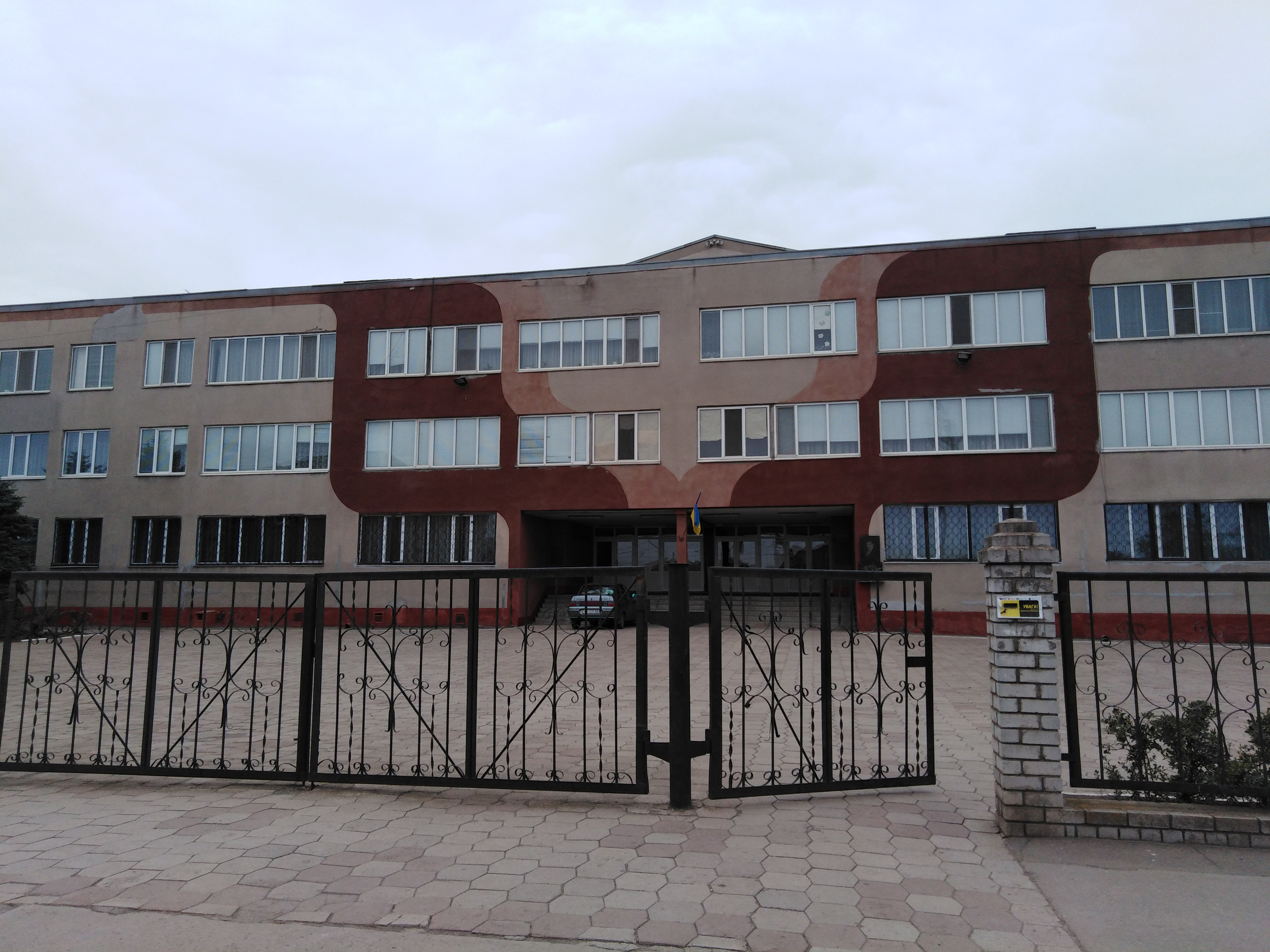
Sartana School no. 8, Partyzanska Street

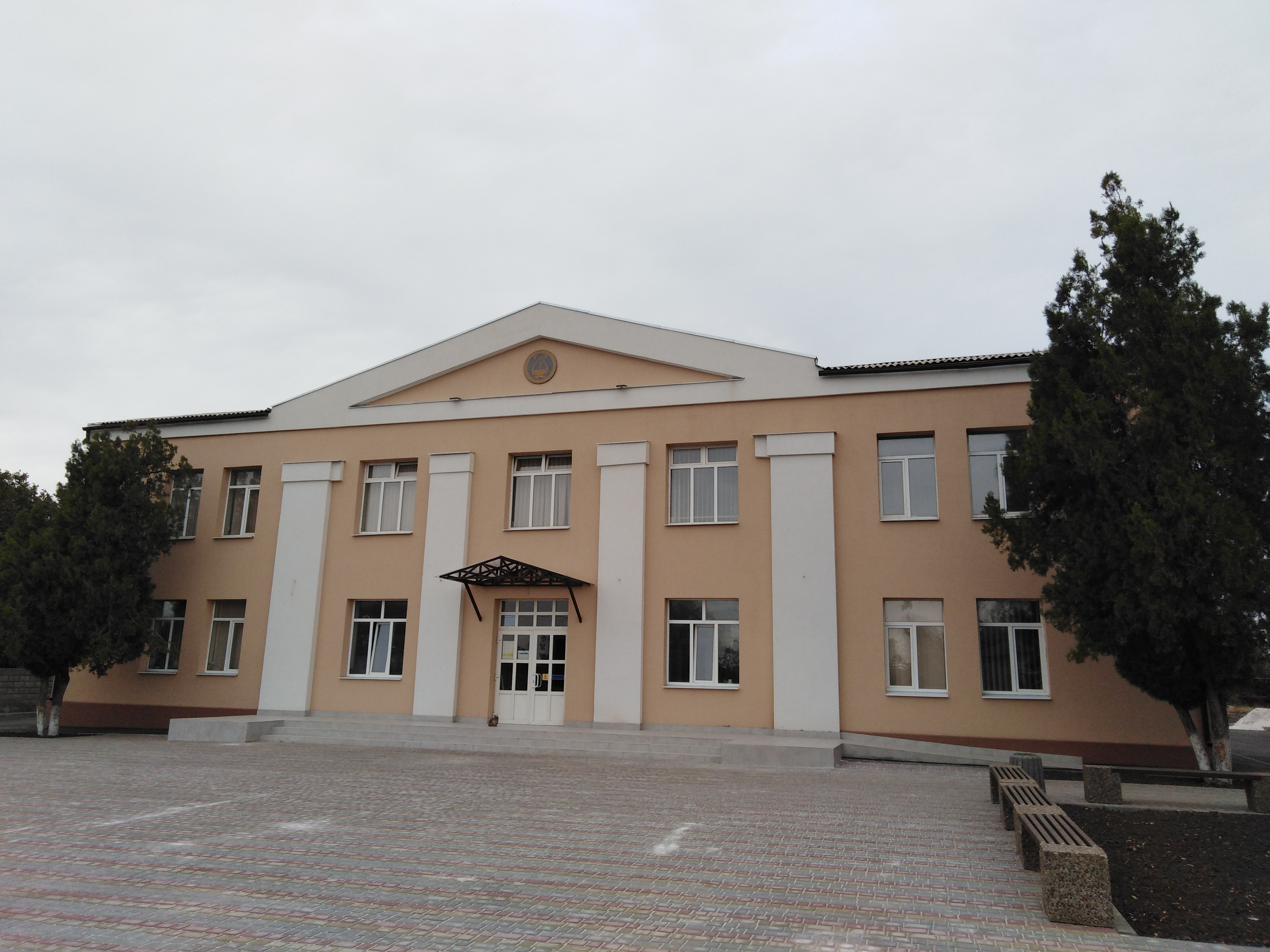
Tamara Katsa House of Culture, Cheliuskintsiv Street

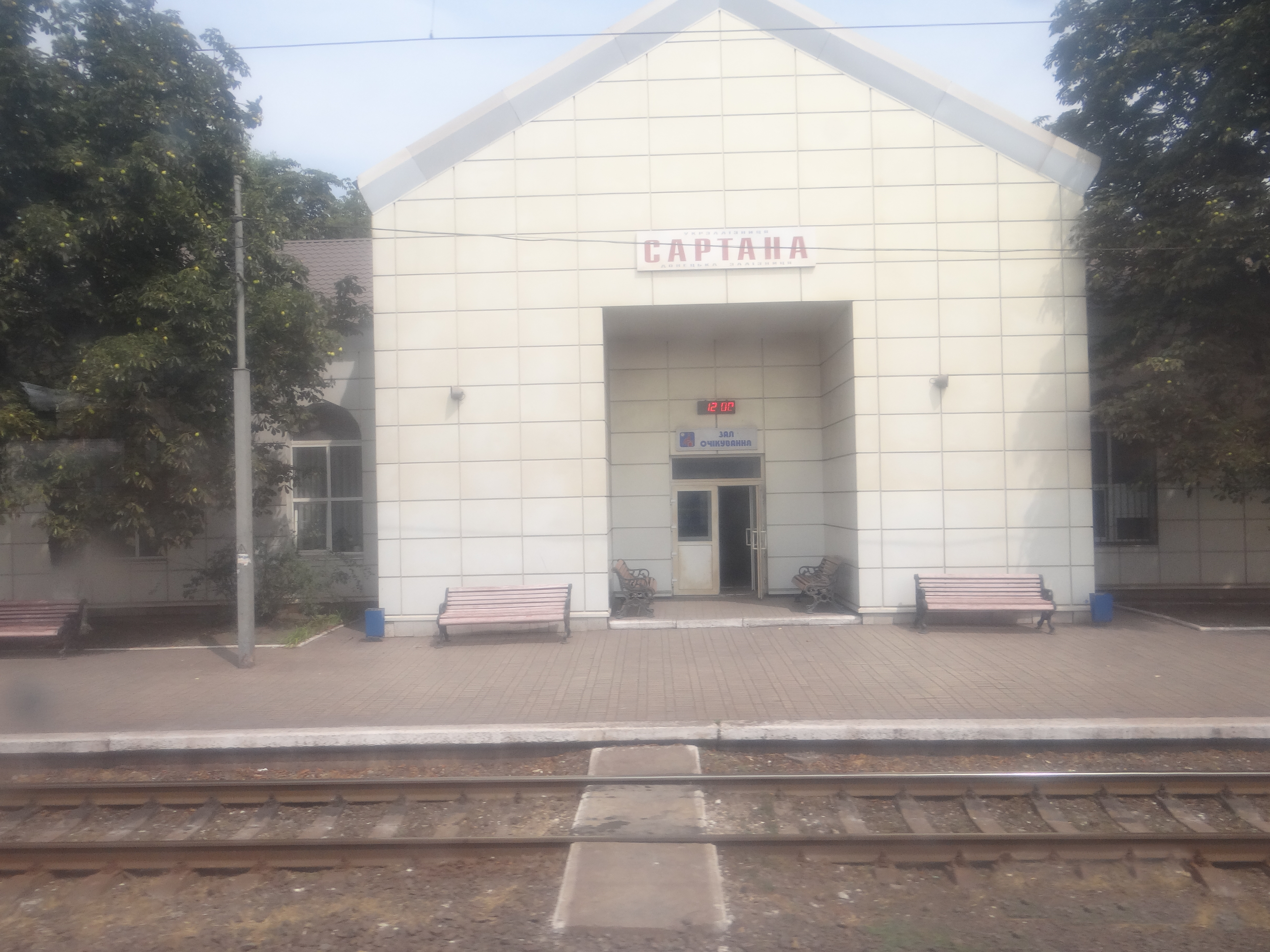
Sartana Station

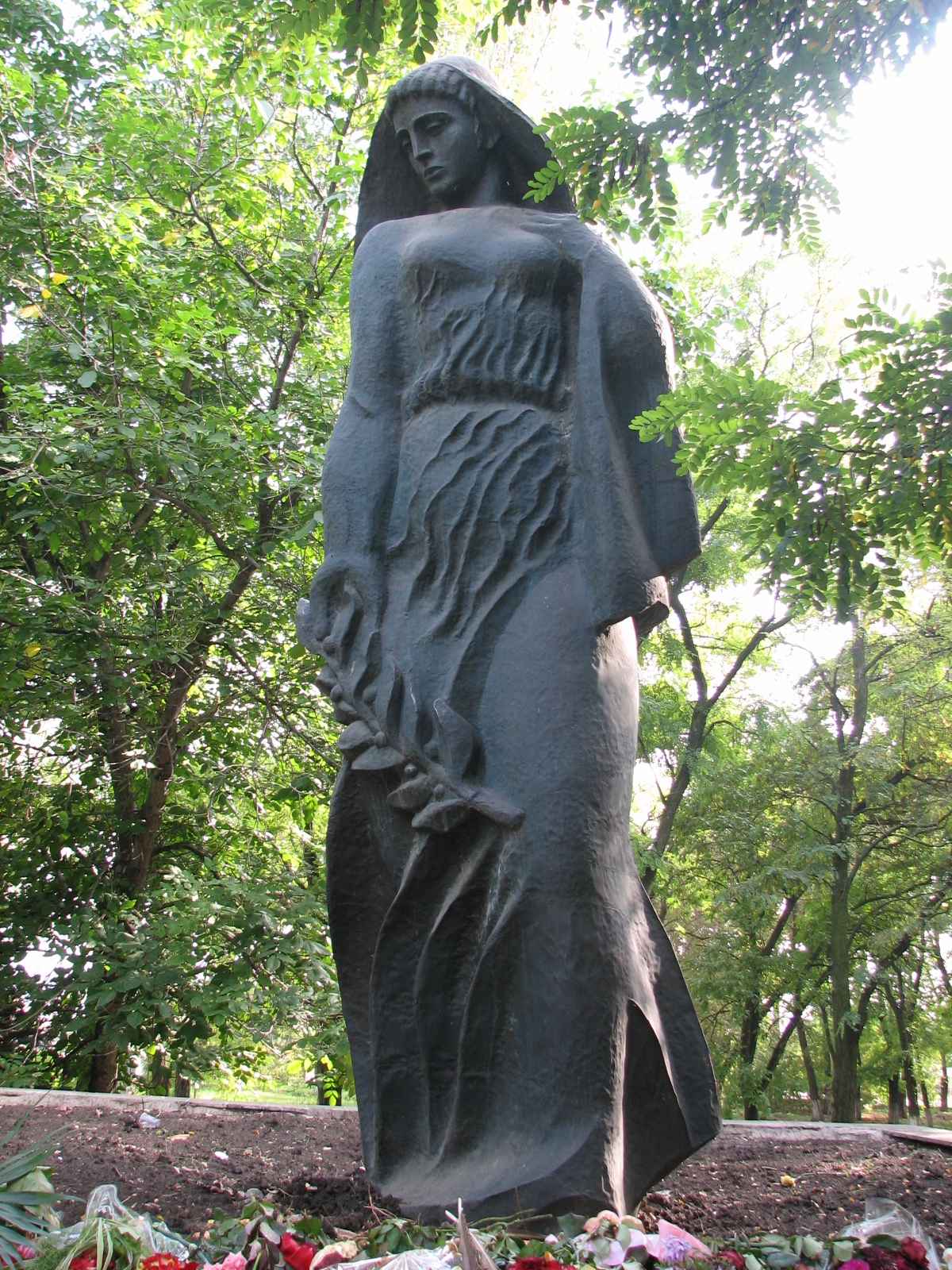
Memorial - Mass grave of Soviet soldiers of the Southern Front

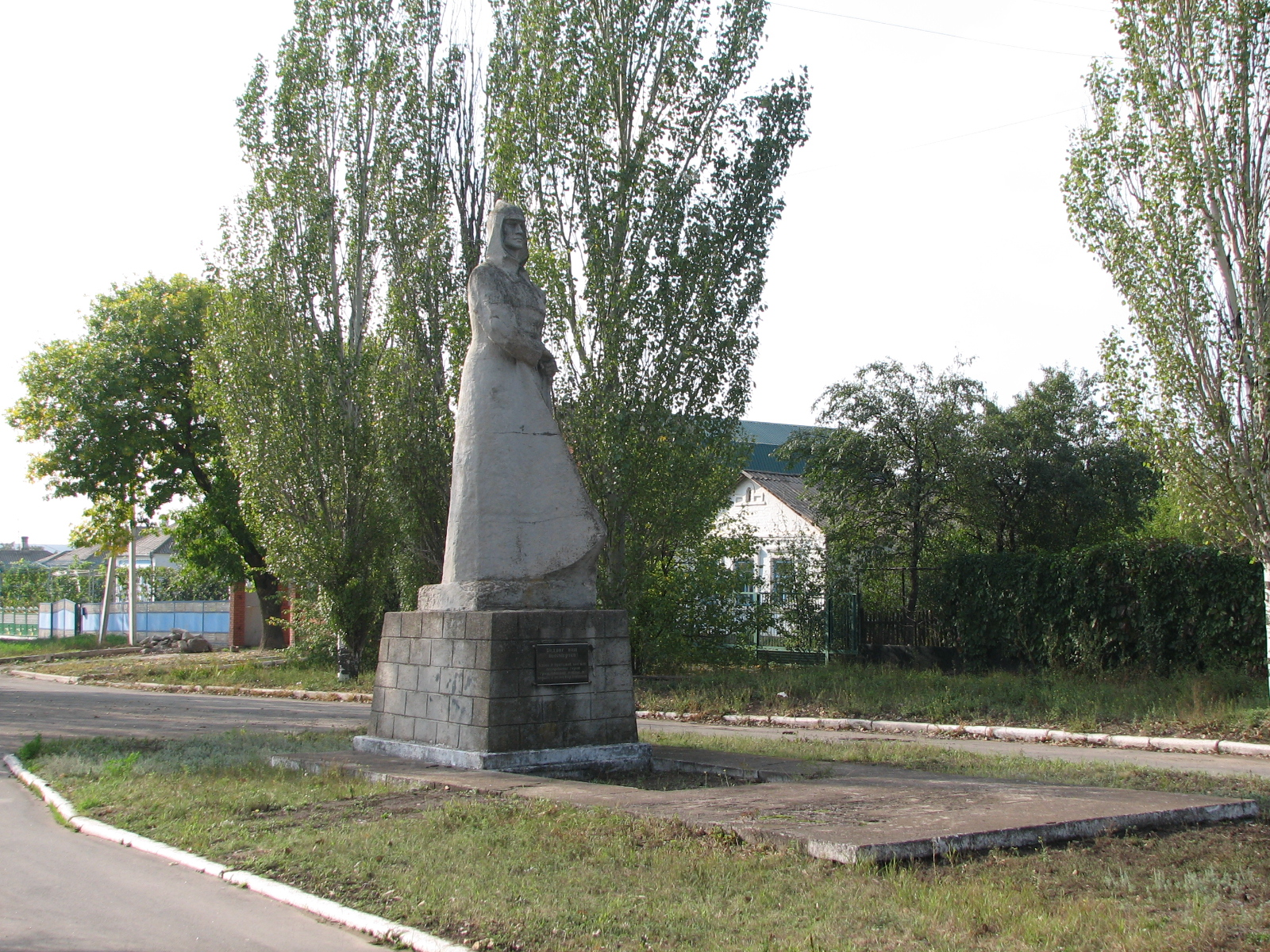
Memorial - Mass grave of the Heroes of the Civil War

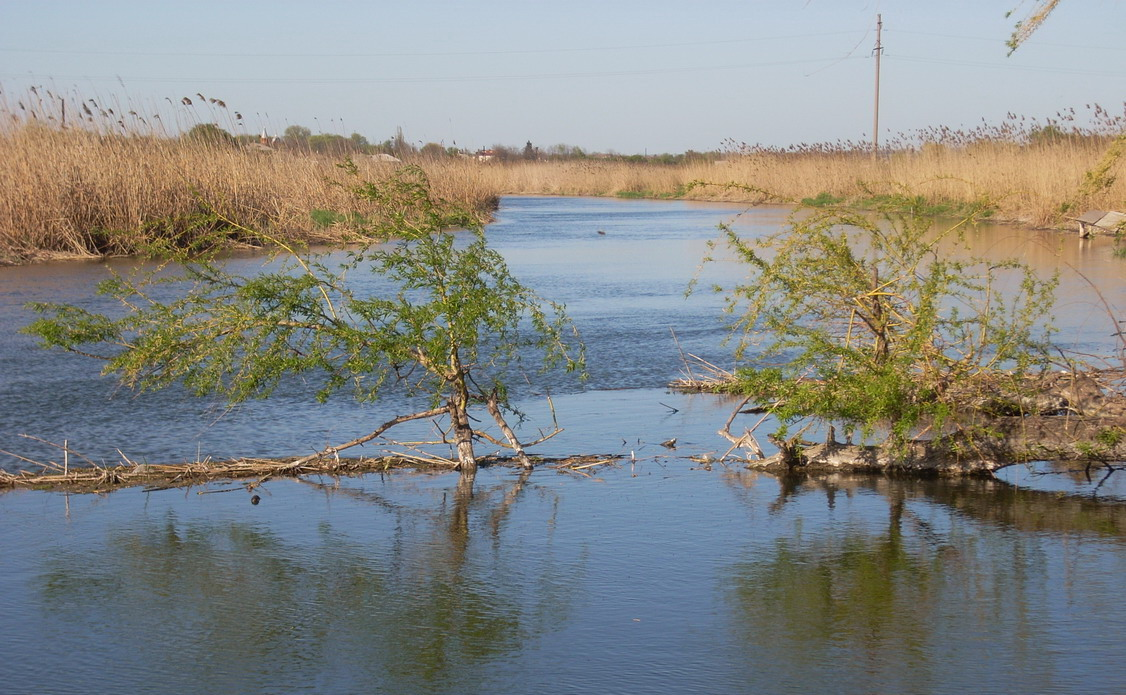
Kalmius River
