= Kuindzhi Center for Contemporary Art and Culture =

Contemporary art center in Mariupol, Ukraine

- Виставкова зала імені Архипа Куїнджі
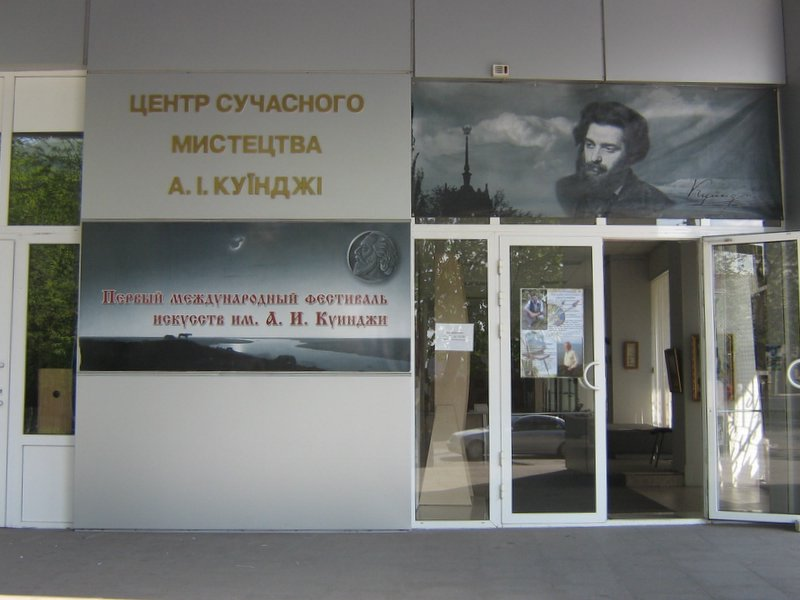
- Kuindzhi Center for Contemporary Art and Culture
- Established: 2004
- Location: Metallurgists Avenue 25, Mariupol, Donetsk Oblast 87500, Ukraine
- Coordinates: 47°05′30″N 37°32′33″E
- Type: Contemporary art

The Kuindzhi Center for Contemporary Art and Culture is an educational and cultural institution in Mariupol, Donetsk Oblast, Ukraine, in Metallurgists Avenue 25, (Ukrainian: Проспект Металургів).

== History ==
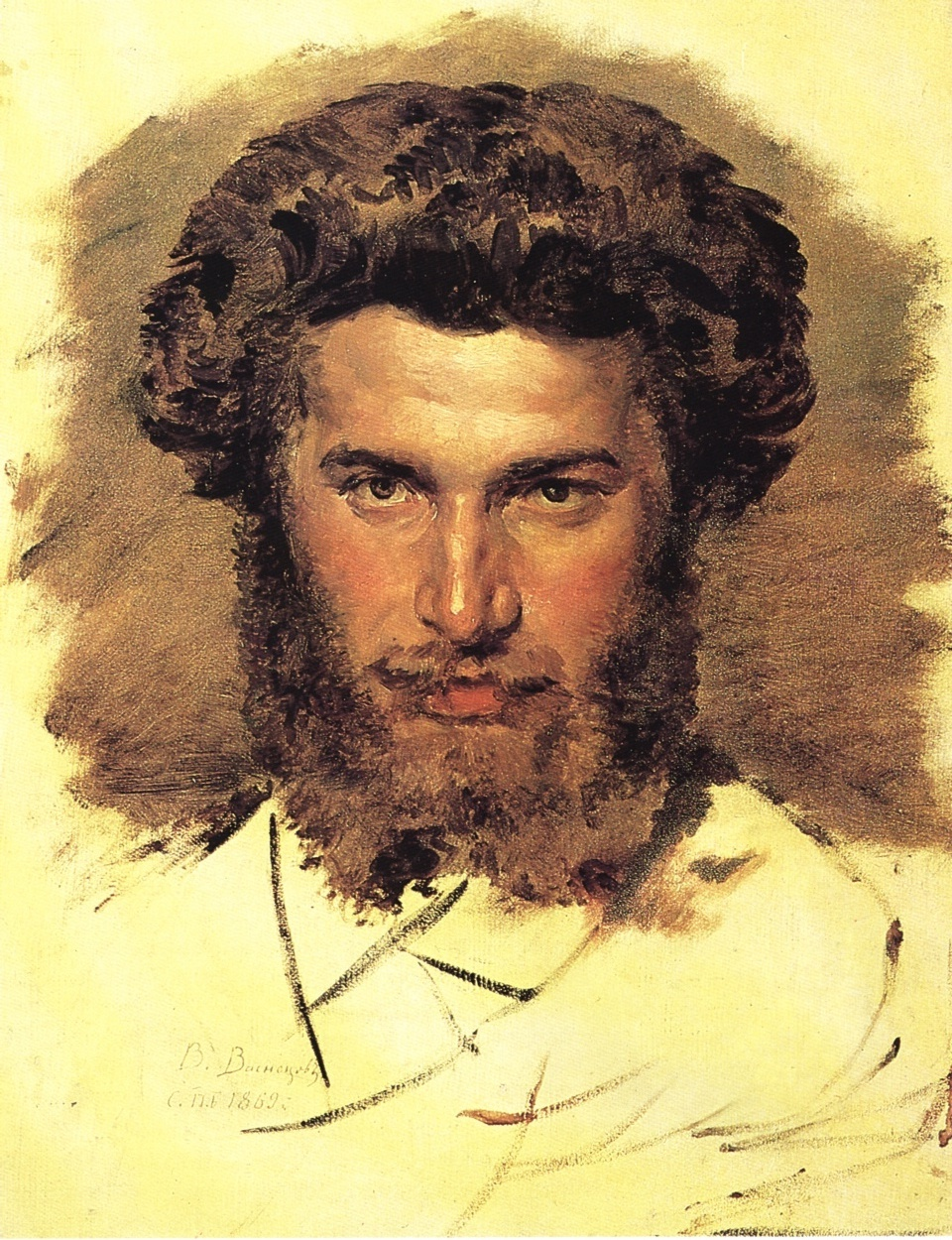
Viktor Vasnetsov. Portrait of artist Arkhip Kuindzhi. 1869. Tretyakov Gallery

The center was opened in 2004 after the reorganization of the Mariupol Museum of Local Lore of which it is a branch. It was named after the artist Arkhip Ivanovich Kuindzhi (Ukrainian: Архи́п Ива́нович Куи́нджи).

Its history begins with a collection of sculptures of the artist and honorary citizen of Mariupol, Harabet Yukhim Viktorovich (1929–2004).

The Harabet Medal Art Museum, incorporated in the centre, was named in his honour in 2005. Its exposition consists of about 700 exhibits which were donated by the artist's wife Svetlana Otchenashenko-Harabet. These include medals, plaques, tokens, medallions, emblems, bas-reliefs and sculptures of small stature. The exhibits are made of various metals, alloys, porcelain, clay, plaster, terracotta, and others.

== Exhibitions and activities ==
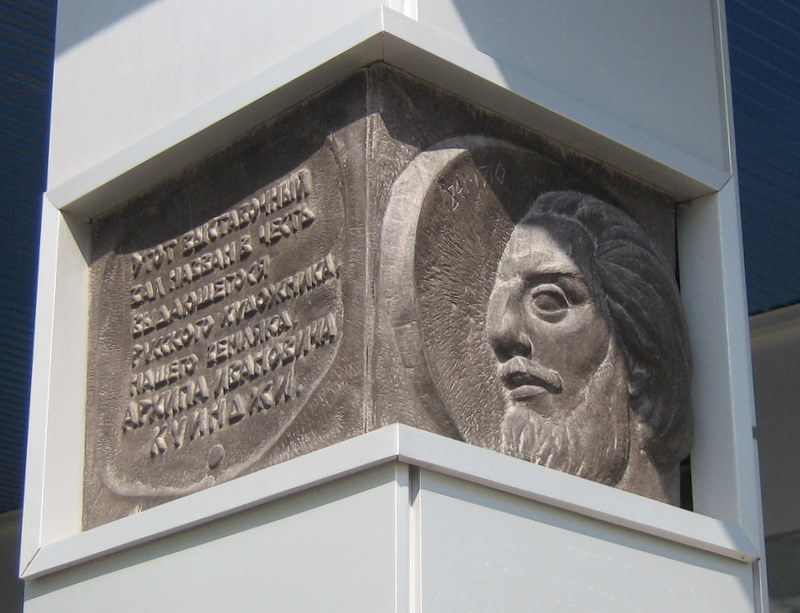
Abstract plaque in honor of Arkhip Kuindzhi at the Kuindzhi Center for Contemporary Art and Culture

Over 70 exhibitions and educational and scientific activities are held annually at the Kuindzhi Center, and its collection comprises more than 2,200 exhibits.

The museum combines an exhibition hall and a museum of medal art. The exhibition presents works of various stylistic directions of painting and graphics, arts and crafts and sculpture, such as objectlessness and neoclassicism, monumentalism and chamber poetry, socialist realism and post-avant-garde painting. Information zones, photos, videos and text materials allow visitors to appreciate contemporary art of Ukraine across the 20th and 21st centuries.

The medal collection of Harabet illustrates history and encompasses various materials: copper, bronze, silver and various alloys. The exposition includes state awards ("Honorary Badge of the President of Ukraine", coat of arms, flag, ceremonial badge of the Mayor of Mariupol), memorials, medal and emblematic series associated with the names of scientists and cultural figures, famous heroes of the Second Patriotic War, heroes of space conquest, sports achievements and prize medals of international tournaments.

The museum has been hosting works by artists from Mariupol and across Ukraine, whose works are displayed in the National Art Museum of Ukraine, in the collections of Europe, America, and more. Exhibits include the works of Yukhim Harabet – the State Awards of Ukraine – "Honorary Award of the President", the Order and Medal of Bohdan Khmelnytsky, the Medal "Defender of the Fatherland", Alexander Klimenko's painting "Vladimir's Icon of the Mother of God" (2014, shell cover, tempera, gold leaf, 53.5x30), and Emma Andrievskaya's painting "Above the clouds – as a tribute to Leonardo da Vinci".

The center's activity program includes the conducting of music salons, poetry readings, excursions, as well as master classes with famous artists of Ukraine.

Exhibitions commencing in February 2022

- "Faster than the Wind" by Mariupol watercolor artist Borys Dovhanyuk.
- "Golden Cinderella" by the city club of historical and technical modeling.
- "Call of the Heart" by the impressionist artist Serhiy Smetankin.
- "Thinking of the Eternal" by sculptor of modern times Olekiy Leonov (Kyiv).
- "Wonderful Details" – an exhibition of paintings.

== See also ==
- Mariupol Museum of Local Lore
- Kuindzhi Art Museum
