= Kuindzhi Art Museum =

Art museum in Mariupol, Ukraine

Coordinates: 47°05′37″N 37°33′03″E

- Художній музей імені Куїнджі
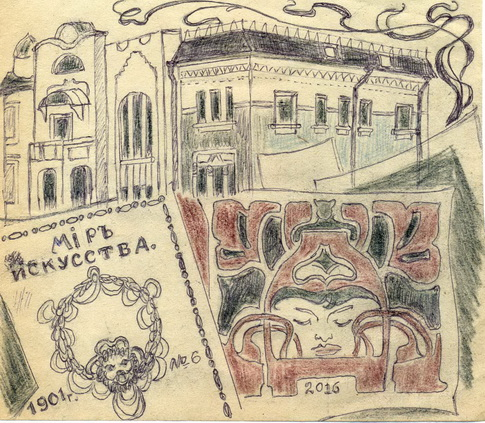
- Established: 30 October 2010; 15 years ago
- Dissolved: 2022
- Location: Georgievskaya Street 58, Mariupol, Donetsk Oblast 87500, Ukraine
- Type: Art museum
- Director: Tatiana Buli

The Kuindzhi Art Museum (Ukrainian: Художній музей імені Куїнджі, romanized: Khudozhniy muzey imeni Kuyindzhi) was an art museum located in the city of Mariupol in Ukraine. It is dedicated to the display of the life and works of the artist Arkhip Kuindzhi, who was born in the city. The museum opened on 30 October 2010, but its creation was proposed almost a century earlier.

The museum building was damaged by an airstrike on 21 March 2022, during the Siege of Mariupol. Three original works by Kuindzhi were in the basement and were not damaged.

== History ==
The history of Mariupol as a sustainable settlement began in 1778. Therefore, there are relatively few architectural monuments in the city, and some of the most valuable ones have been destroyed without restoration (all Orthodox churches in the city, the Zemstvo, most of the historic shops on Torgovaya Street, the historic buildings of the central Kateryninskaya Street). Among the accidentally preserved buildings, the most fully represented are those in the Secession style (a decorative style of capitalism - Art Nouveau).

The creation of a museum in Mariupol dedicated to Arkhip Kuindzhi was first suggested in 1914. A potential donation of works from the Kuindzhi Society of Artists was proposed, but the First World War delayed decision-making. Serious consideration to the construction of a museum was once again made in the 1960s, but funding was unavailable for a museum and the Kuindzhi Exhibition Centre opened instead. In 1997 premises were donated and renovation began in 2008.

The museum opened on 30 October 2010 as a branch of the Mariupol Museum of Local Lore. It is housed in a building that was constructed in 1902 as a wedding gift for the wife of the founder of the Real School, Valentina Gadzinova. In 2015 the museum celebrated the 175th anniversary of the birth of its namesake. In 2019 the French ambassador to Ukraine, Isabelle Dumont, visited the museum, praising its work.

The museum was damaged by a Russian airstrike on 21 March 2022, during the Siege of Mariupol, although the exhibition was placed in the basement beforehand and was not damaged. Three original works by Kuindzhi, a painting by Ivan Aivazovsky, and other paintings and icons have been since removed from the museum and ended up looted by Russia, but much of the museum's collection burned down in the nearby building of the Mariupol Museum of Local Lore.

== Collections and research ==
The art collection includes 650 paintings, 960 graphic works, 150 sculptures and over 300 decorative art objects. Much of this collection was developed by the Mariupol Museum of Local History during the twentieth century.

Three original works by Kuindzhi were held at the museum, as well as copies of his works. The original works are the sketches Red West, Autumn – Crimea and Elbrus, donated by the State Russian Museum to the local history museum in Mariupol (then known as Zhdanov after a Soviet functionary) in the 1960s. Their current whereabouts are unknown.

The museum also holds papers relating to the life of Kuindzhi, as well as a copy of his 1841 Ukrainian birth certificate.

It includes the work of other artists, such as Victoria Kovalchuk who exhibited there, as well as Ivan Aivazovsky, Vasily Vereshchagin, Ivan Shishkin, amongst others.

The museum has provided evidence to support an 1841 date for Kuindzhi's birth, which has been the subject of debate due to contrasting evidence. This debate was played out between Russian and Ukrainian Wikipedias.

== Gallery ==
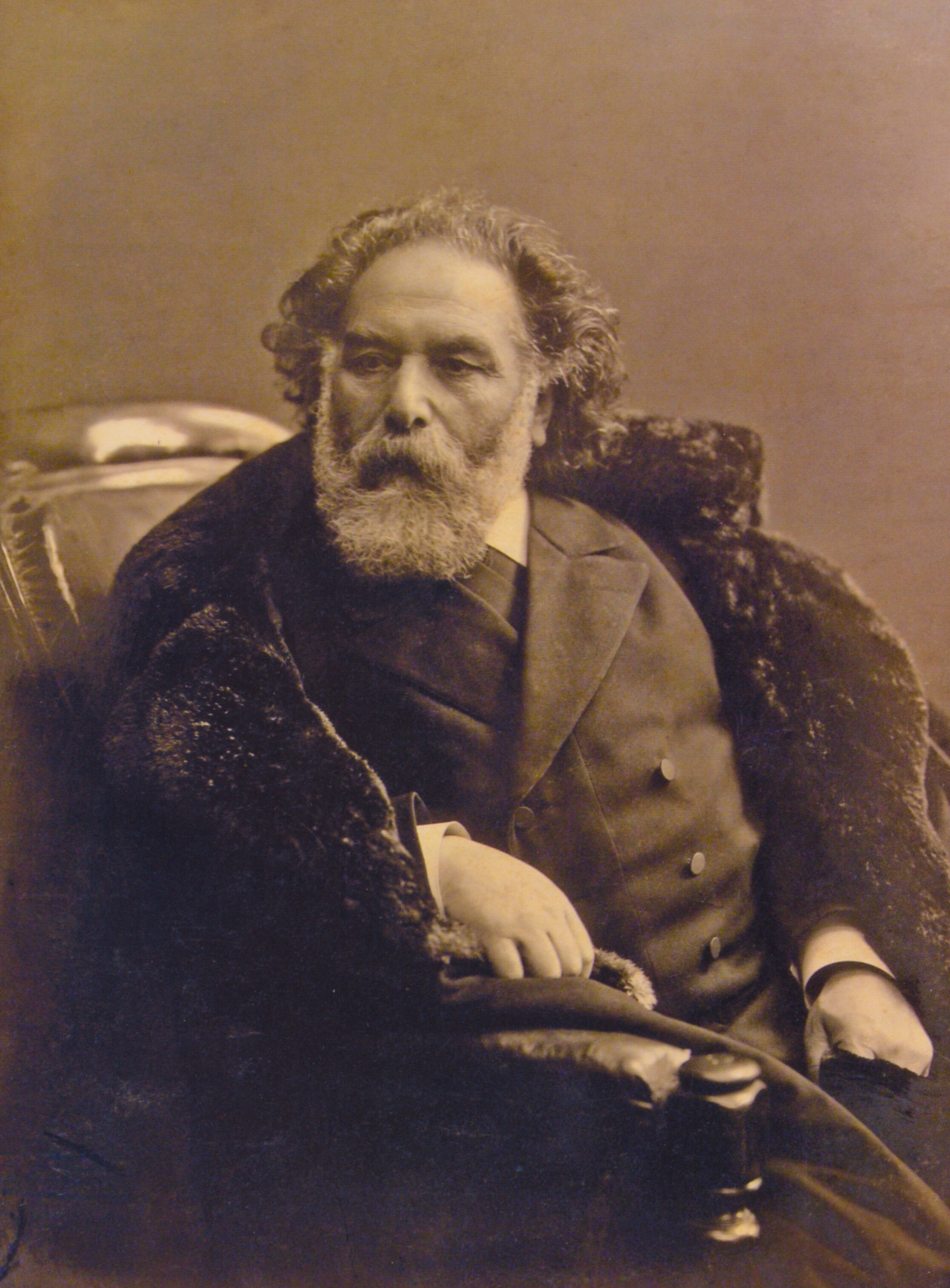
Arkhip Kuindzhi, around 1900

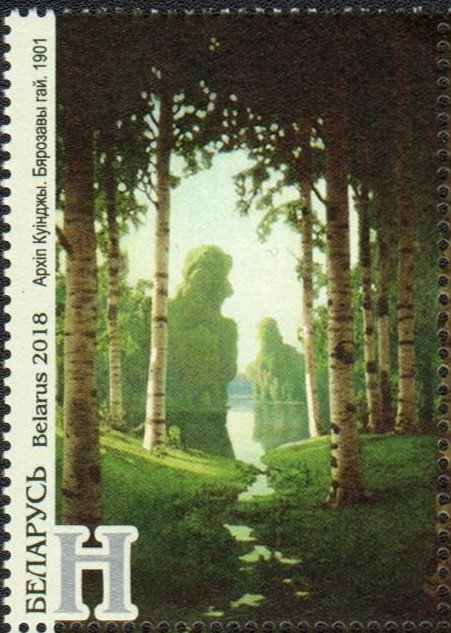
Stamp of Belarus 2018, Birch Grove, Kuindzhi 1901

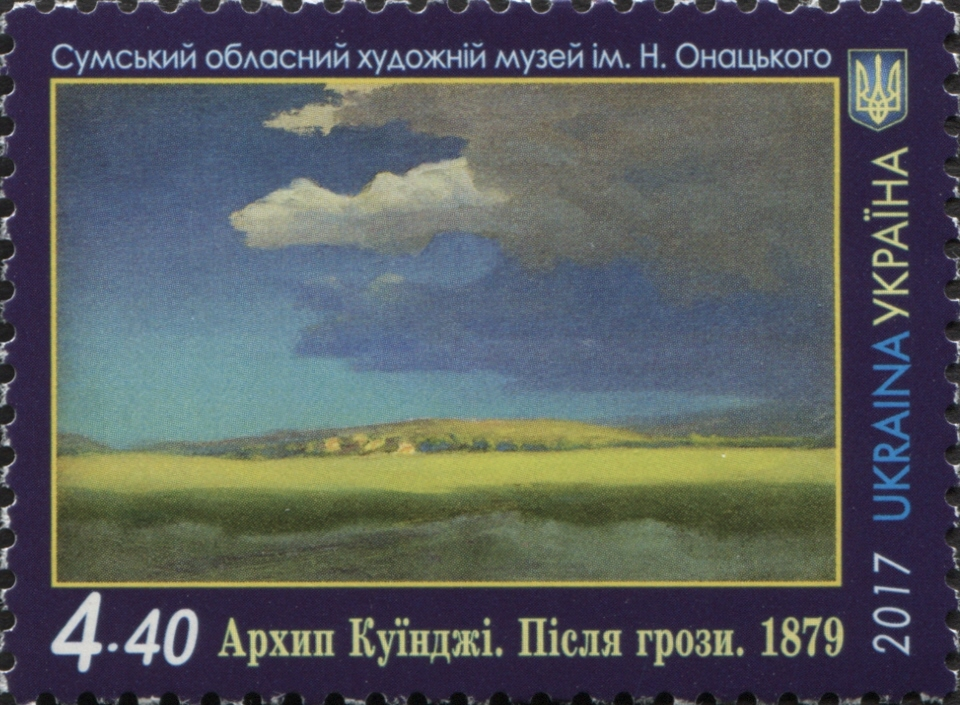
Stamp of Ukraine, After Thunderstorm, Arkhyp Kuindzhi 1879

== See also ==
- Mariupol Museum of Local Lore
- Kuindzhi Center for Contemporary Art and Culture
