= Chernihiv Regional Historical Museum =

History museum in Ukraine

Чернігівський обласний історичний музей імені В. В. Тарновського
- Chernihiv Regional Historical Museum named after V.V. Tarnovsky
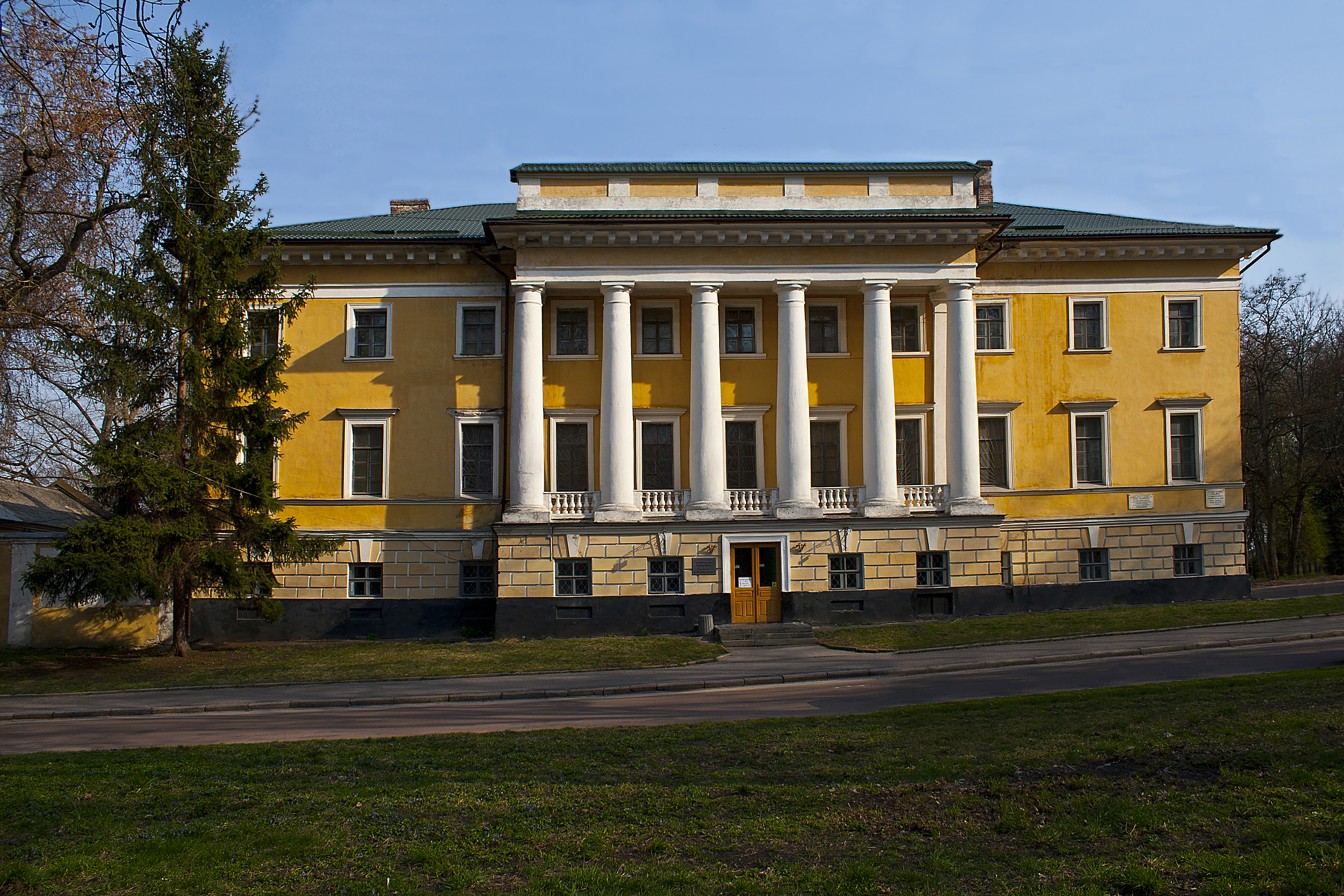
- 51°29′21″N 31°18′33″E
- Location: Muzeina Street, 4 Chernihiv, 14027 Ukraine, Ukraine
- Type: Museum
- Established: 1896-1902
- Architect: Andreyan Zakharov

Other information
- Director: Maksym Mikhailovich Blakytnyi
- Website: choim.org obucn.org.ua

Chernihiv Regional Historical Museum named after V.V. Tarnovsky (Ukrainian: Чернігівський обласний історичний музей) is one of the oldest museums in Ukraine. The museum is located in the former governor's house in Chernihiv (19th century).

== History ==
=== Origin ===
The museum was founded on 14 November 14 1896 as the Chernihiv Regional Scientific Archival Commission and its Historical Museum. In 1902, the Museum of Ukrainian Antiquities named after Vasyl Vasilyevich Tarnovsky was founded based on the collection of Vasyl Tarnovsky Jr.

=== During the USSR ===
In 1923, five museums of Chernihiv were united in the Chernihiv State Museum. In 1925, the building of the former Peasant City Bank was assigned to the Chernihiv State Unified Museum.

In 1933, Vasyl Tarnovsky's Shevchenko collection was removed from the museum (some items are currently stored at the Institute of Literature of the National Academy of Ukraine and the Taras Shevchenko National Museum). With the outbreak of World War II, part of the museum's collection was evacuated to Ufa and Orenburg. The museum building, hit by a bomb, was severely damaged by fire. In December 1943, after the liberation of Chernihiv, the museum resumed its activities in the premises of the Museum of Ukrainian Antiquities. In 1989, the Chernihiv Regional Archaeological Center was established.

In 1986, the Chernihiv Military History Museum concerning the Battle of Chernihiv was transferred to the Chernihiv Historical Museum as a department.

=== Independent Ukraine ===
In 1992, the Chernihiv Military History Museum became the Military History Department of the Chernihiv Regional Historical Museum named after Vasyl Vasilyevich Tarnovsky. In 1997, the museum was renamed "Chernihiv Regional Historical Museum named after Vasyl Vasilyevich Tarnovsky". In 2002, events were held in the building to celebrate the centenary of the opening of the Vasyl Vasilyevich Tarnovsky Museum of Ukrainian Antiquities. On 6 March 2022, during the Siege of Chernihiv, the main building of the museum was damaged, where it sheltered residents during the siege.

== Description ==
The museum preserves many items related to the name of Ivan Mazepa. The museum's collection includes also over 150,000 historical and cultural monuments. These include Cossack jewelry, weapons, military equipment, clothing, church and household utensils, jewelry, and more. Documentary monuments of the Cossack era are represented by 156 universal hetman archives, ancient prints, municipalities, magistrates, and monasteries, archives of judicial institutions, manuscripts, and family archives.

== Transport connections ==
- There are buses from the main Chernihiv–Ovruch railway train station or taxi just outside the museum.
- From Krasna Square and Myru Avenue the museum is about five minutes walking.

== Gallery ==
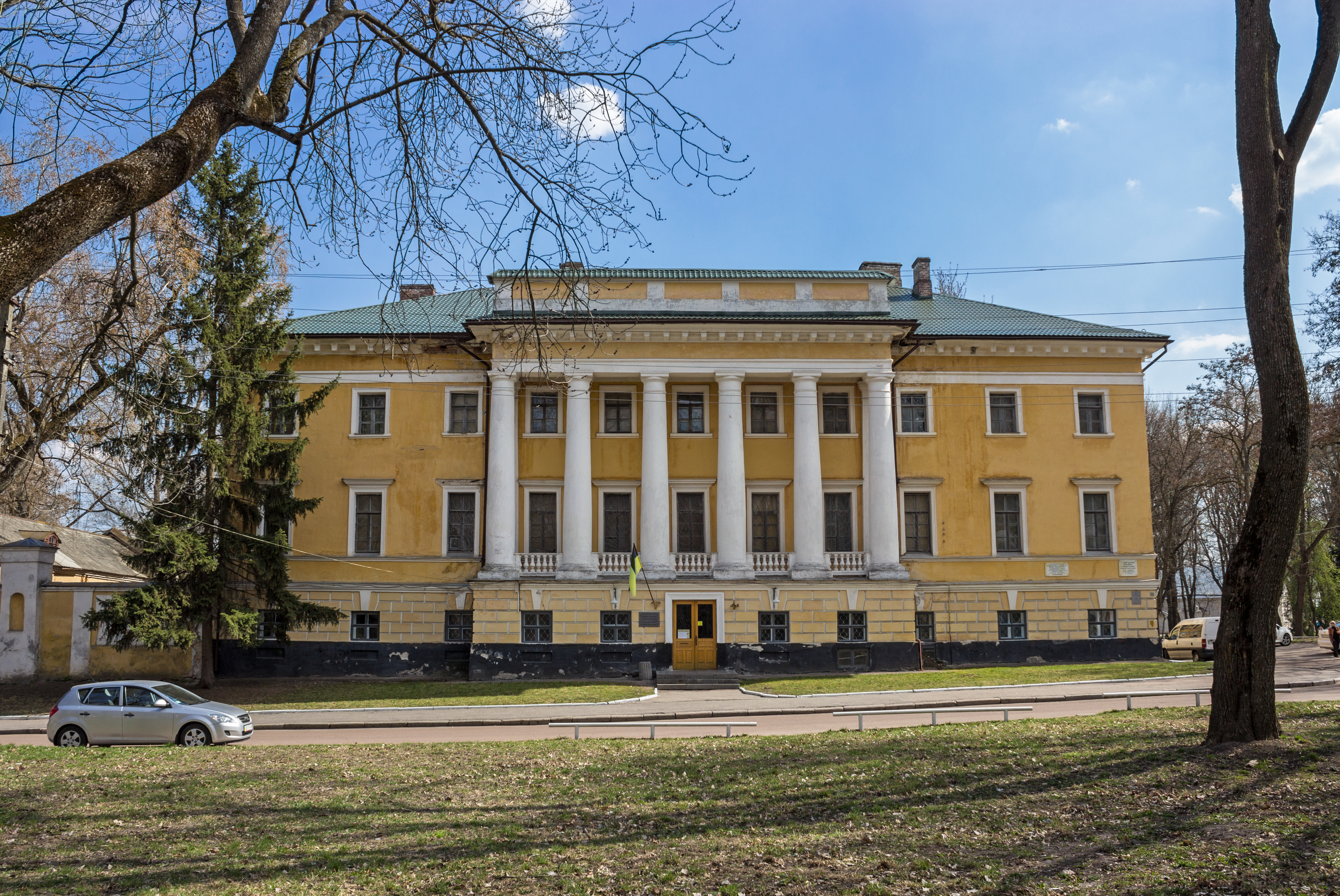
Front View of the Museum

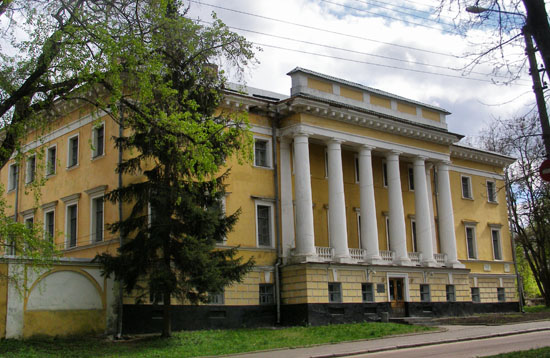
Corner View of the Museum

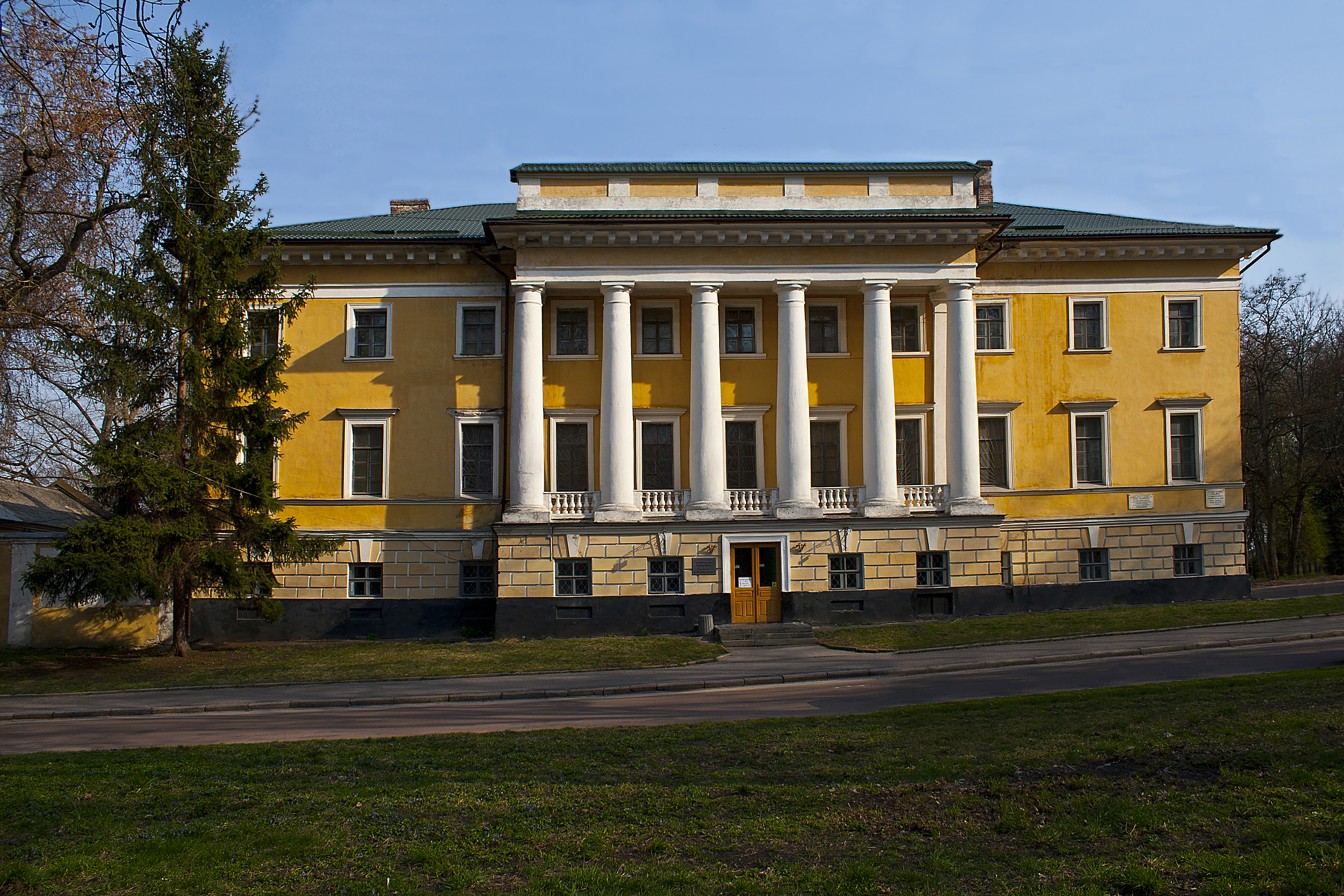
Front View

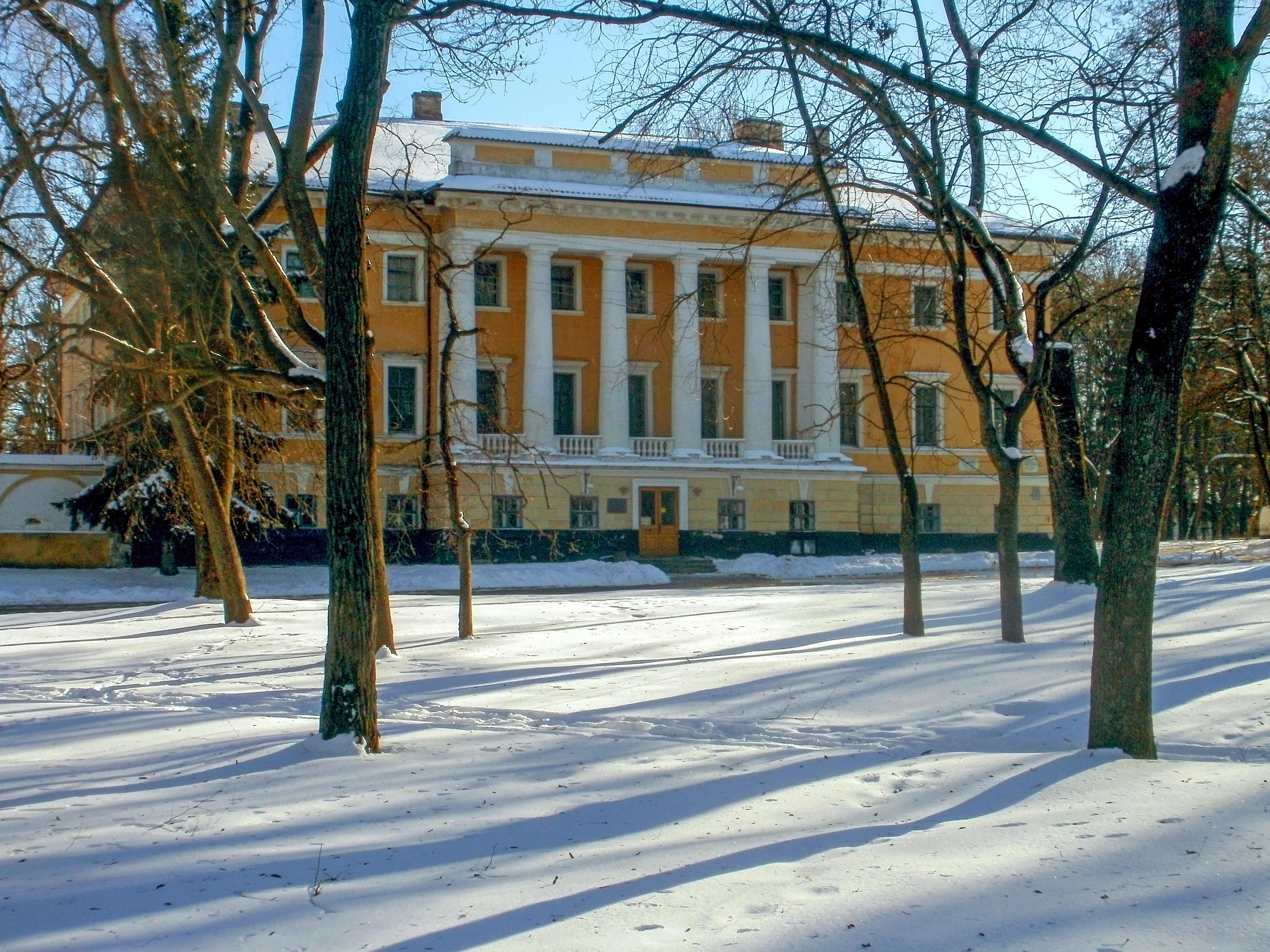
View of the museum snowed

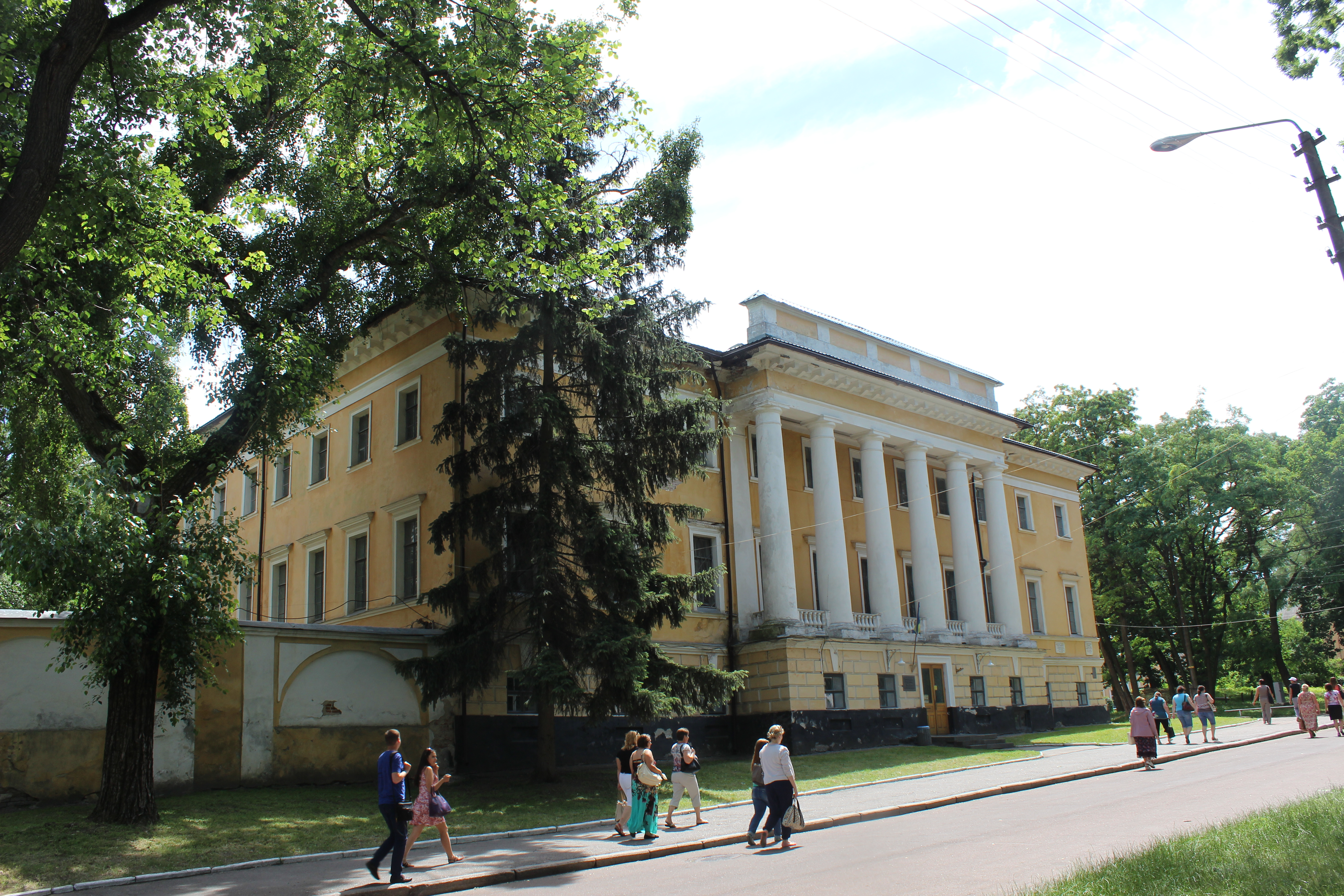
View of the museum from Dytynets Park

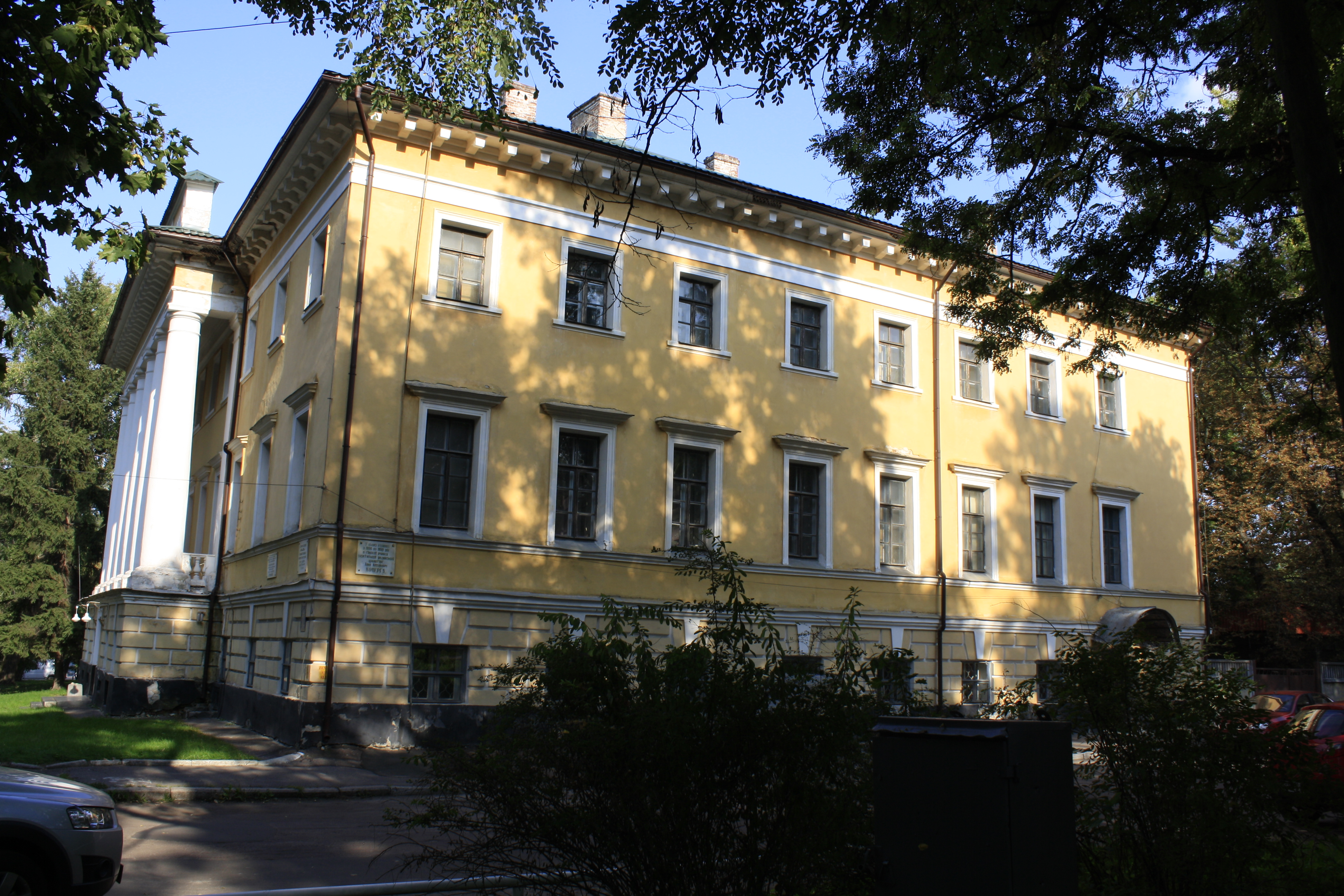
Side View

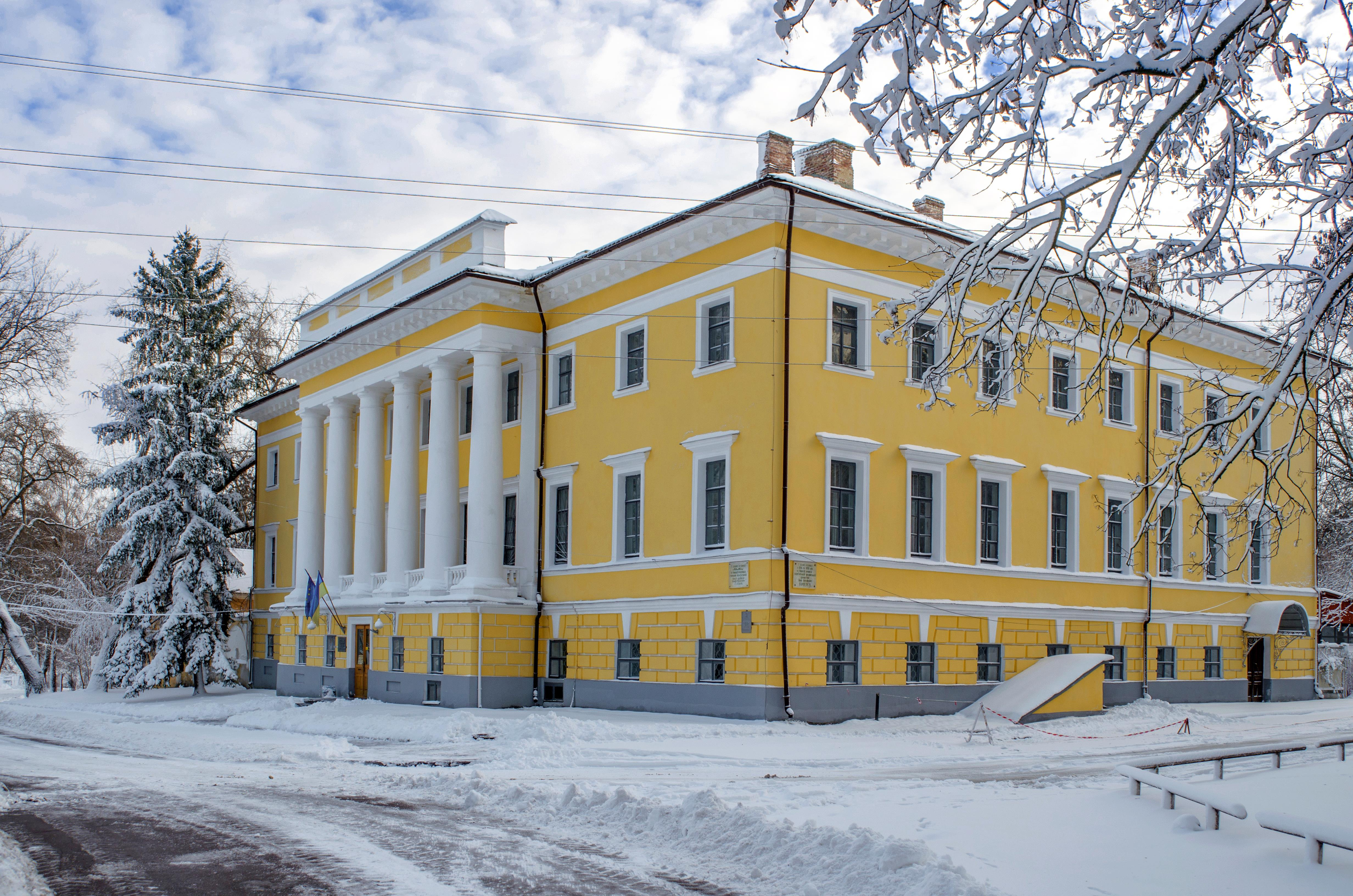

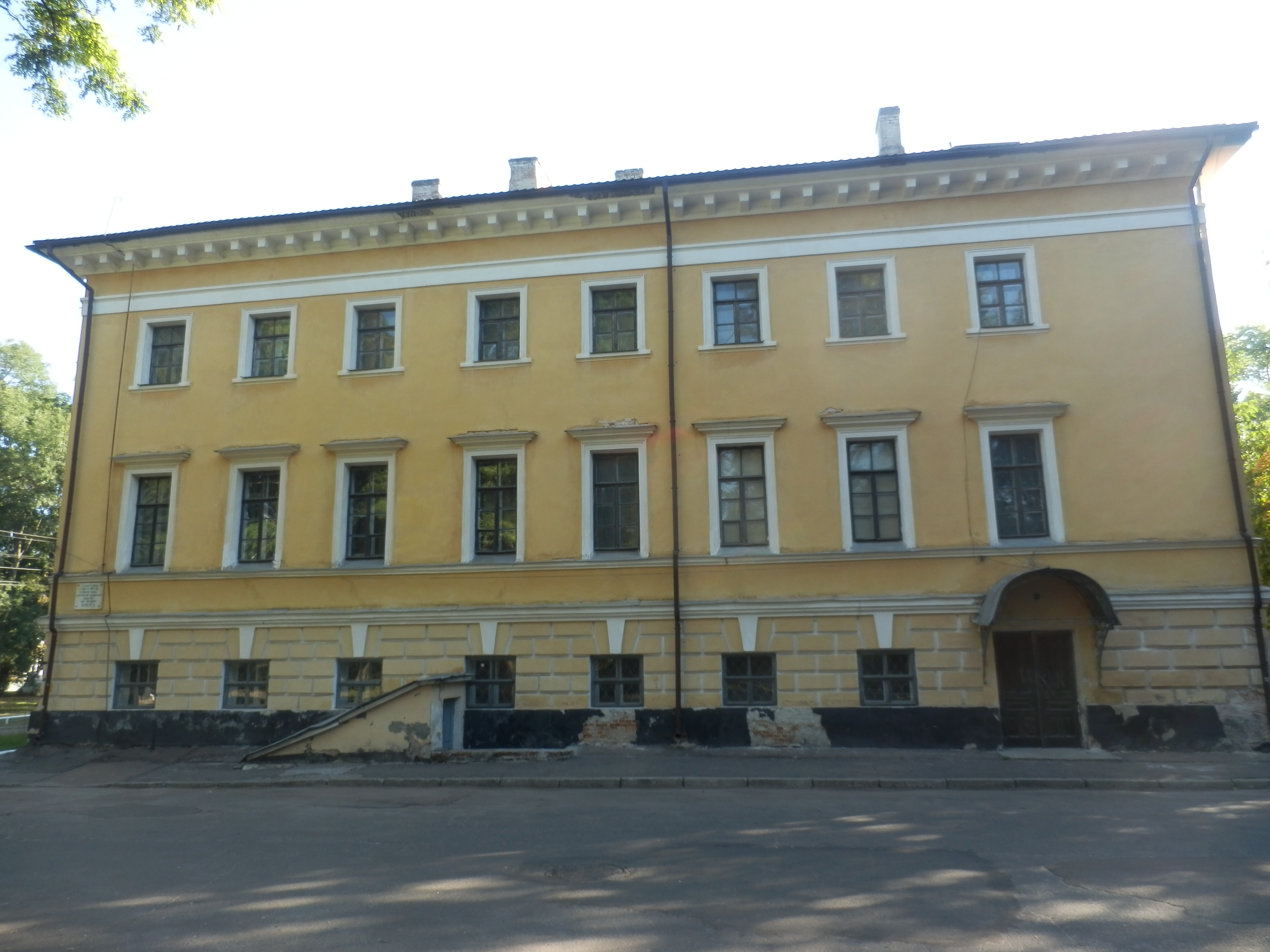

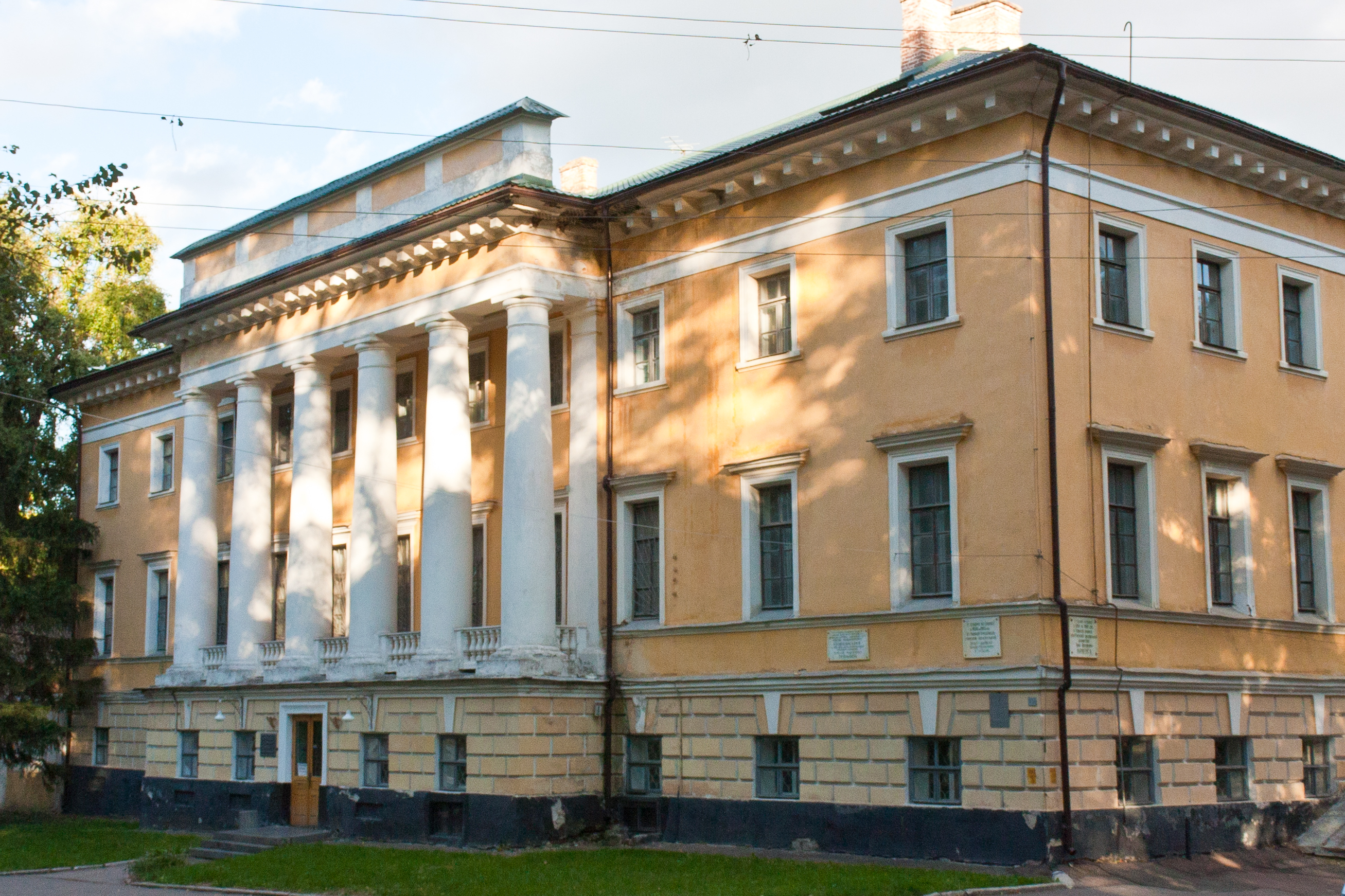
Corner View of the Museum

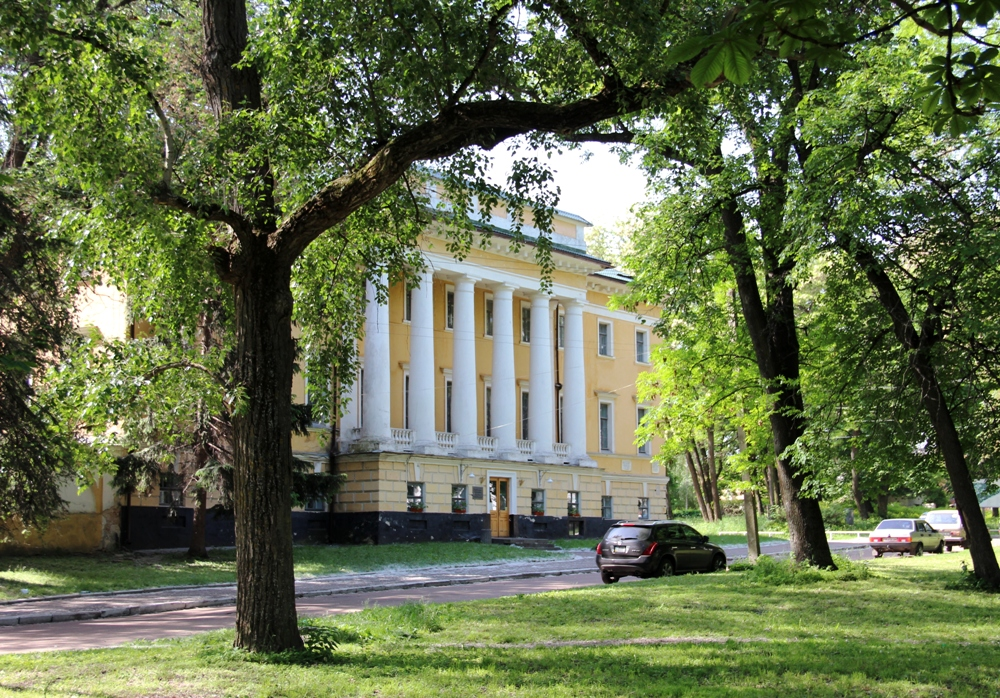

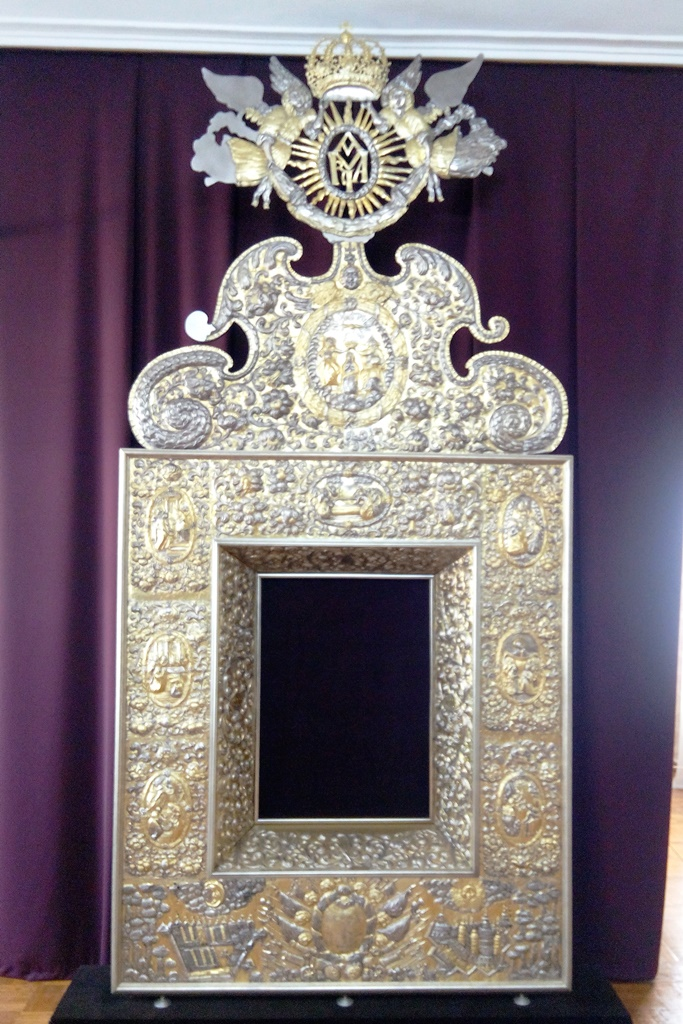
The price of the kiot of the Chernihiv Icon of the Mother of God of Ilyinskaya

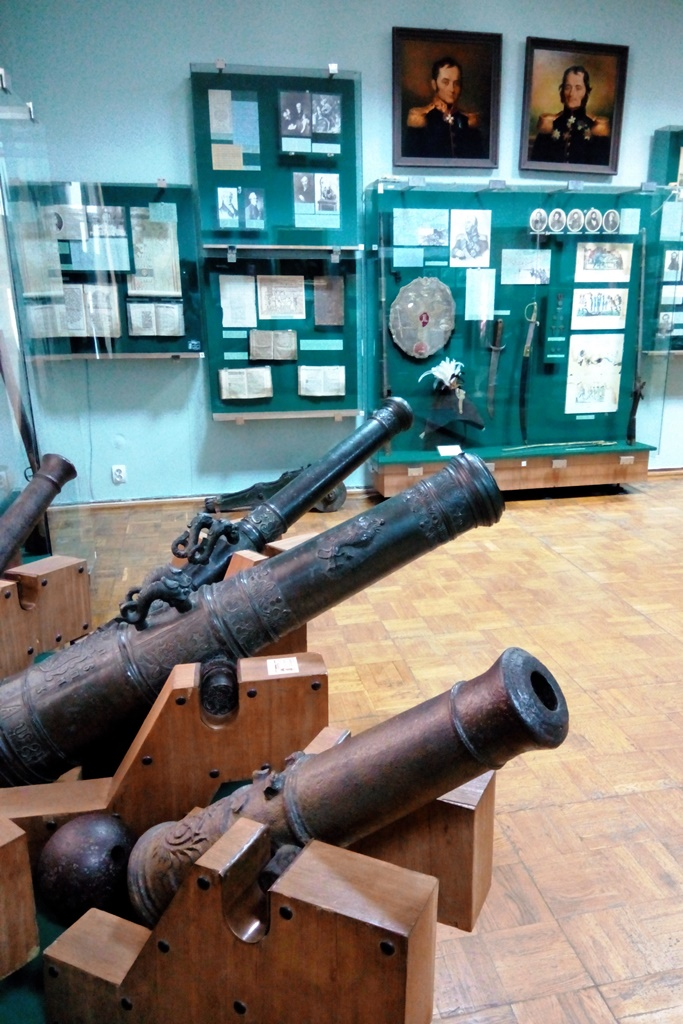
Fragment of the museum's exposition. Cannons of the 17th–18th centuries.

== See also ==
- List of museums in Chernihiv
- List of museums in Ukraine
