= Chernihiv Museum of Ukrainian Antiquities =

- Чернігівська обласна універсальна наукова бібліотека імені В. Г. Короленка
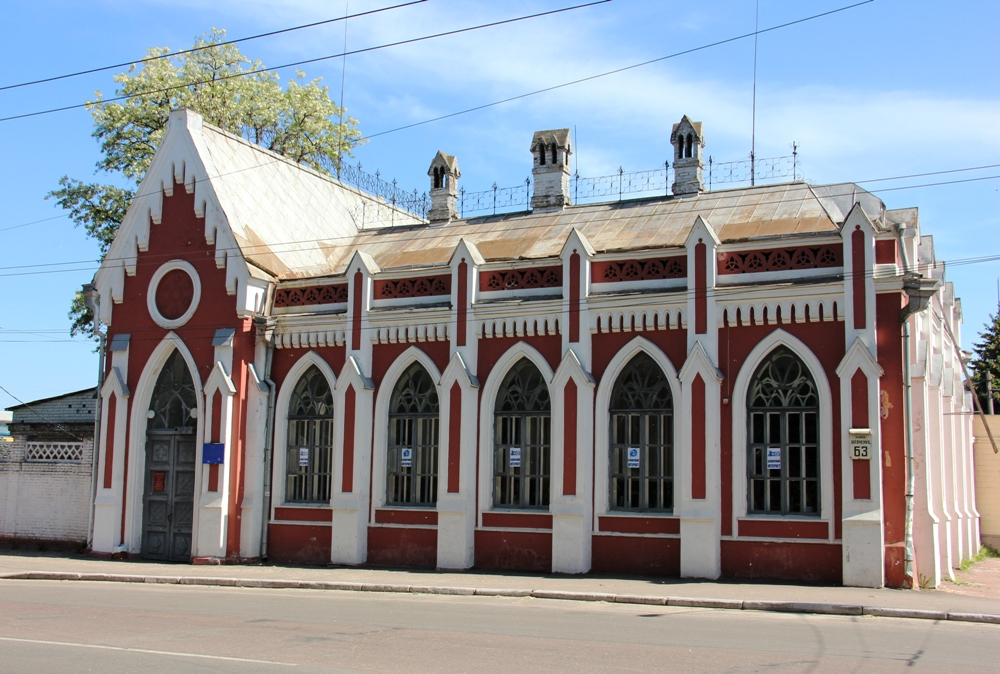
- 51°30′6″N 31°19′38″E
- Location: Shevchenka Street, 63, Chernihiv, 14027 Ukraine, Ukraine
- Established: 1902-1925

Other information
- Website: obucn.org.ua

The Chernihiv Museum of Ukrainian Antiquities (Ukrainian: Чернігівський музей українських старожитностей, romanized: Chernihivskyi muzei ukrainskykh starozhytnostei) is a museum in Chernihiv, which existed in 1902–1925. It is located beside the Chernihiv Stadium on Shevchenka Street, 63.

== History ==
For the needs of the museum in 1900–1901, a building on the outskirts of Chernihiv was rebuilt and reequipped, where the craft class of the orphanage was located. This building is known as the house of V. V. Tarnovsky.

The museum was opened in 1902 by the Chernihiv provincial zemstvo council on the basis of the museum and archival relics of the collection of V. V. Tarnovsky bequeathed to it.

Under Soviet rule, the exhibits of the museum replenished the expositions and funds of the State Taras Shevchenko Museum in Kyiv. The collection of autographs was transferred to the Department of Manuscripts of the Institute of Literature named after T. G. Shevchenko of the Academy of Sciences of the Ukrainian SSR. Other materials are now stored in the Chernihiv Regional Historical Museum named after V. V. Tarnovsky.

Now the house of the former museum houses the Chernihiv Regional Library for Youth.

After the establishment of Soviet rule, the museum was renamed the First Soviet Museum and recognized as an institution of national importance. In 1923-1925 it was merged with other Chernihiv museums into the Chernihiv State Museum.

The museum's exhibits were added to the expositions and funds of the State Museum of Taras Shevchenko in Kyiv (now the National Museum of Taras Shevchenko). The collection of autographs was transferred to the Manuscripts Department of the Taras Shevchenko Institute of Literature of the Academy of Sciences of the Ukrainian SSR. Other materials are now kept in the Chernihiv Regional Historical Museum named after V. Tarnovsky.

The historic building that originally housed the Chernihiv Museum of Ukrainian Antiquities, later serving as the Regional Youth Library, was severely damaged during the 2022 Russian invasion of Ukraine. Reports indicate that the building, a neo-Gothic structure from the early 20th century, was hit on March 11, 2022 by Russian forces as part of the Russian invasion of Ukraine.

== Description ==
The most valuable part of V. V. Tarnovsky's collection was Shevchenkiada, which consisted of 758 exhibits. Among them are 18 original letters from Taras Shevchenko, about 30 autographs of works (in particular, "Schodennik"), over 20 personal documents of the poet. The collection included more than 80 letters and records about Shevchenko's funeral, his personal belongings (an easel, a palette, painting and engraving equipment, a chair, a bottle, a shirt, etc.), a death mask and a finger with his hair, about 400 works by Shevchenko (among them there are 285 drawings and paintings, two albums with 50 watercolors, 38 engravings), 200 examples of Shevchenko's iconography, a collection of publications of his works and publications about him (248 items). In 1907, the museum received the poet's autographs from the archives of the "Third Department", among them the manuscript collection - "Three Lita" ("Three Summers").

== Transport connections ==
- There are many connection to the stadium from Krasna Square that stop just beside the stadium.
- There are buses from the main Chernihiv–Ovruch railway train station or taxi just outside the station.

== Gallery ==
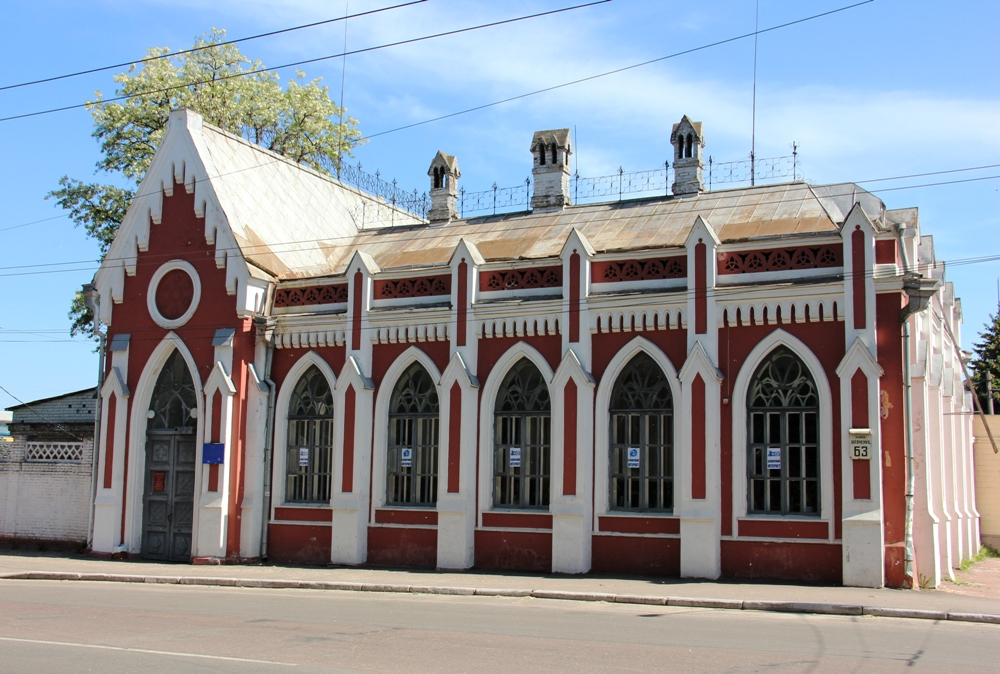
Front View

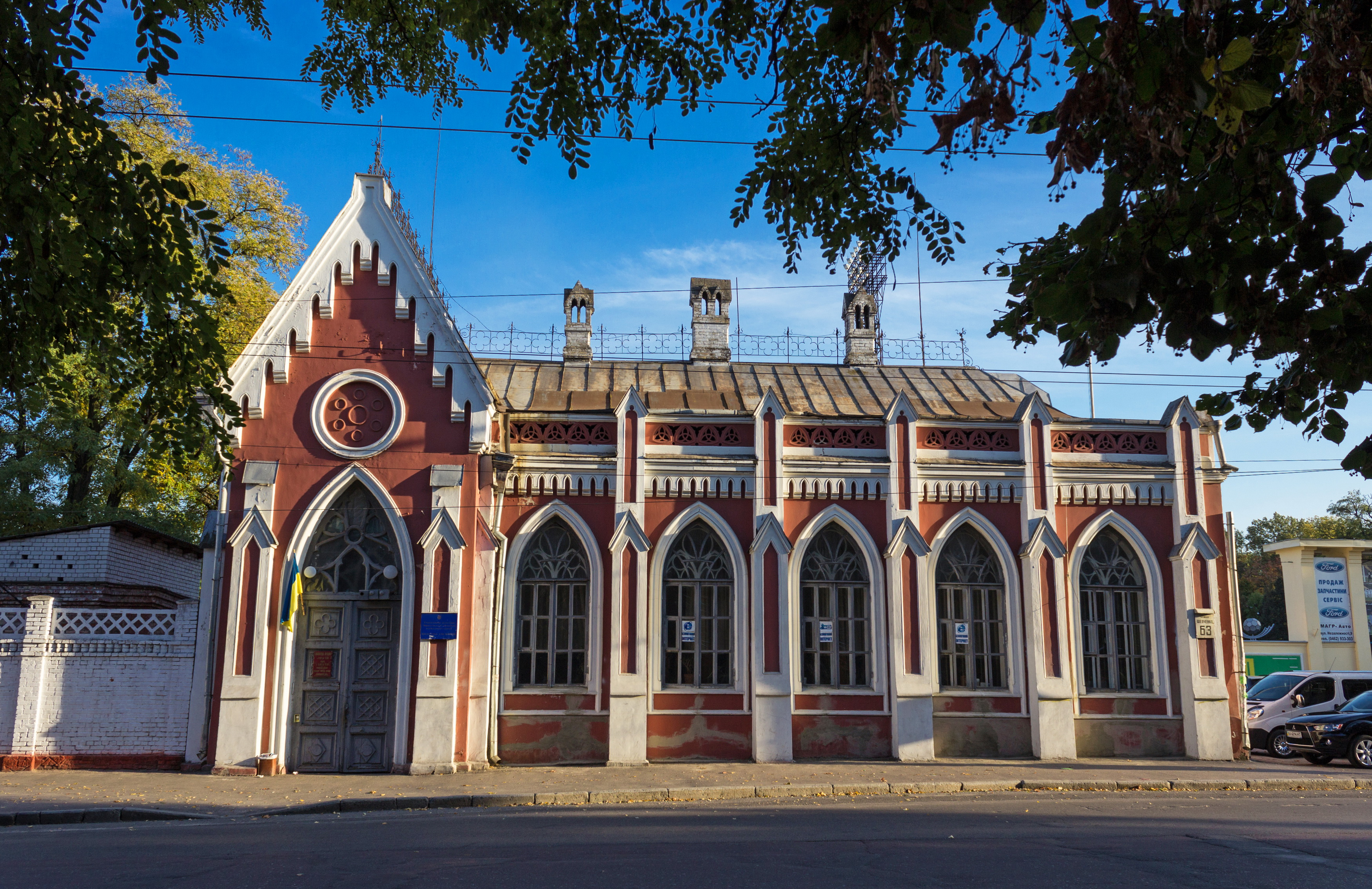
Front View

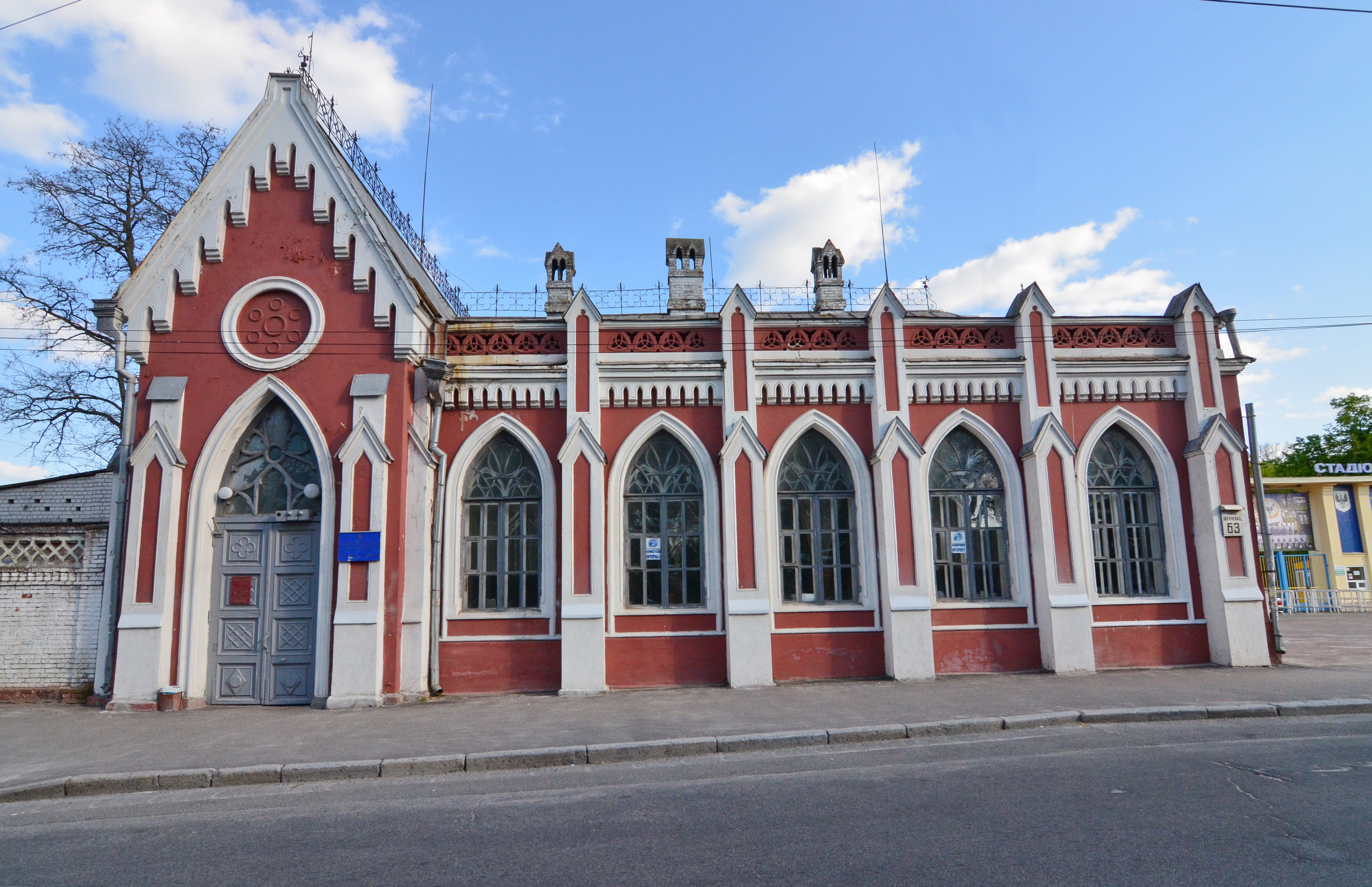
Front View

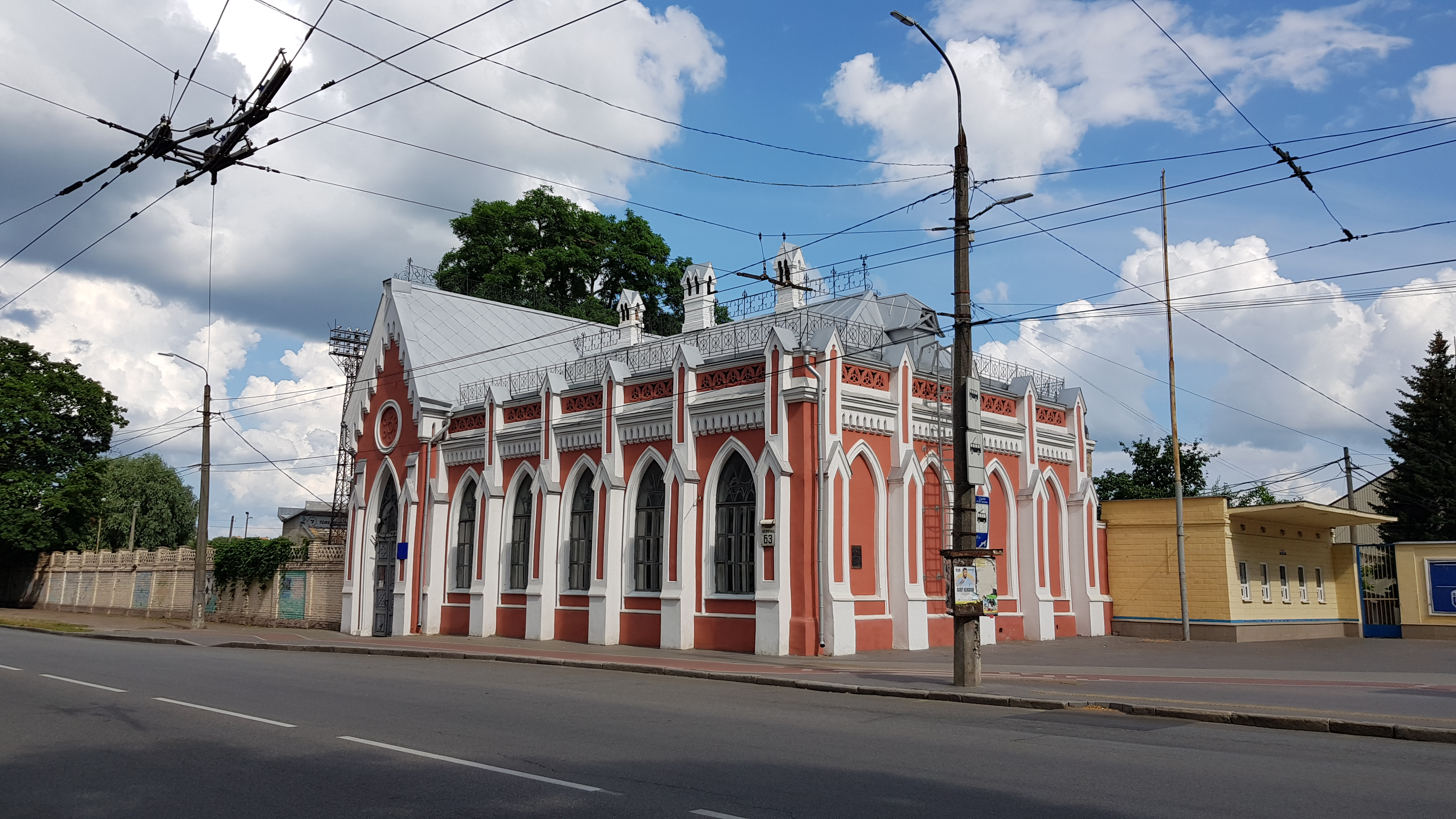
Side View

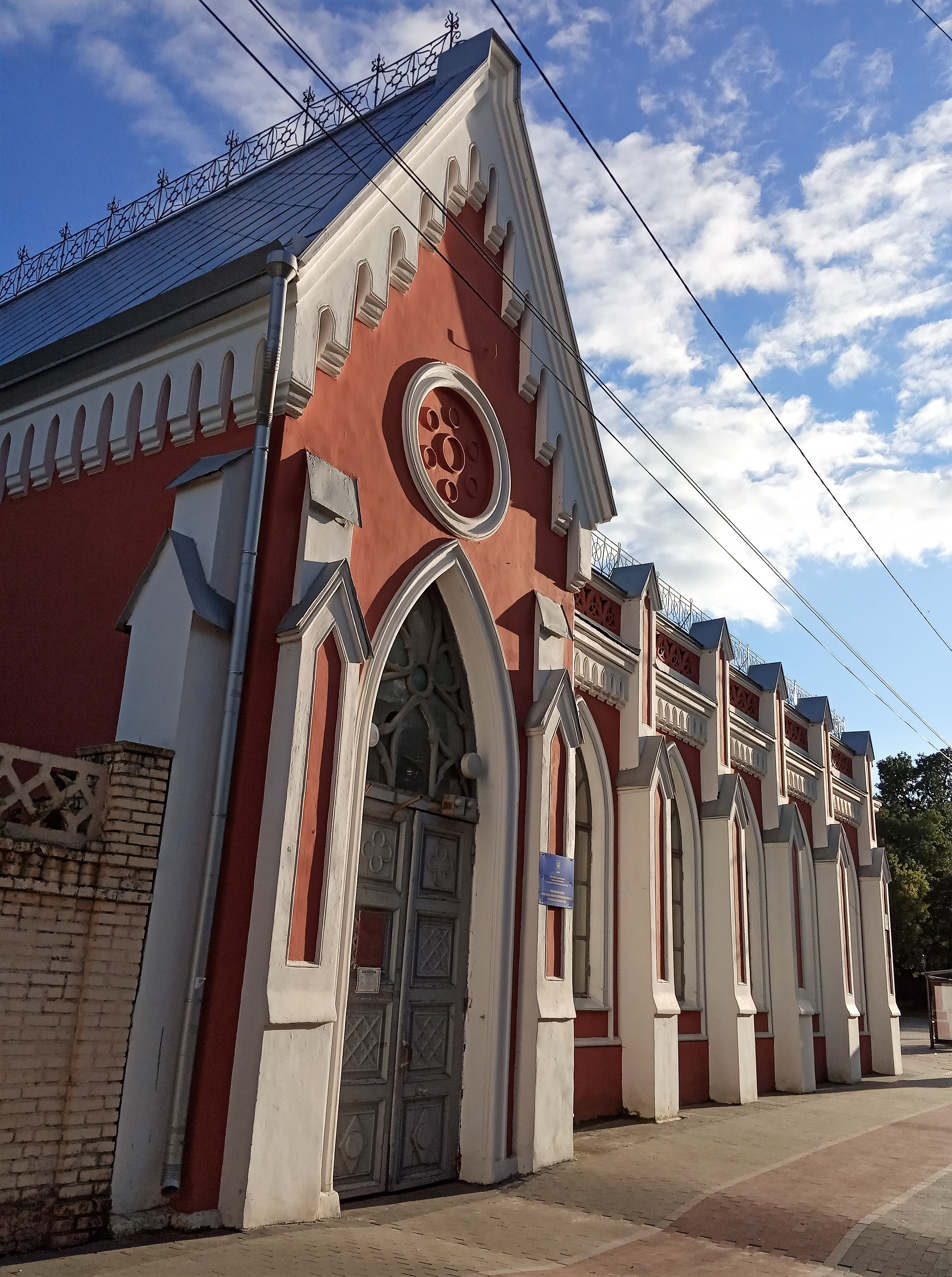
Historic building in 2021

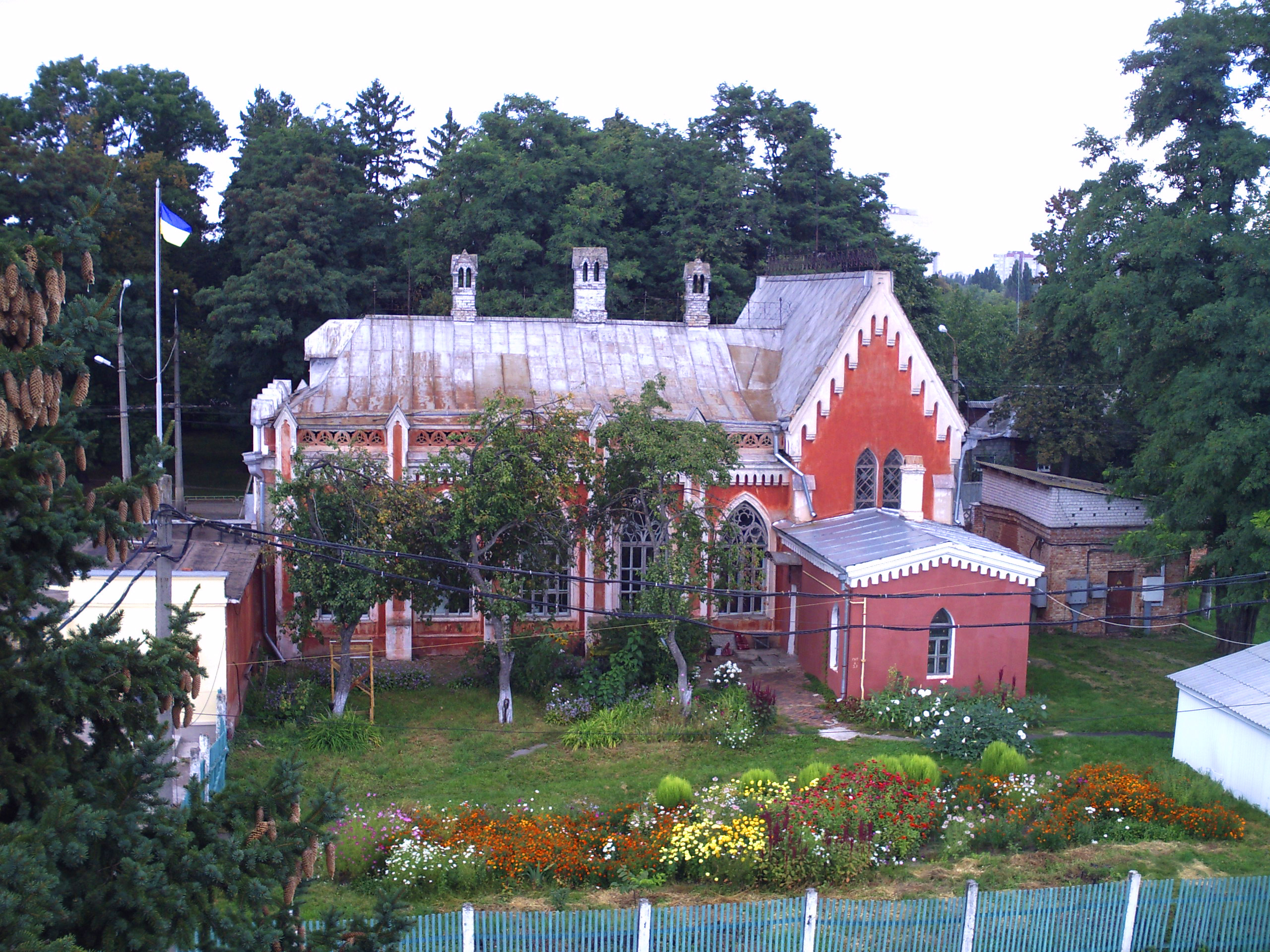
Rear part and gardens of the house.

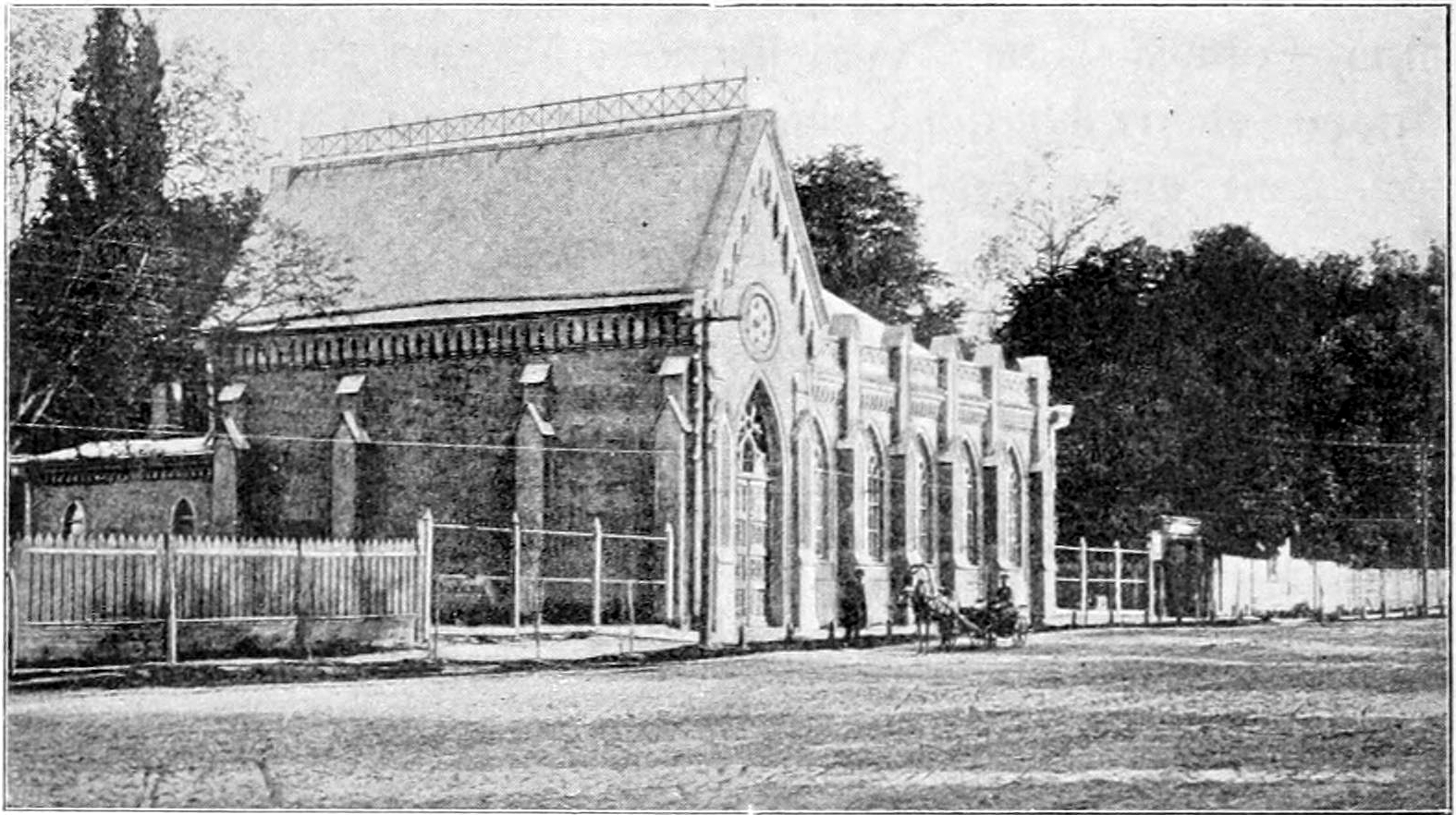
Museum of Ukrainian Antiquities in Chernihiv in an early 20th century image

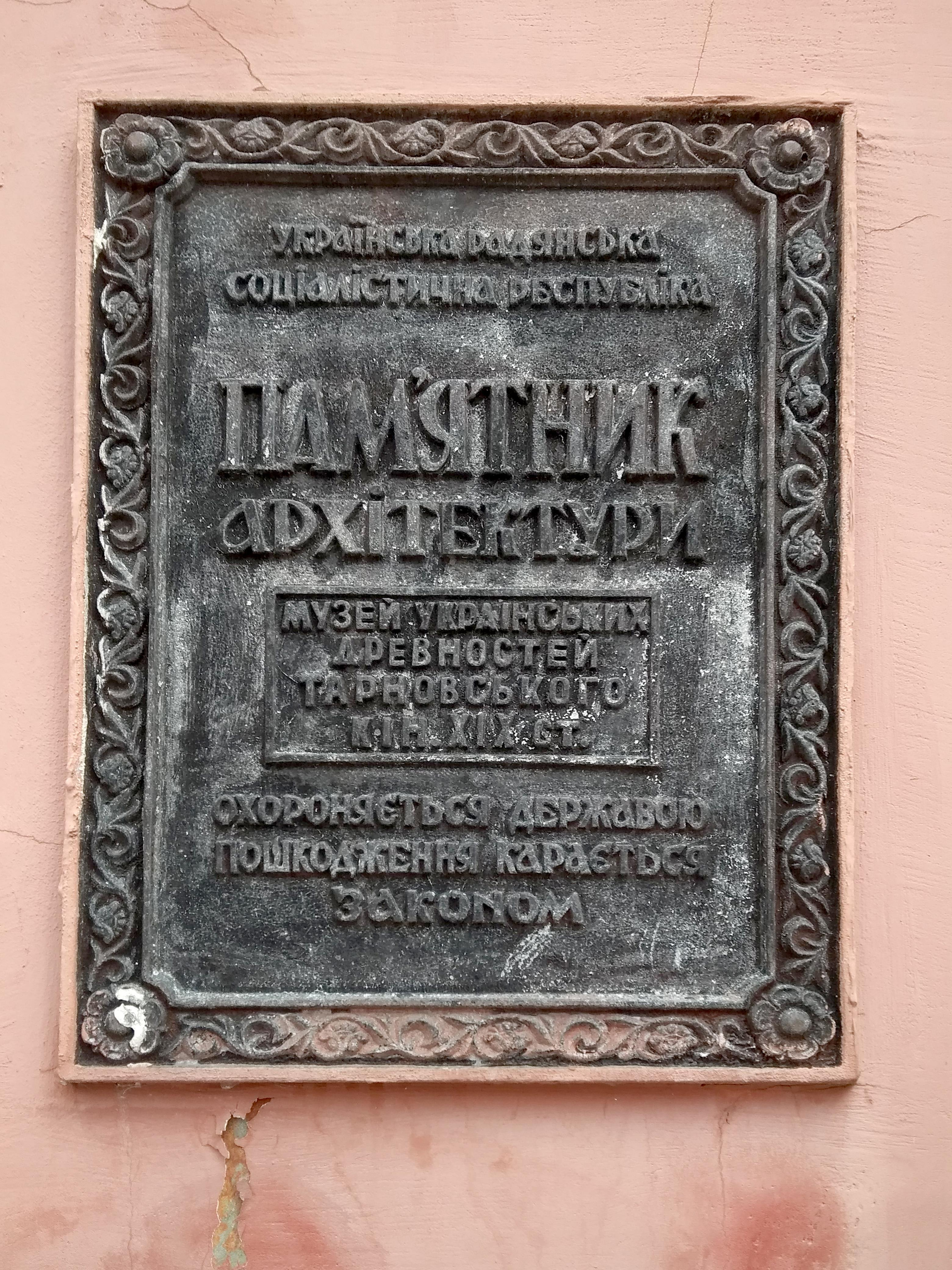
Plaque on the facade

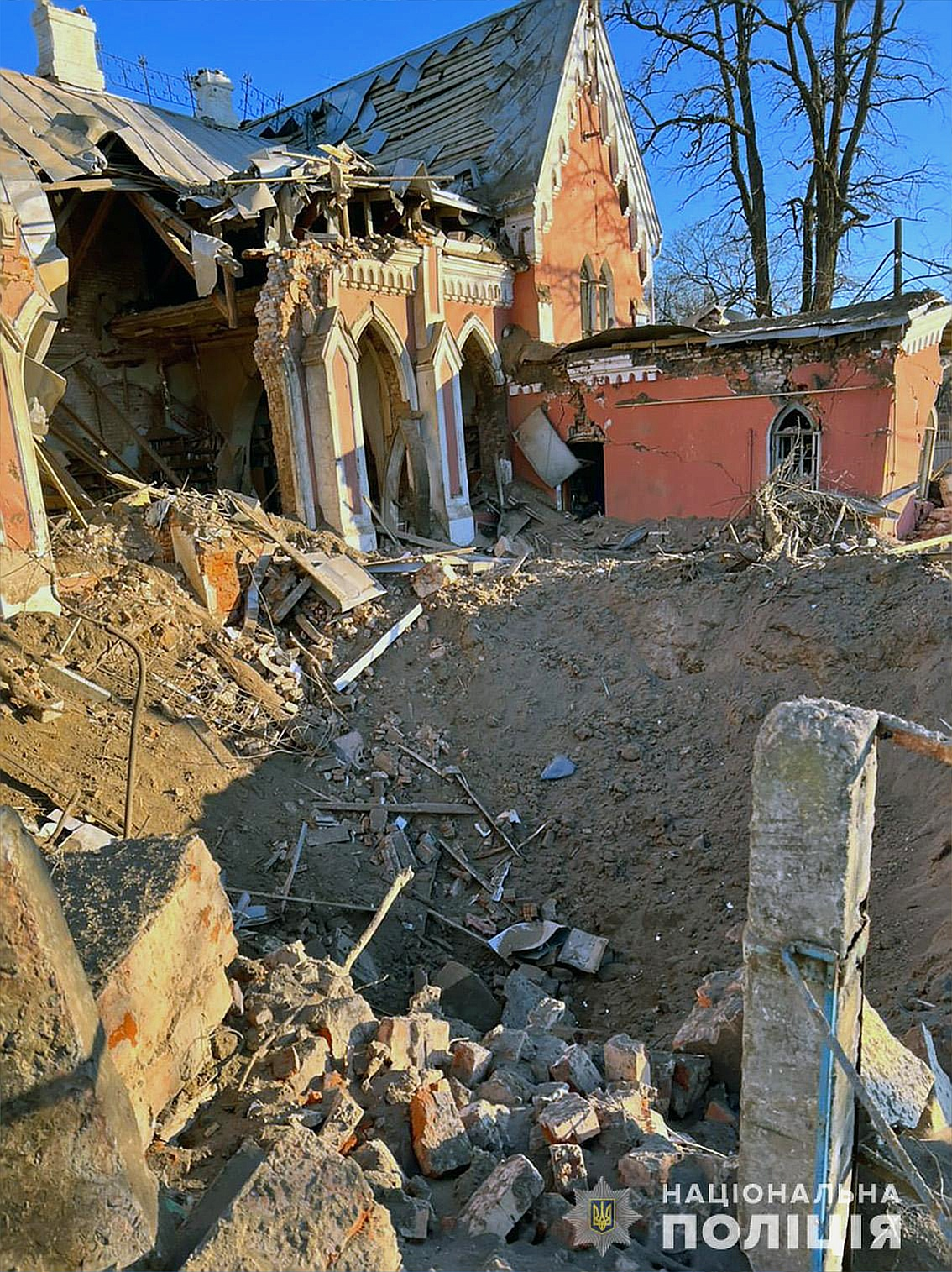
After the Bombing (2022)

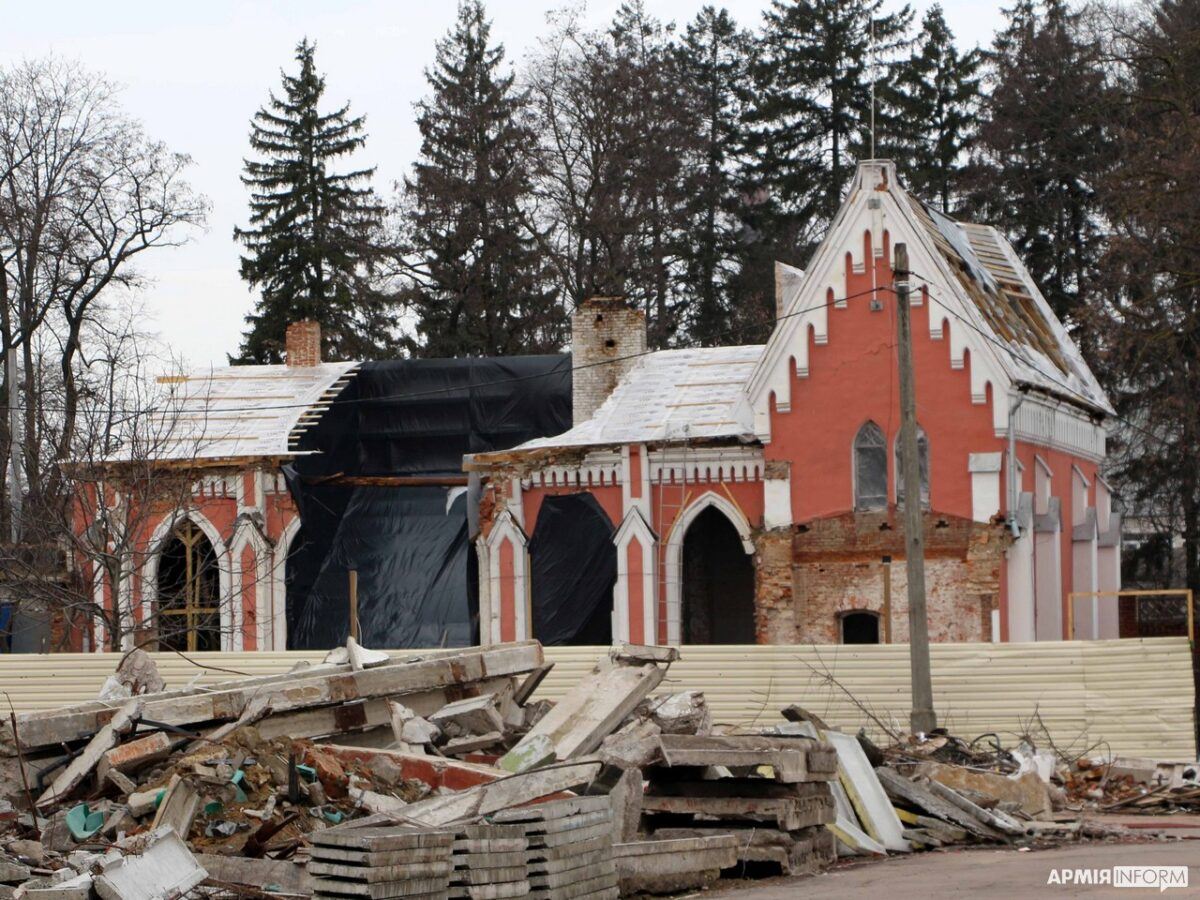
Museum building after the destruction in 2022

== See also ==
- List of museums in Chernihiv
- List of museums in Ukraine
