= List of art museums and galleries in Ukraine =

Art museums and galleries in Ukraine

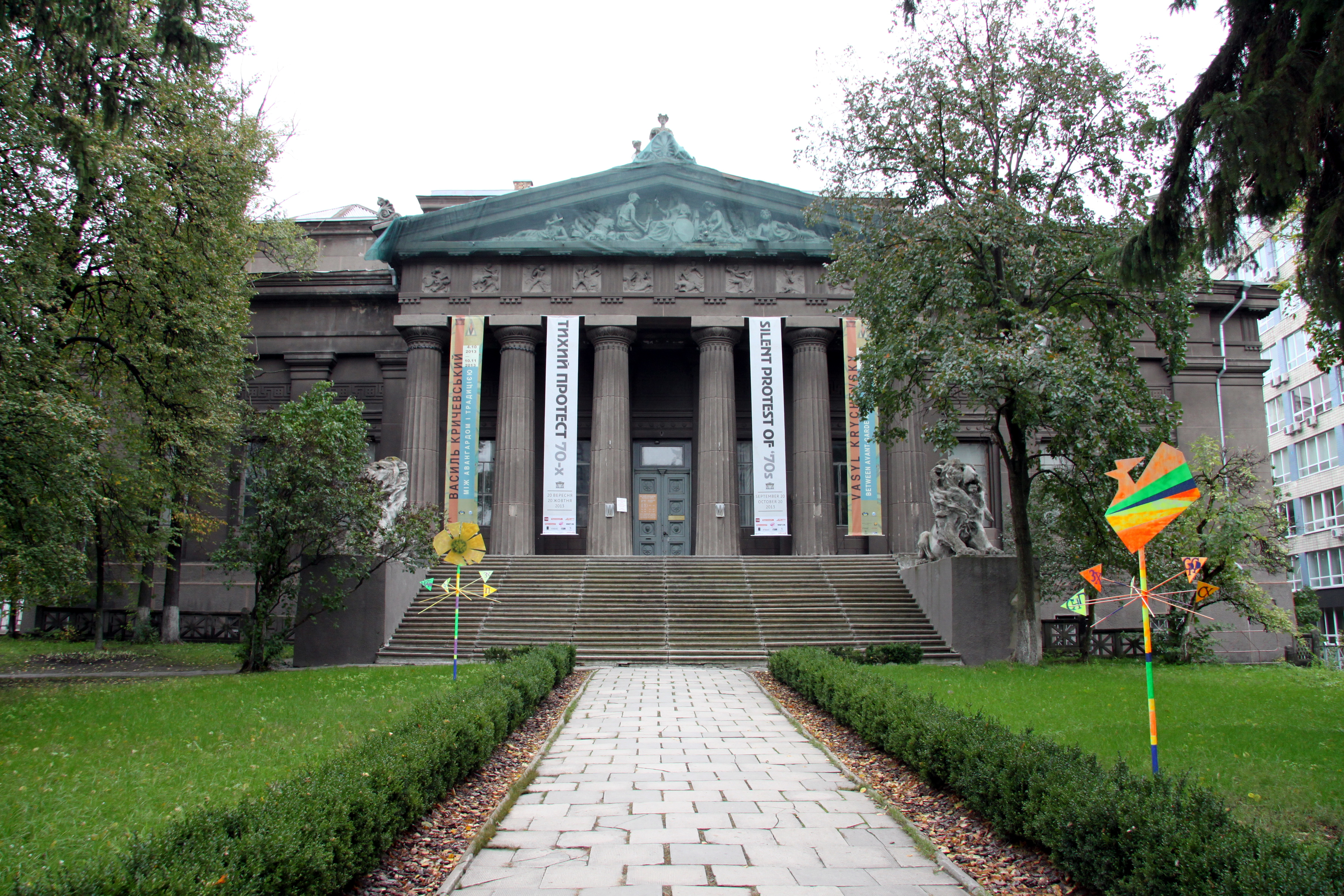
National Art Museum of Ukraine

This is a list of currently existing art museums, museums of fine arts, and art galleries in Ukraine, arranged in accordance with the current administrative division of the state. The list includes mainly state museums. Many of these museums are at risk due to the 2022 Russian invasion of Ukraine.

Museums within sections by region or administration are presented in the following sequence: first, state museum institutions in the administrative center of the region. Departments or branches of the previously specified institution are marked with (**).

See also the list of museums in Ukraine, which replicates much, but not all, of this material.

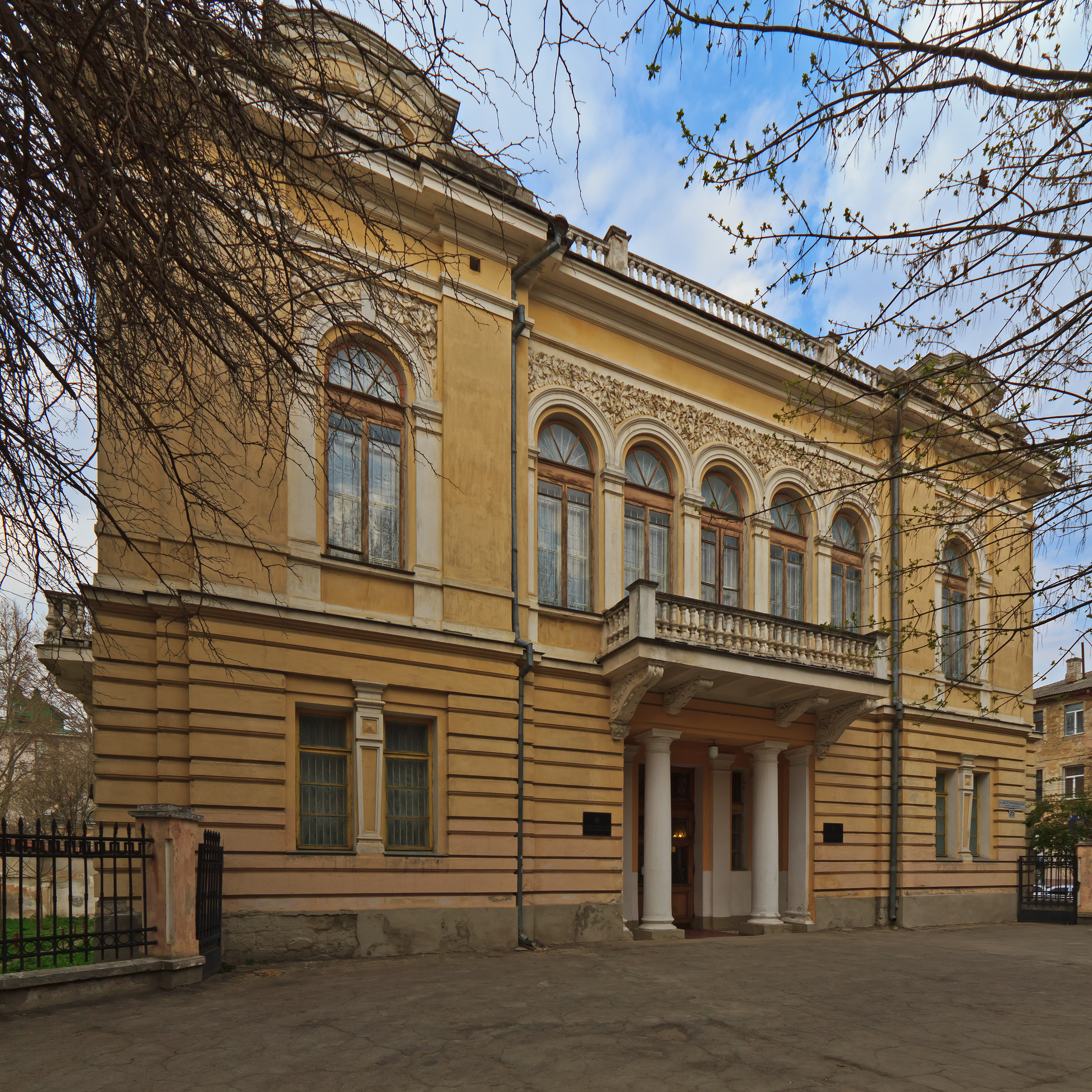
Simferopol Art Museum

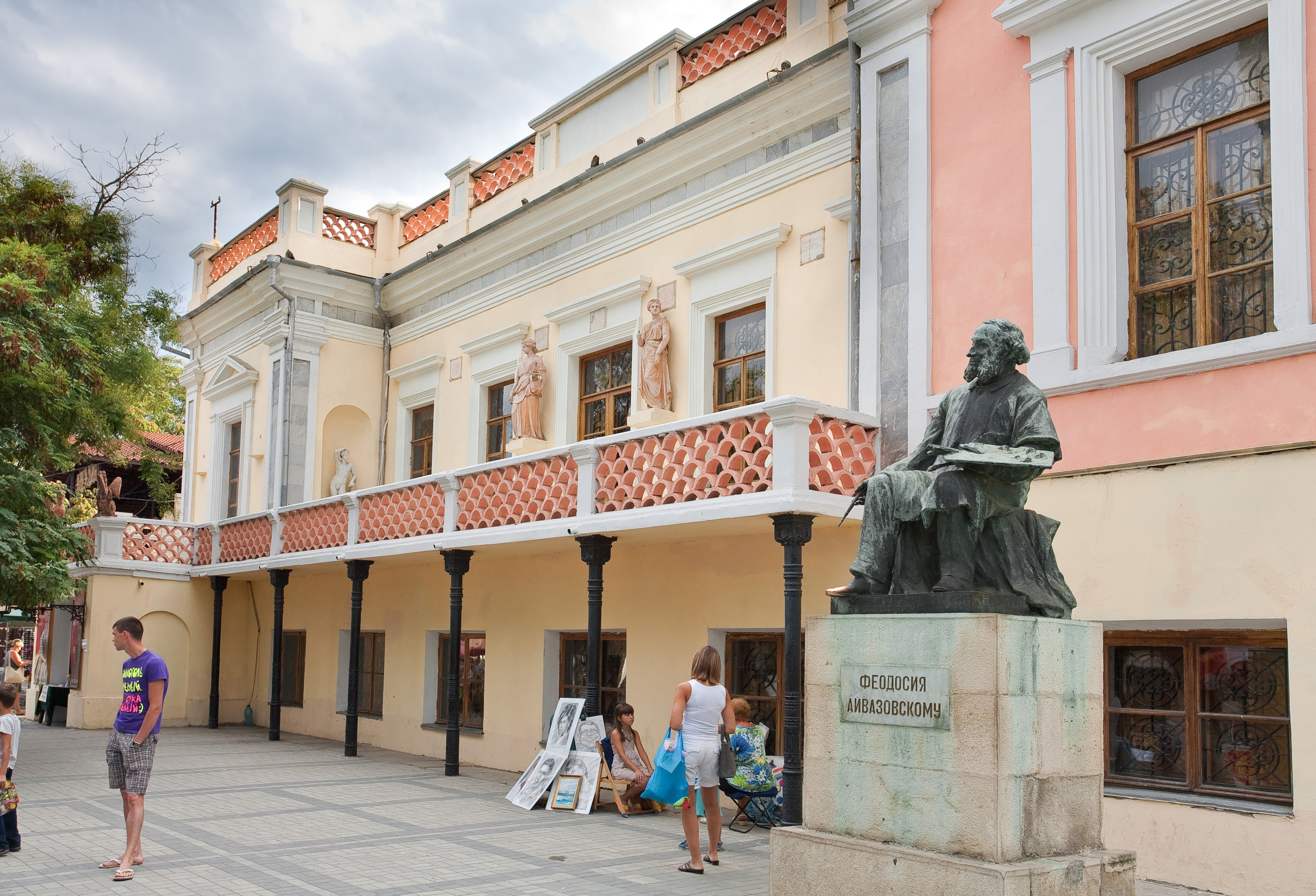
The Aivazovsky National Art Gallery in Feodosia

== Autonomous Republic of Crimea ==
- Simferopol Art Museum
- Mikhail Kroshitsky Sevastopol Art Museum
- Aivazovsky National Art Gallery
- Art Gallery in Kerch (Department of the Kerch State Historical and Cultural Reserve)
- Museum of Vera Mukhina

== Cherkasy Oblast ==
- Cherkasy Art Museum
- Uman Art Gallery (Department of Uman Local Lore)
- Korsun-Shevchenkivska Art Gallery

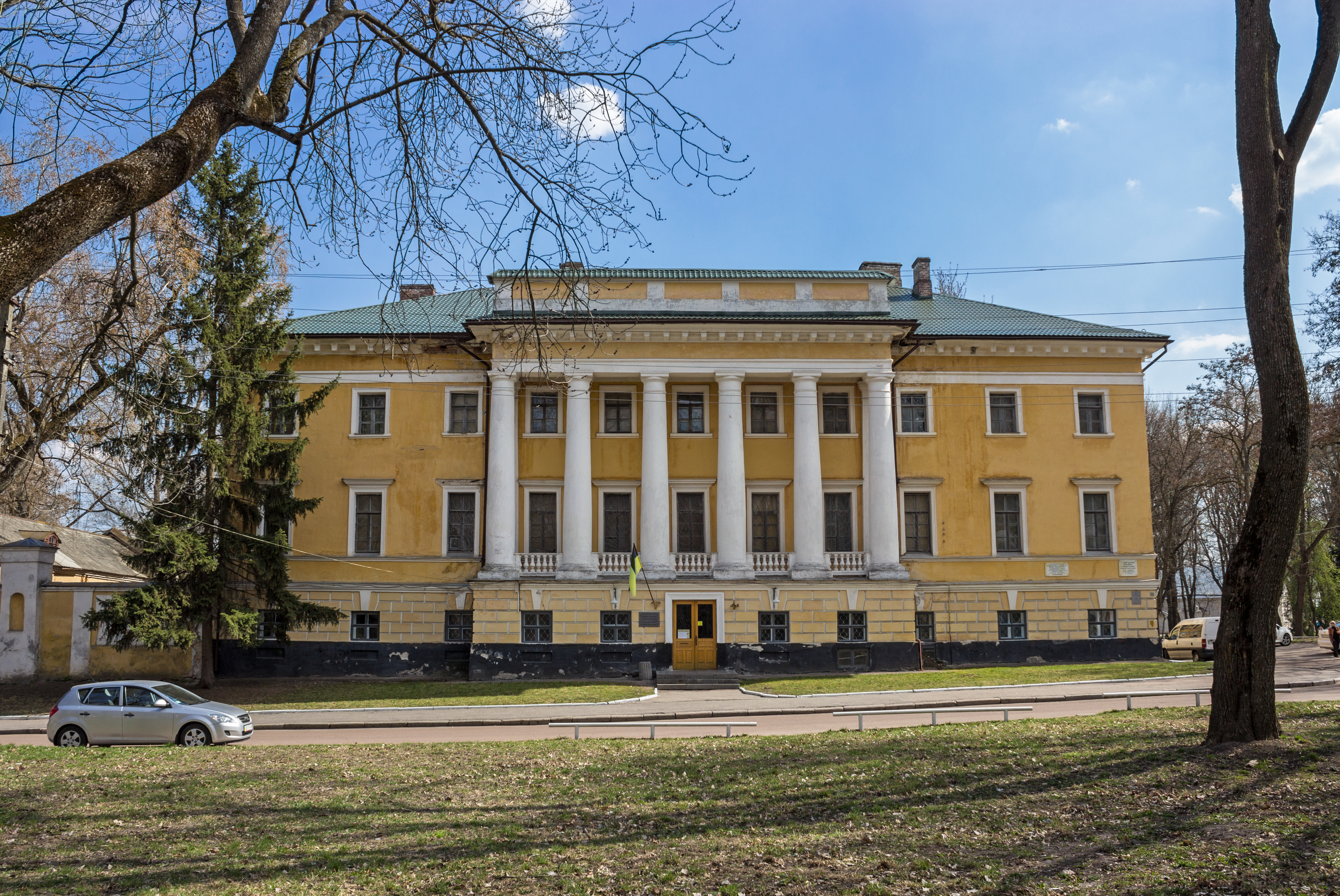
Chernihiv Regional Art Museum

== Chernihiv Oblast ==
- Chernihiv Regional Art Museum
  - Art gallery in the village of Lemeshi (Chernihiv Raion)
- Borzna Art Memorial Museum "Estate of the People's Artist of Ukraine O. Saenko," Borzna

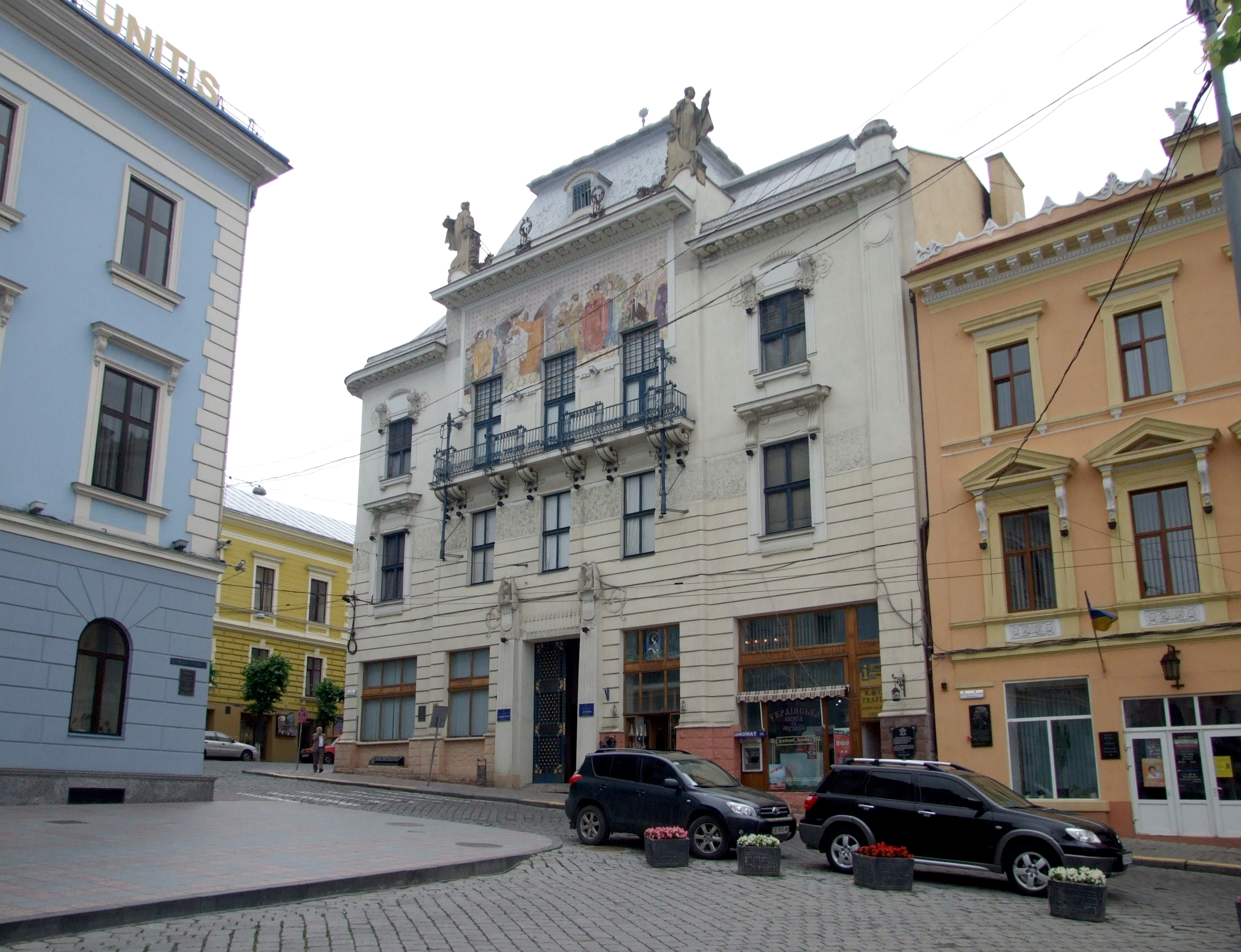
Chernivtsi Regional Art Museum, Chernivtsi

== Chernivtsi Oblast ==
- Chernivtsi Regional Art Museum

== Dnipropetrovsk Oblast ==
- Dnipro Art Museum

== Donetsk Oblast ==
- Donetsk Art Museum
- Makyvsky Museum of Art and Local Lore
- Druzhkivsky Art Museum
- Kramatorsky Art Museum
- Gorlivsky Art Museum
- Kuindzhi Art Museum, Mariupol
- Exhibition hall named after A. I. Kuindzhi (branch of the Mariupol Museum of Local Lore)

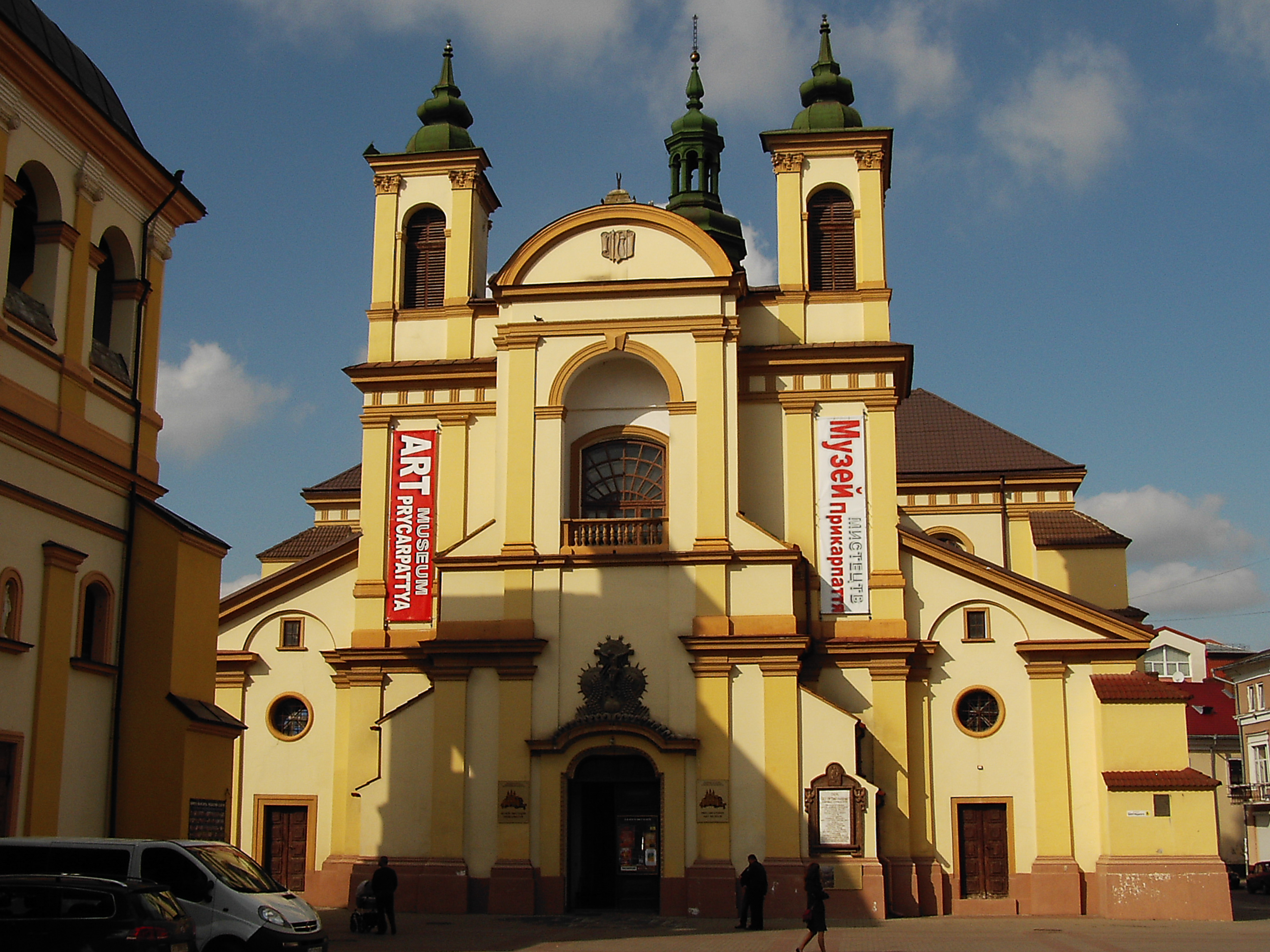
The Ivano-Frankivsk Regional Art Museum in Prykarpattia

== Ivano-Frankivsk Oblast ==
- Art Museum of Prykarpattia (Ivano-Frankivsk Regional Art Museum) – 8 Maydan Sheptytsʹkoho, Ivano-Frankivsk
- Rogatynsky Museum of Art and Local Lore
- Pysanka Museum, Kolomyia

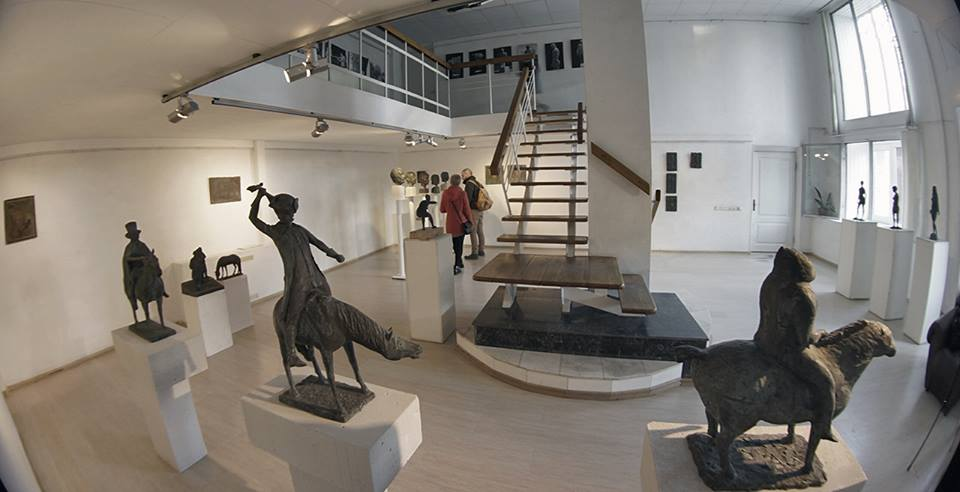
Kharkiv Municipal Gallery

== Kharkiv Oblast ==
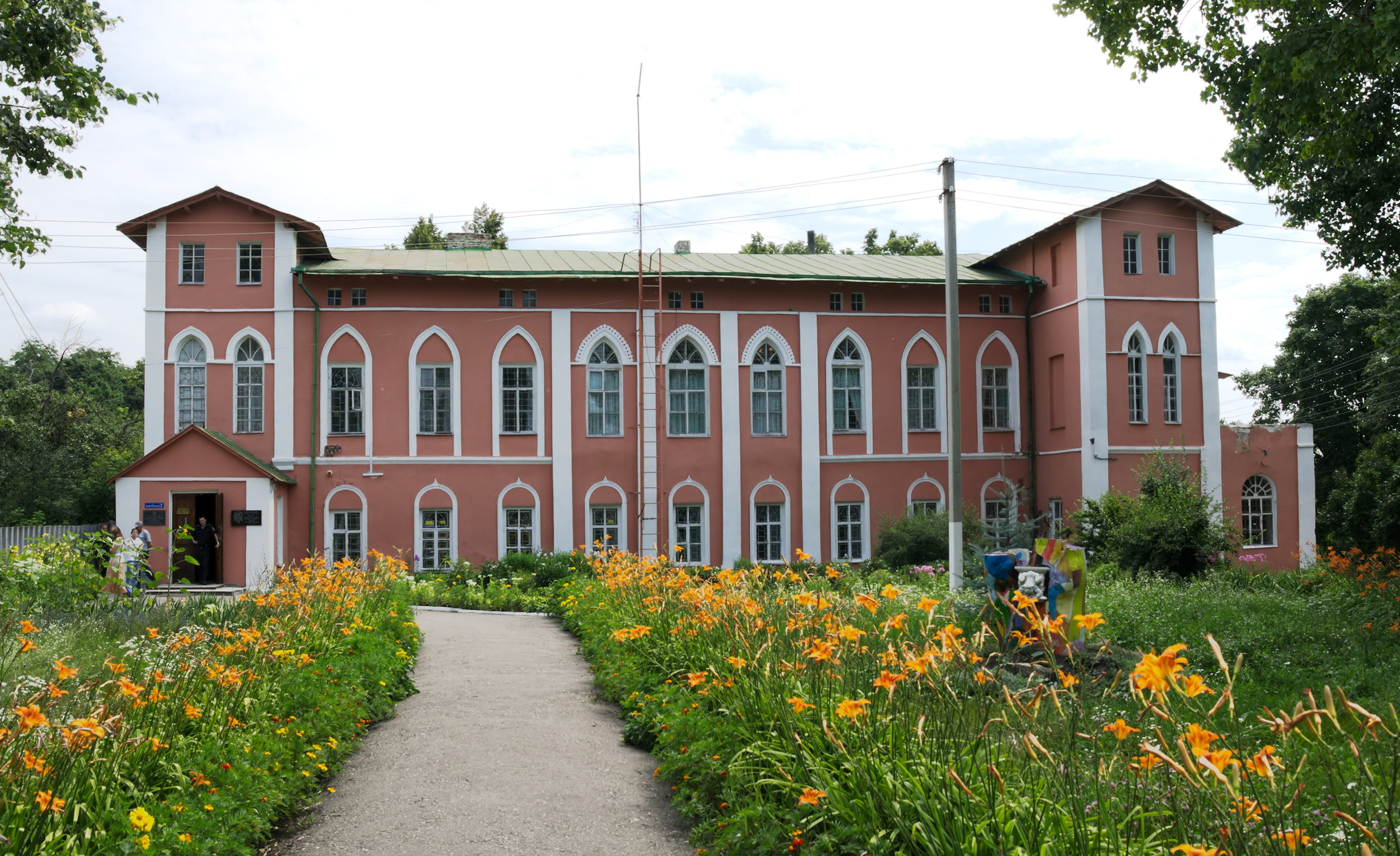
Parkhomivsky Historical Art Museum

- Kharkiv Art Museum
- Museum of Folk Art, Kharkiv
- Parkhomivsky Historical Art Museum
- "Laureates of the I. Repin Prize" Gallery, Chuguiv
- Kharkiv Municipal Gallery
- I. Repin Chuguiv Historical and Cultural Reserve

== Kherson Oblast ==
- Oleksii Shovkunenko Kherson Art Museum
- Novokakhovska Art Gallery

== Khmelnytskyi Oblast ==
- Khmelnytsky Art Museum
- Art Gallery (Kamyanets-Podilsky State Historical and Cultural Museum)

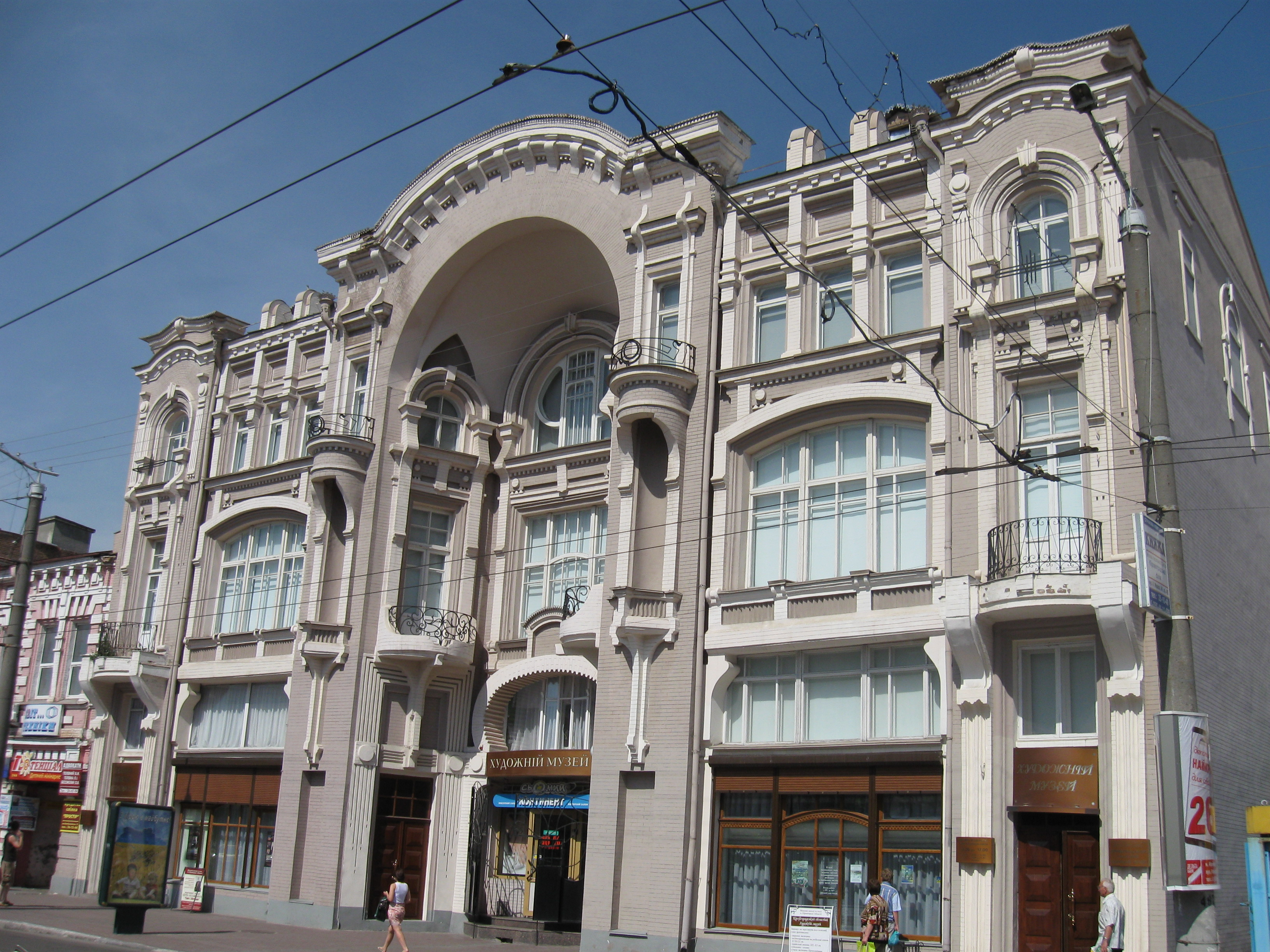
Kirovohrad Regional Art Museum

== Kirovohrad Oblast ==
- Kirovohrad Regional Art Museum
- O. O. Osmorkin Memorial Art Museum

== Kyiv Oblast ==
- Yagotynska Art Gallery

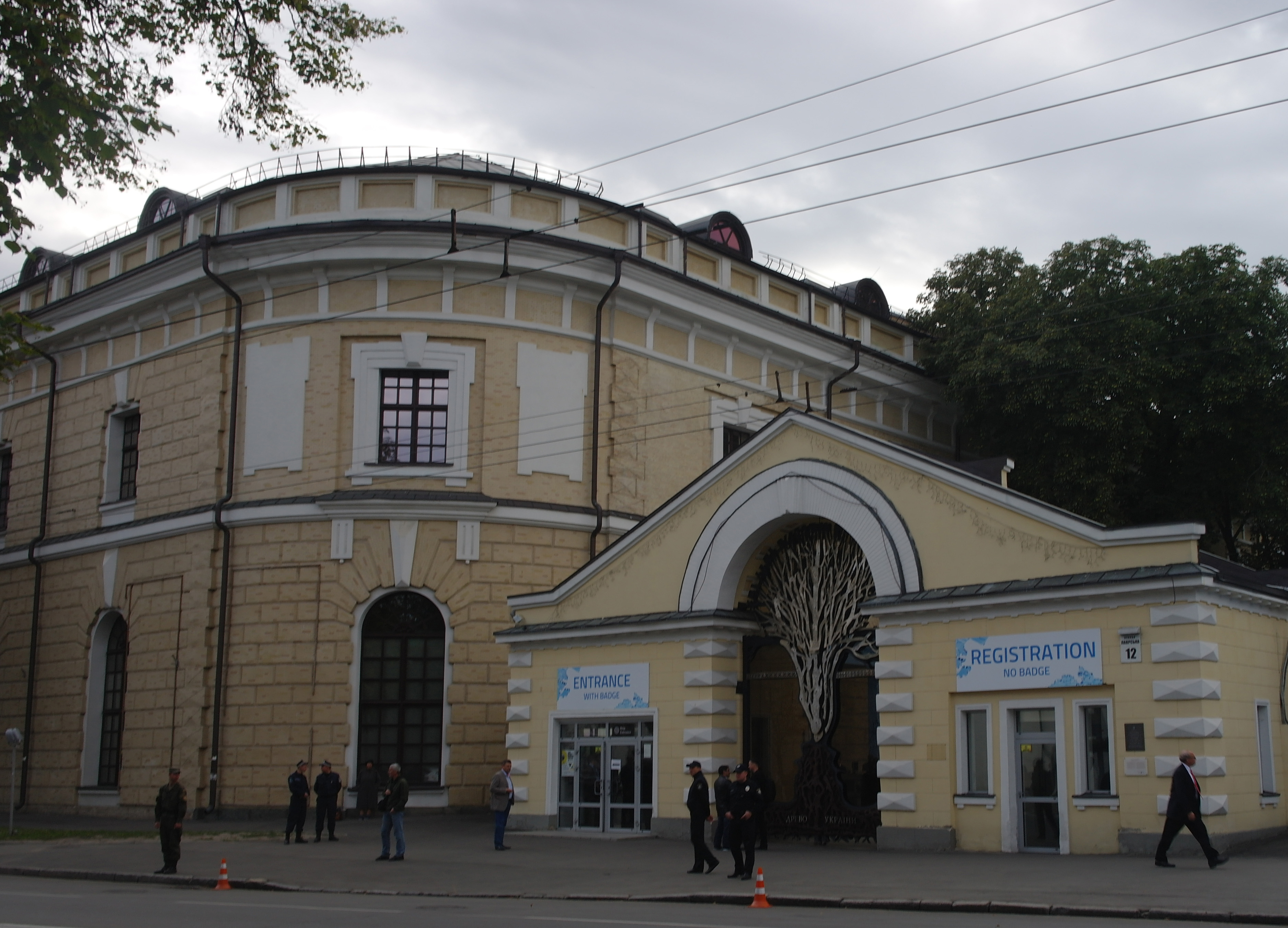
Mystetskyi Arsenal, Kyiv

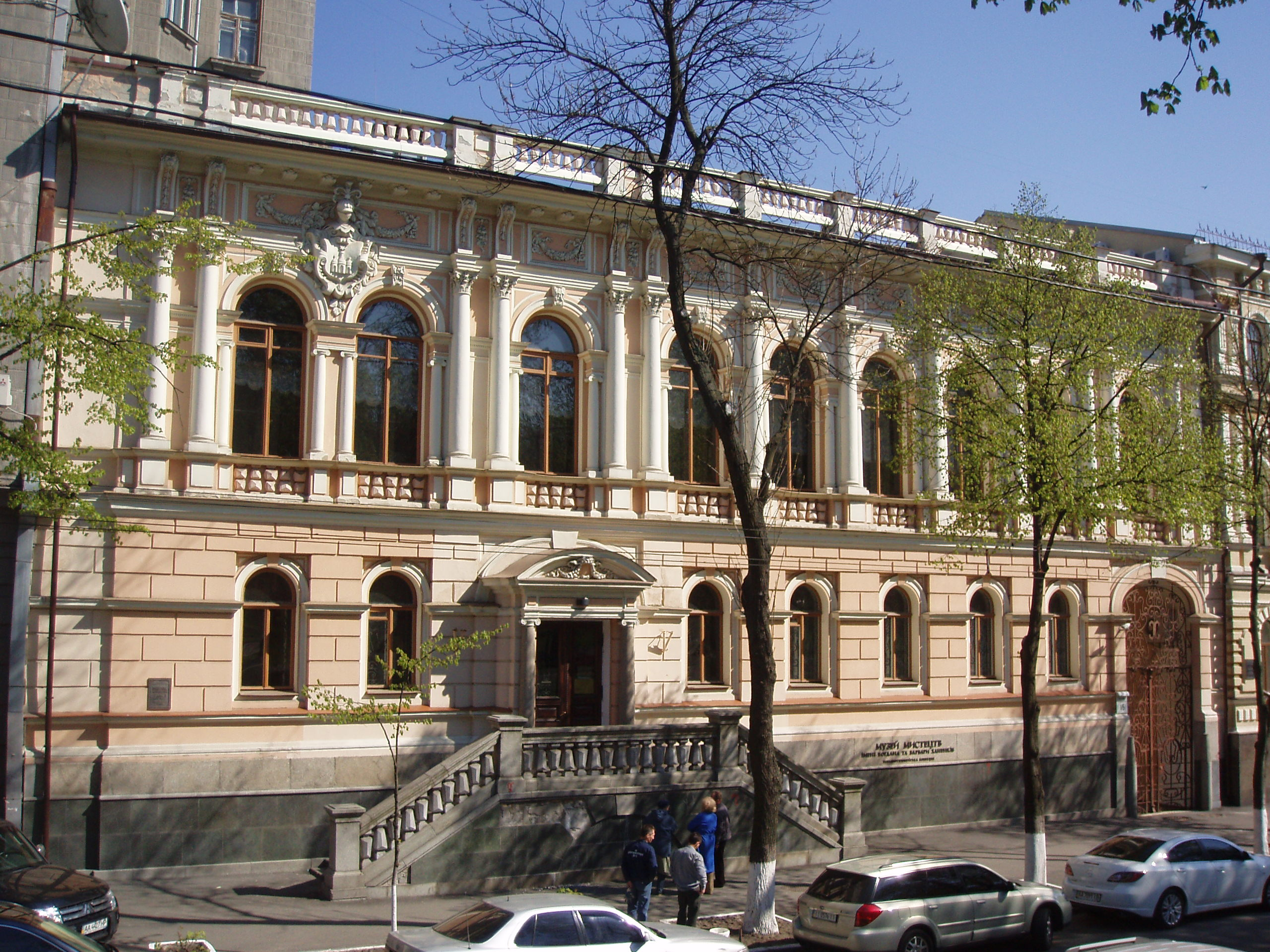
The Bohdan and Varvara Khanenko National Museum of Arts in Kyiv

== Kyiv ==
- Ivan Honchar Museum (National Center of Folk Culture) – 19 Lavrska St,
- "Lavra" Art Gallery – 1 Lavrska St
- Mykola Siadrystyi Micro Miniatures Museum – 9 Lavrska St
- Museum of Modern Art of Ukraine – 41 Kyrylivska St
- Mystetskyi Arsenal National Art and Culture Museum Complex (Mystetskyi Arsenal) – 10-12 Lavrska St
- Museum of Western and Oriental Art (Bogdan and Varvara Khanenko Museum of Art) – 15 Tereshchenkivska St
- National Art Museum of Ukraine – 6 Mykhaila Hrushevskoho St
- National Museum of Ukrainian Folk Decorative Art – 9 Lavrska St
- Pinchuk Art Centre – St. Velyka Vasylkivska, 1 Baseina St
- Shcherbenko Art Centre – 22B Mykhailivska St
- Museum of Theater, Music and Cinema of Ukraine – building 26, 9 Lavrska St, Kyiv
- Museum of Books and Publishing of Ukraine – building 9, 10, 9 Lavrska St

== Luhansk Oblast ==
- Luhansk Art Museum
- Stakhanov Historical and Art Museum

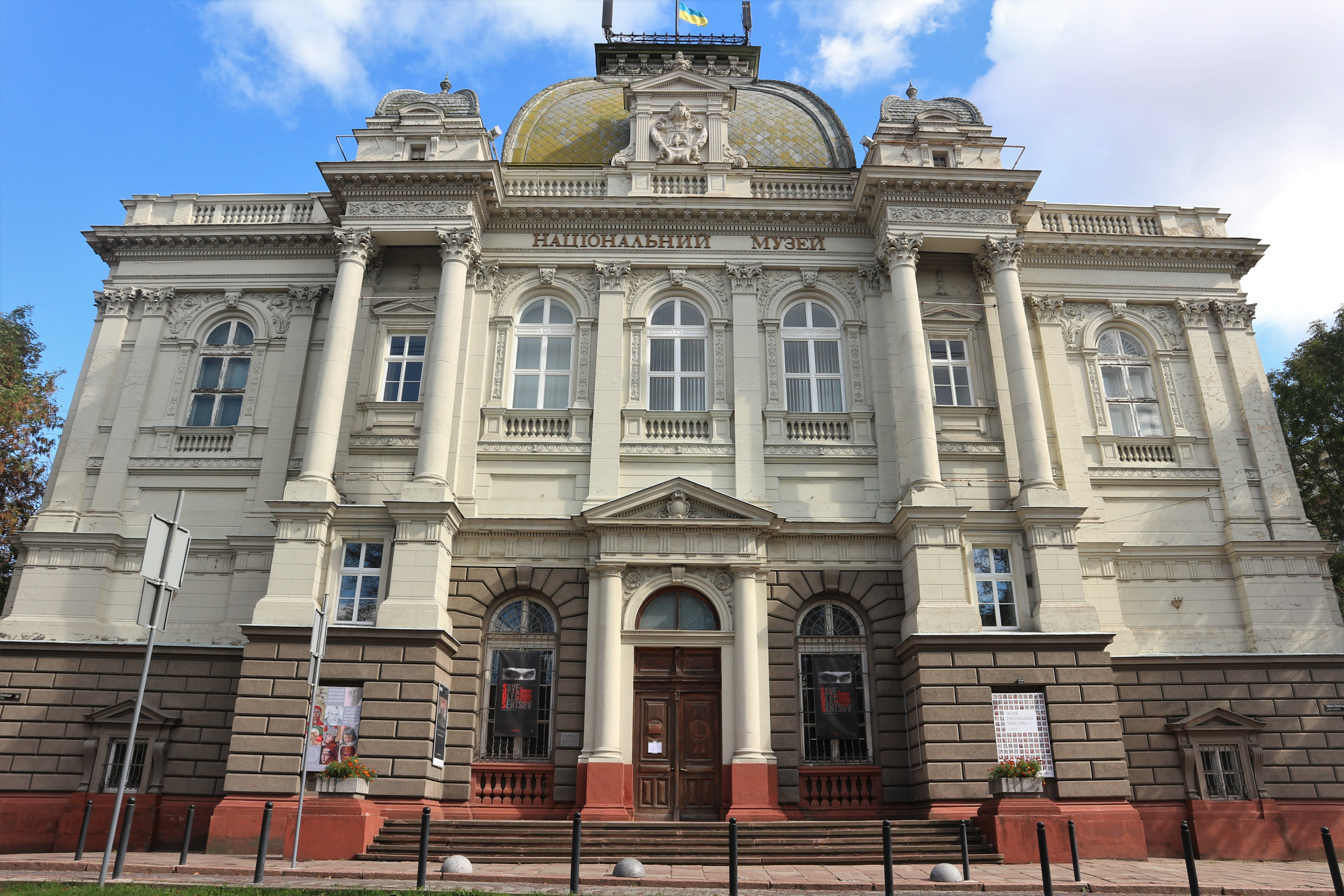
Lviv National Museum

== Lviv Oblast ==
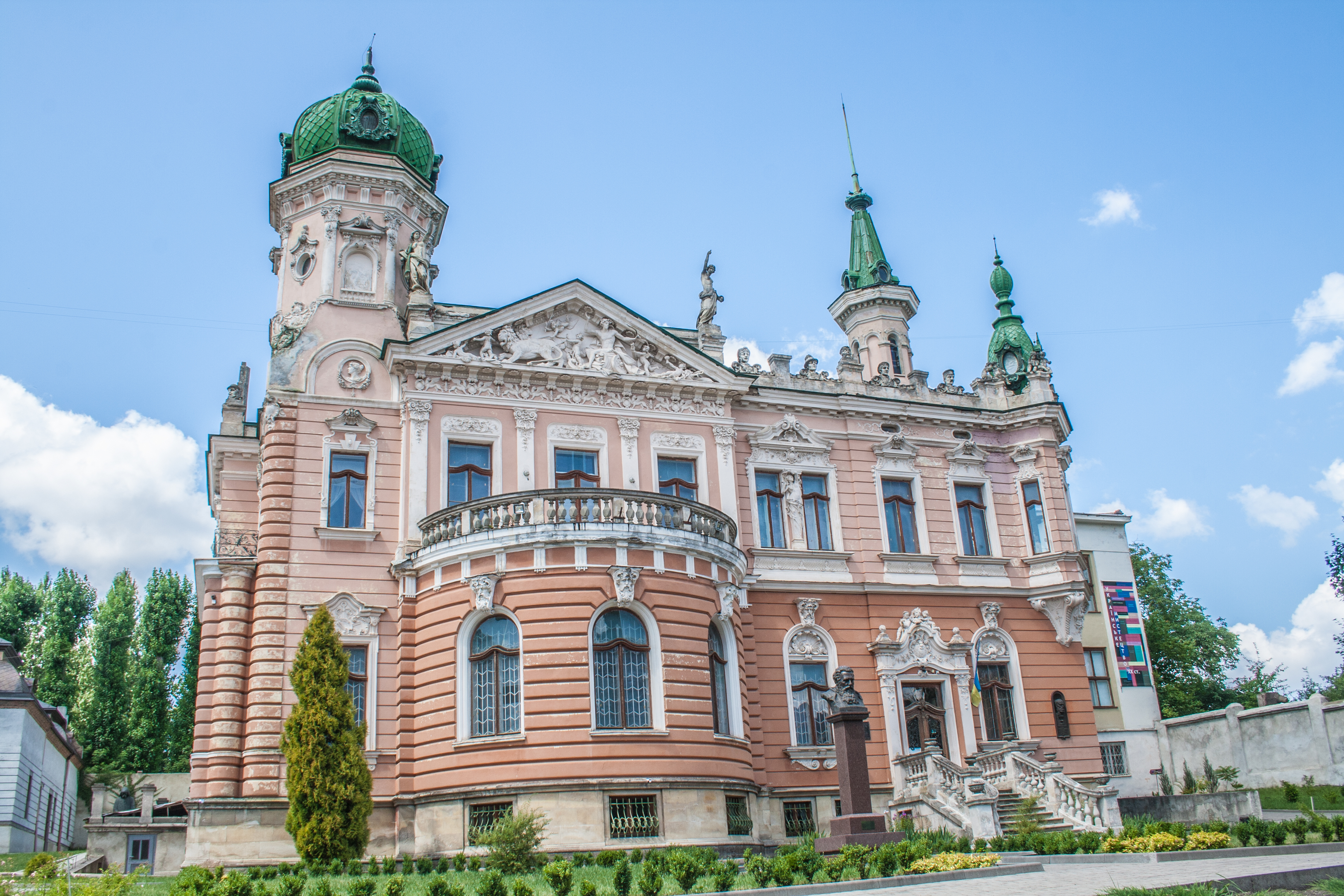
Sheptytsky Museum

- Borys Voznytsky Lviv National Art Gallery
- Lviv Municipal Art Center
- Andrey Sheptytsky National Museum of Lviv
  - Olena Kulchytska Art Memorial Museum, Lviv
  - Oleksa Novakivsky Art Memorial Museum, Lviv
  - Leopold Levitsky Art Memorial Museum, Lviv
  - Mykhaila Bilas Art Museum, Truskavets
  - Ivan Trush Art Memorial Museum, Lviv
  - Sokalshchyna Art Museum, Chervonograd
  - Boykivshchyna Art Museum, Sambir

== Mykolaiv Oblast ==
- The V. V. Vereshchagin Mykolaiv Art Museum
  - Ochakivsky Museum of Marine Painting named after R. Sudkovsky
  - E. Kibrik Ascension Art Museum

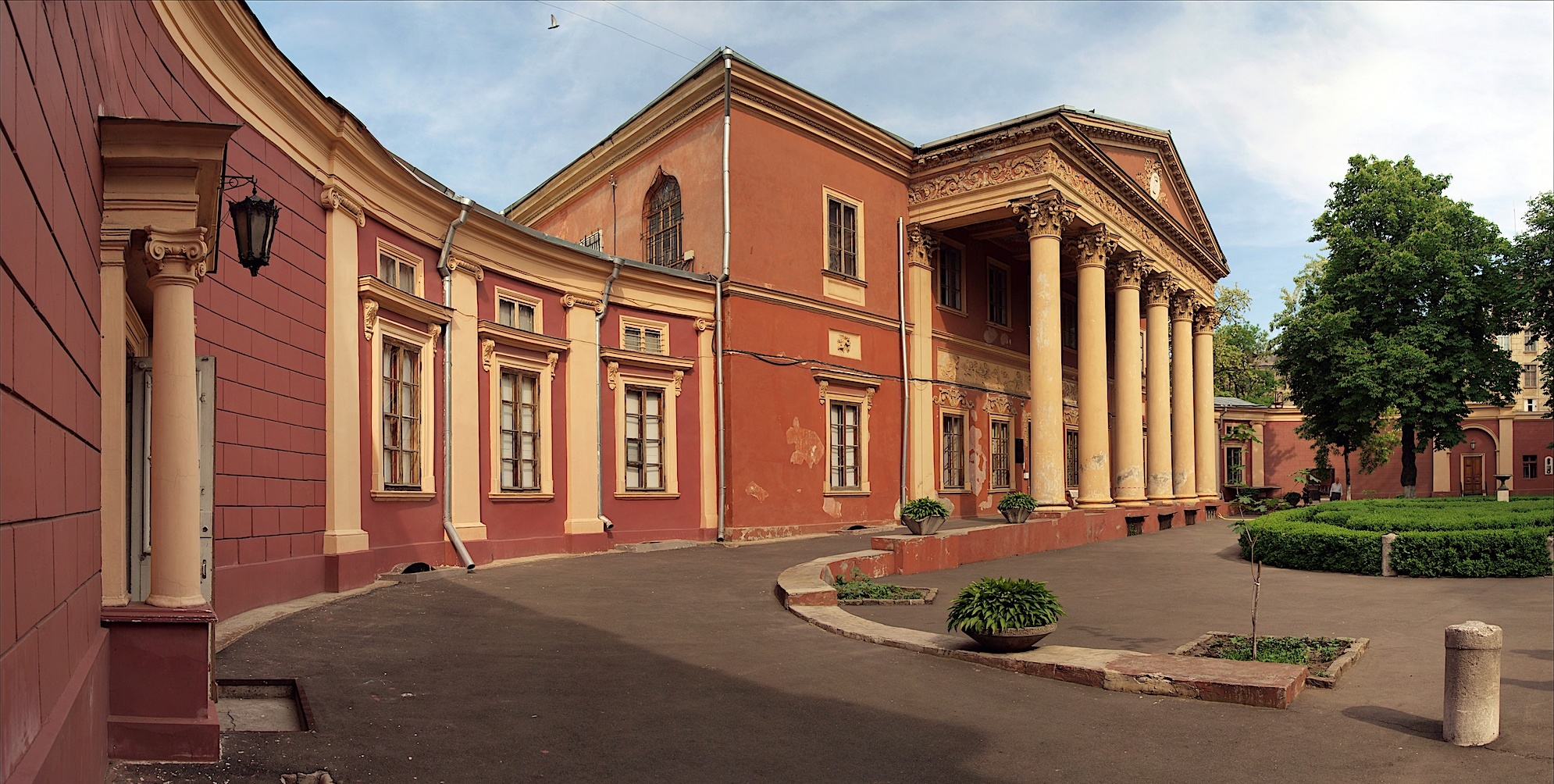
Odesa Art Museum

== Odesa Oblast ==
- Odesa Art Museum
  - Ananyiv Historical Art Museum
- Odesa Museum of Western and Eastern Art
- Izmail Art Gallery
- Museum of Fine Arts of the Black Sea named after O. M. Bilo

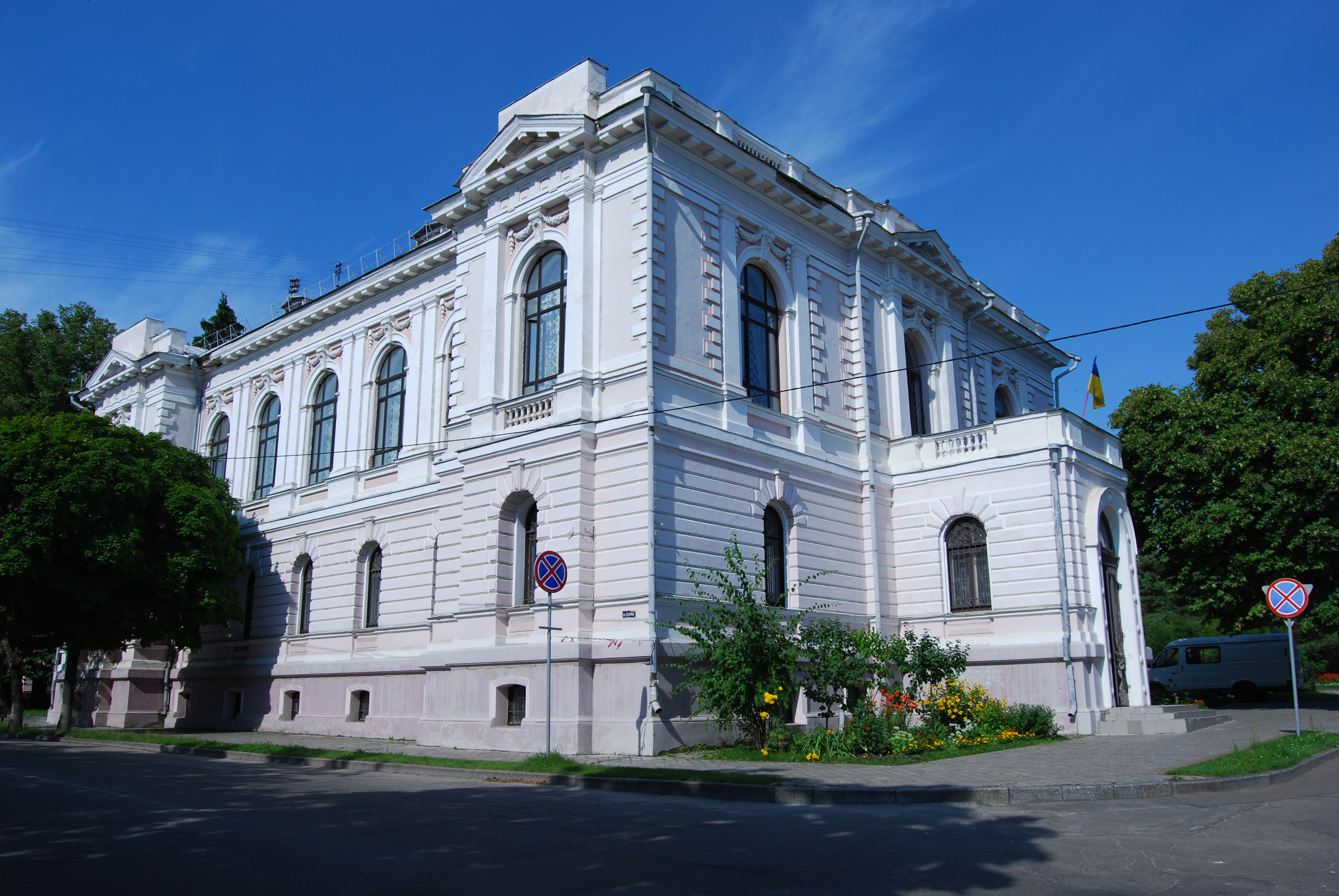
Nikanor Onatsky Regional Art Museum in Sumy

== Poltava Oblast ==
- Poltava Art Museum
- Kremenchutska Urban Art Gallery
- Natalia Yuzefovych Art Gallery, Kremenchuk

== Sumy Oblast ==
- Nikanor Onatsky Regional Art Museum in Sumy
- Lebedyn Municipal Art Museum

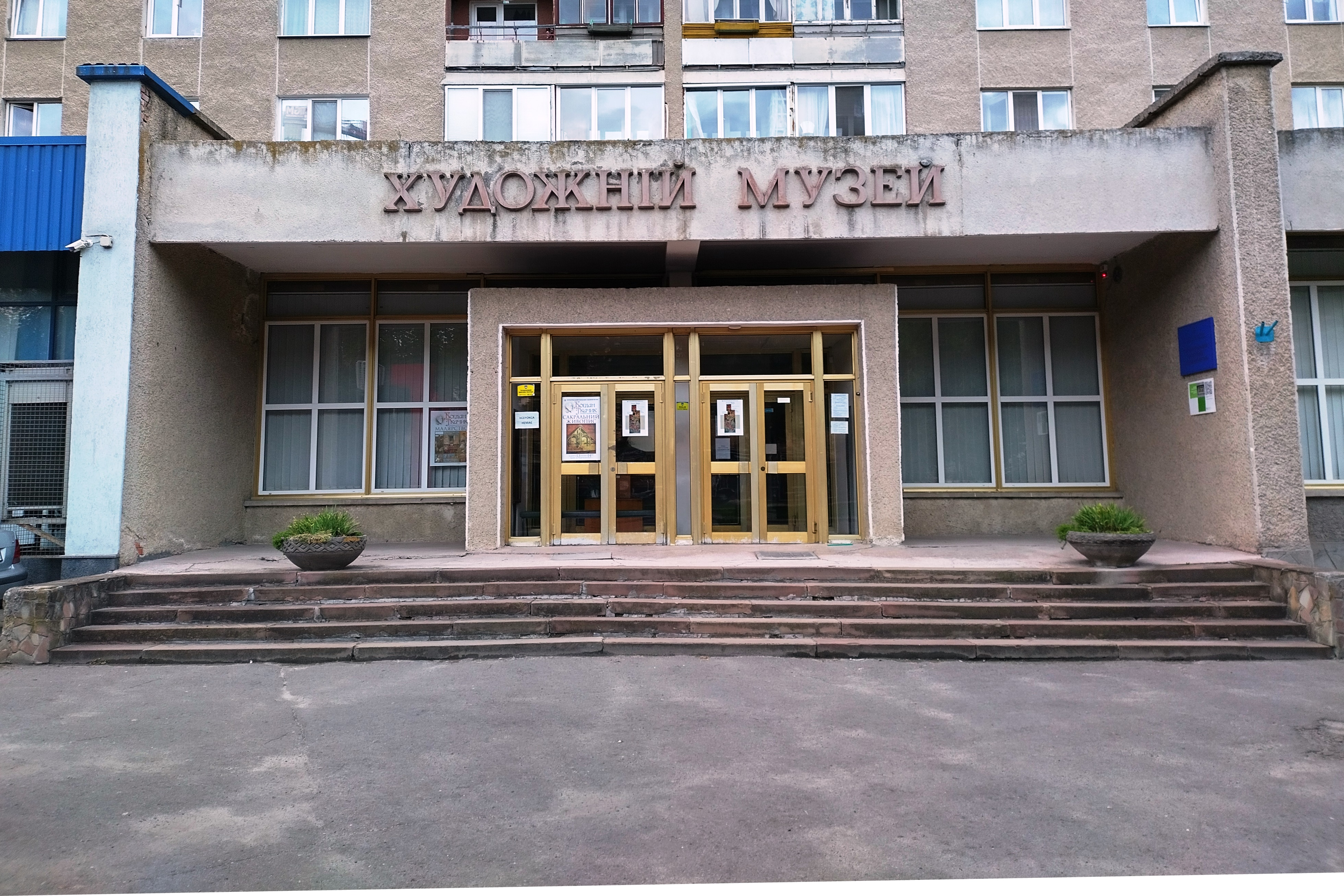
The Ternopil Regional Art Museum

== Ternopil Oblast ==
- Ternopil Regional Art Museum
- I. Khvorostetsky Memorial Art Museum (Department of the Kremenetsky Museum of Local Lore), Pochaiv

== Vinnytsia Oblast ==
- Vinnytsia Art Museum
- Shargorodsky Museum of Fine Arts
- Yampilsky Museum of Fine Arts

== Volyn Oblast ==
- Art Department of the Volyn Museum of Local Lore, Lutsk

== Zakarpattia Oblast ==
- Transcarpathian Regional Art Museum of Joseph Bokshay

== Zaporizhzhia Oblast ==
- Zaporizhsky Art Museum
- Berdyansky Art Museum named after I. I. Brodsky
- Energodarsky Art Exhibition Hall

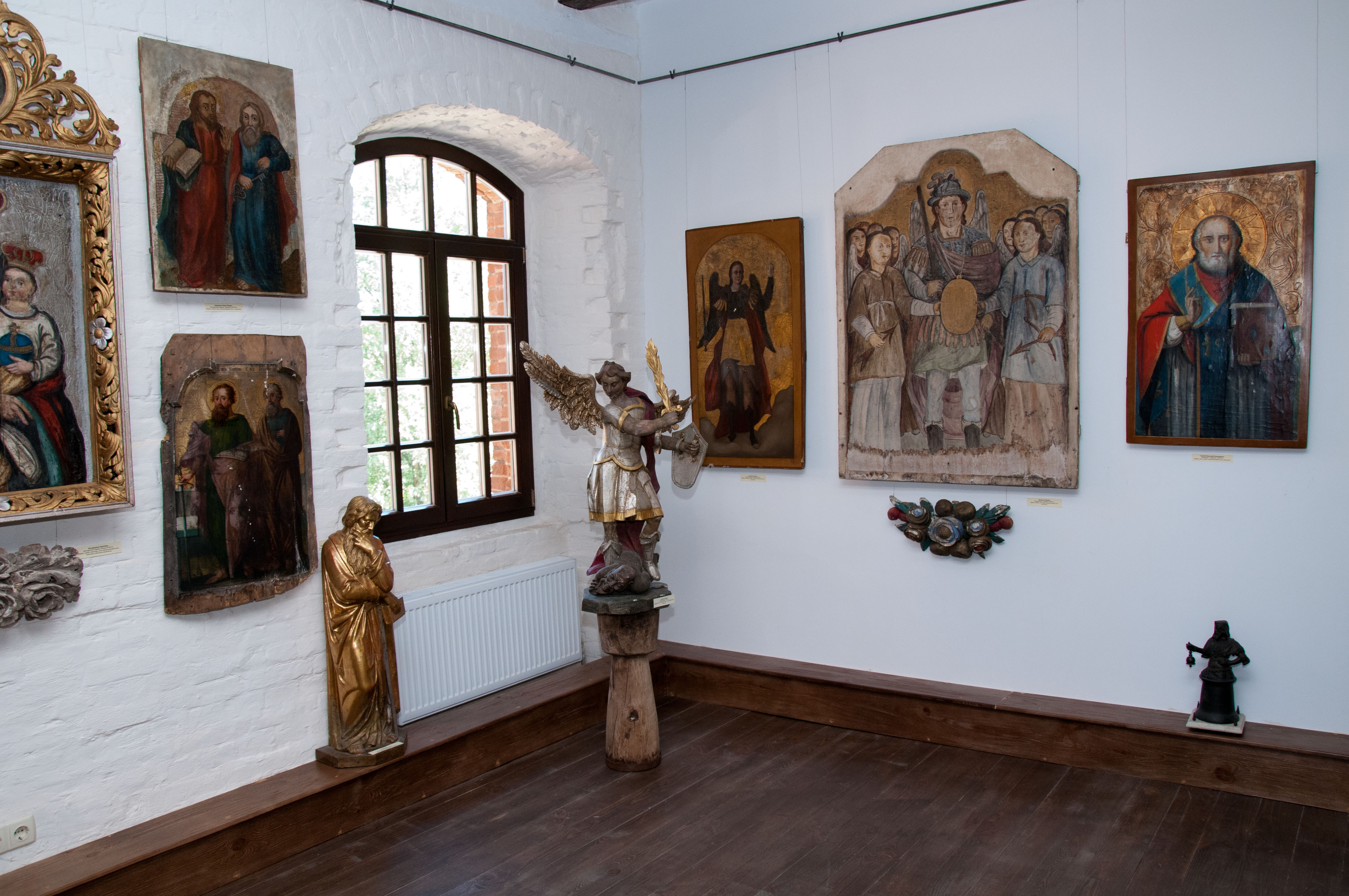
Museum of Domestic Ukrainian Icons in Radomysl Castle, Radomyshl

== Zhytomyr Oblast ==
- Zhytomyr Art Museum (department of the Zhytomyr Museum of Local Lore)
- Kmytiv Museum of Fine Arts named after JD Bukhanchuk
- Museum of Domestic Ukrainian Icons

== See also ==
- List of museums in Ukraine
