= Lviv Municipal Art Center =

- Львівський муніципальний мистецький центр
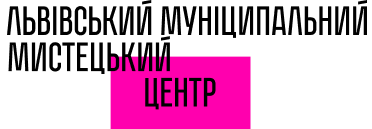

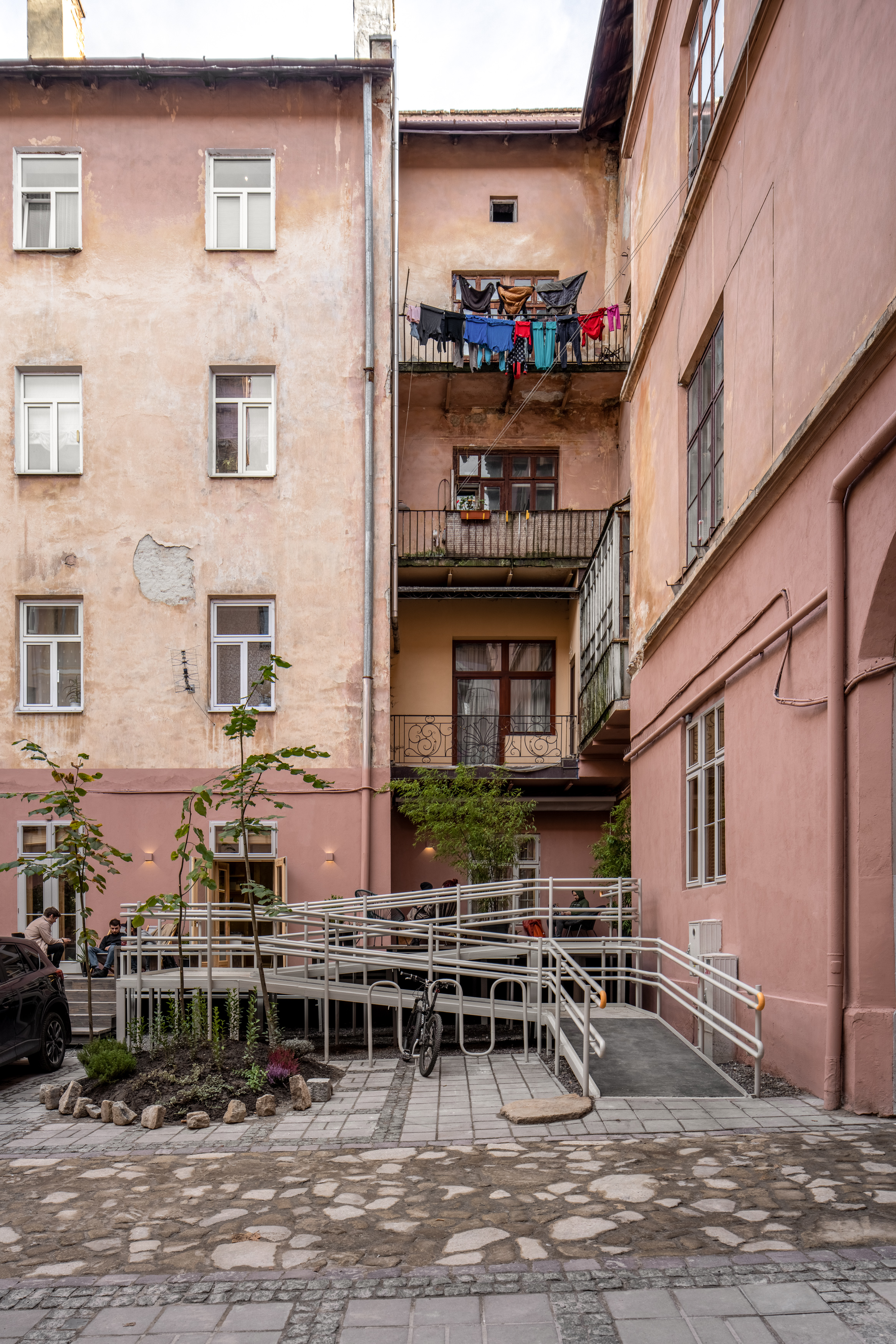
- Established: October 19, 2020
- Location: 11 Stefanyka Street, Lviv, Ukraine
- Coordinates: 49.83654°N 24.02651°E
- Type: Art center with a gallery
- Director: Lyana Mytsko
- Architect: Hrystyna Badzyan
- Website: http://www.lvivart.center

Lviv Municipal Art Center is an art center with a gallery in Lviv, opened in 2020. It is the first institution in the city that was created at the expense of the city budget and aimed at implementing projects in the field of contemporary art. Art center positions itself as a modern, open and inclusive multifunctional space.

== History ==
The history of the center began in November 2018, when a small rally was held by representatives of the creative community to protect the development of culture in Lviv. It was preceded by the resale of the non-profit gallery "Dzyga", the closure of the sculpture workshop in Stryiskyi Park and the closure of most of the venues for small concerts.

During the rally, activists dressed in black placed a tombstone with the inscription "Lviv is the cultural capital" on Virmenska Street near "Dzyga" and placed a large plywood with a manifesto written by Bohdan Shumylovych near the Town Hall:

Lviv artists invite the city to a dialogue! Lviv was left without an art center. There is no place for culture to develop in Lviv! Workshops are being taken away from artists, galleries, concert venues are being closed, ugly monuments are being erected! We want to draw the attention of the community, business and government to the problem of cultural degradation of society in which we find ourselves. The closure of creative centers, contempt for art institutions, corruption in the property fund of the Union of Artists of Ukraine by the state will lead to the marginalization and decline of art. Lviv has already turned from a cultural capital into a ragul dumpling house with indistinct modern architecture and kitsch monuments. The creative community needs the support of the city and the understanding of private business more than ever. We need a place to create a relevant culture!

— St. John of Dukla Society of Artists

Among the participants of the action were art manager Lyana Mytsko, teacher of the Lviv Academy of Arts Oleh Suslenko, artists Oleksiy Yakunin, Anatoliy Tatarenko, sculptor Oleksiy Konoshenko and others.

=== Establishment ===
City officials witnessed the protest and began a dialogue and search for premises for the future space. In the end, they chose the building at 11 Stefanyka Street, a neo-Gothic townhouse of Leon Sapieha, built in the mid-1870s by Lviv architect Adolf Kuhn. Previously, the premises housed editorial offices of newspapers, workshops and a bookstore of the Ossoliński family with a reading room, but for the last 20 years it has been idle and abandoned.

Work on the center began in November 2019. The city's investment amounted to ₴8.7 million. Its initiators, expert group, Lviv City Council Development Department, architects and contractors worked on the project. The façade of the building was restored, the roof was repaired, and the courtyard was arranged. At the same time, they left an authentic painting on the walls, a wooden door portal and bricks. Ivan Levynskys tiles have been preserved on one of the walls. The art center was opened on October 19, 2020.

== Description ==
The art center has a gallery with an exhibition area of square 100 meters, a media library, lecture halls, a bookstore, a coffee shop and an art workshop. The walls are painted white, and the simple interior does not interfere with the perception of art objects. The entire space of the center is barrier-free and inclusive: at the entrance from the yard there is a ramp with a safe angle, potentially traumatic corners are marked with contrasting colors, the reception has a map for blind people, bathroom and changing room are also inclusive.

The author of the architectural project is Hrystyna Badzyan, co-founder of the architectural bureau Replus. The director of the center was Lyana Mytsko, deputy director Natalia Geraimovych, curators of exhibitions – Pavlo Kovach, artist and member of the "Open Group", and Oleg Suslenko, lecturer at the Department of Graphic Design of the Lviv Academy of Arts. The head of the Department of Graphic Design of the Academy of Arts Petro Nagirny developed a font for the art center, taken from the inscriptions found on pre-WW2 Lviv houses.
