= Józef Ossoliński =

Józef Ossoliński may refer to several members of the Ossoliński family:

- Józef Kanty Ossoliński (1707-1780)
- Józef Maksymilian Ossoliński (1748-1829)
- Józef Kajetan Ossoliński (1758-1834)
