= Kharkiv Municipal Gallery =

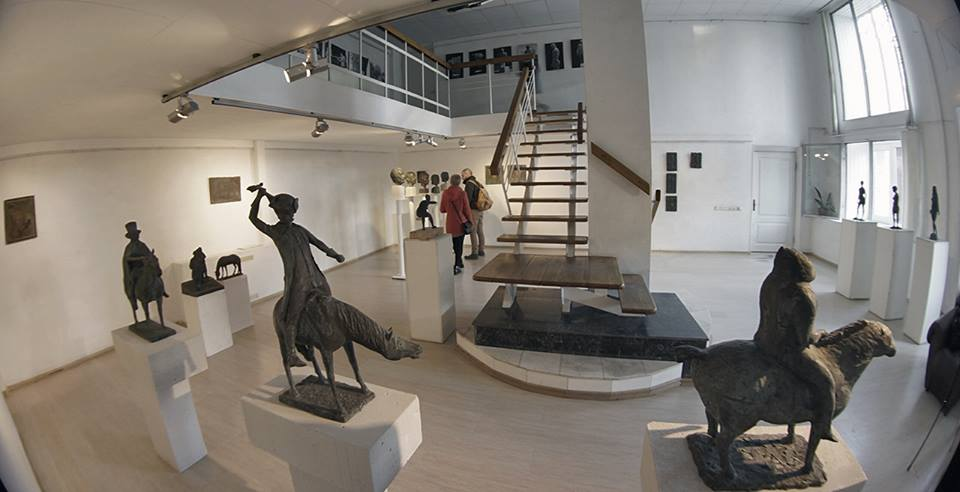
- Established: 1996
- Location: Kharkiv, Chernyshevskaya st., 15
- Coordinates: 49°59′54″N 36°14′11″E
- Director: Тетяна Тумасян
- Curator: Тетяна Тумасян
- Website: http://www.mgallery.kharkov.ua

The Kharkiv Municipal Gallery (Ukrainian: Харківська муніципальна галерея, romanized: Kharkivska munitsypalna halereia) is one of the first Ukrainian galleries (opened in 1996) of contemporary art. The gallery combines the programs and exhibitions of traditional paintings, graphics, sculpture, photo, and contemporary art projects and new media.

Since 2008 there is ARTbasement platform that works exclusively with youth and experimental art.

== History ==
Kharkiv Municipal Gallery has been in existence since 1996. This is one of the first municipal galleries in Ukraine. Since 1997 – member of the Association of Art Galleries of Ukraine. Over the years, Kharkiv Municipal Gallery became an authoritative and renowned center for contemporary art, not only in Ukraine but also abroad. The gallery has a main exhibition hall (100 sq. M.), as well as an underground playground for the ART subsoil (140 sq. M).

== Featured artists ==
Vagrich Bakhchanyan (1938–2009), BOB-group, Oleksiy Borisov, Sergej Bratkov, Alexander Vlasenko, Artem Volokitin, Stanislav Gedzevich, Victor Gontarov (1943–2009), Hamlet Zinkovsky, Irina Ilyinskaya, Igor Ilyinsky, Alina Kleitman, Konstantin Zorkin, Boris Kosarev (1897–1994), Volodymyr Kochmar, Vitaliy Kokhan, Olena Kudinova (1958–2017), Vitaliy Kulikov (1935–2015), Pavel Makov, Roman Minin, Natalya Mironenko, Boris Mikhailov, Vachagan Norazyan, Elena Polaschenko, Alexander Ridny, Viktor Sidorenko, Sergei Solonsky, Alexander Suprun, "Shilo" art group, Eduard Yashin.
