= Lebedyn Municipal Art Museum =

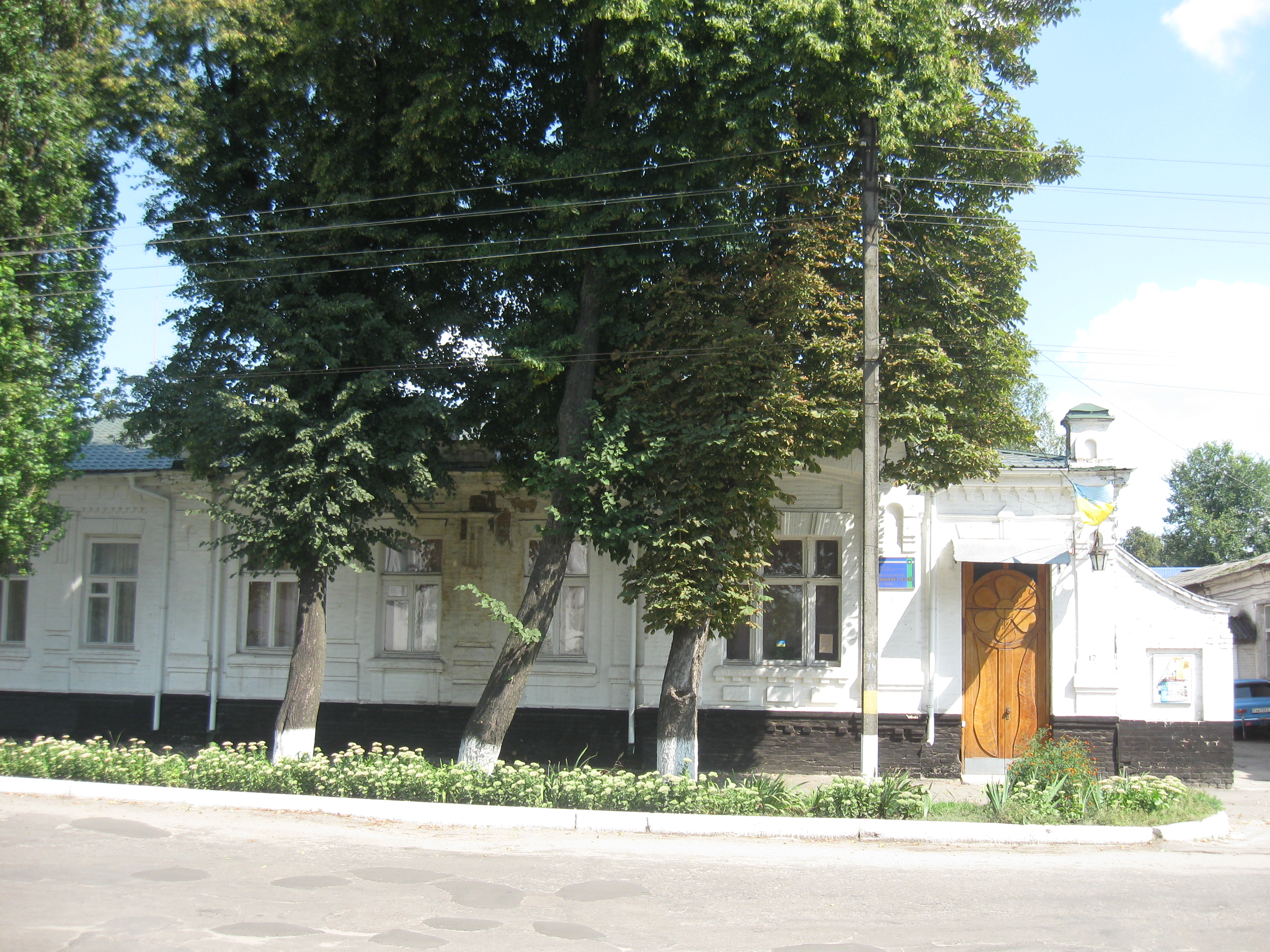
The Lebedyn Municipal Art Museum in 2016

The Lebedyn Municipal Art Museum (Ukrainian: Лебединський міський художній музей імені Бориса Руднєва) has a large collection of Old Masters and contemporary artworks. It is located in Lebedyn, Sumy Oblast, western Ukraine.

The museum's address is Lebedyn, Voli Sq. 1.

The museum was founded on 20 November 1918 by Borys Rudnev (1879–1944), a process engineer from Kharkiv.
