= Chernihiv =

City in Chernihiv Oblast, Ukraine

Chernihiv Чернігів
- City
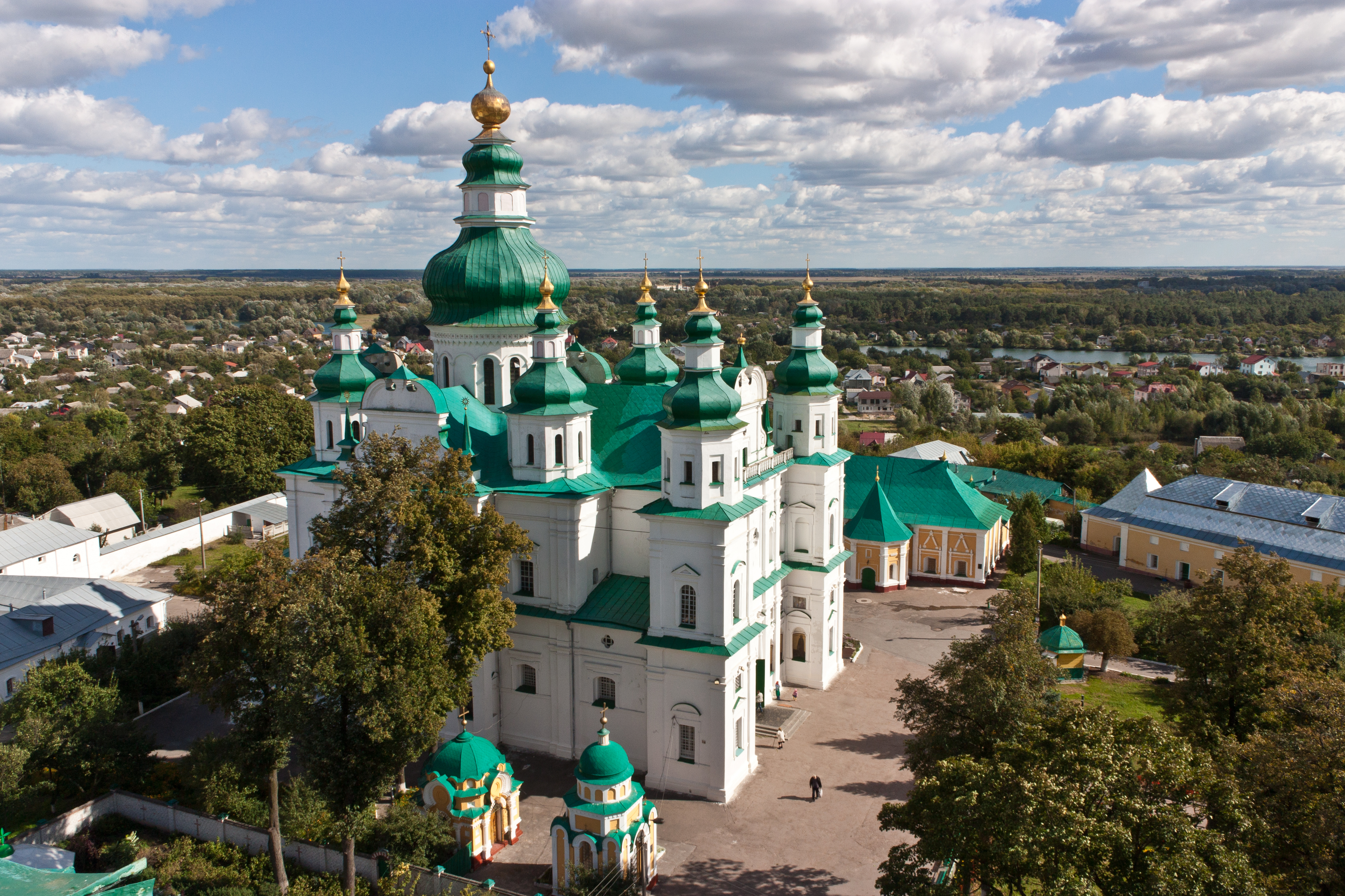
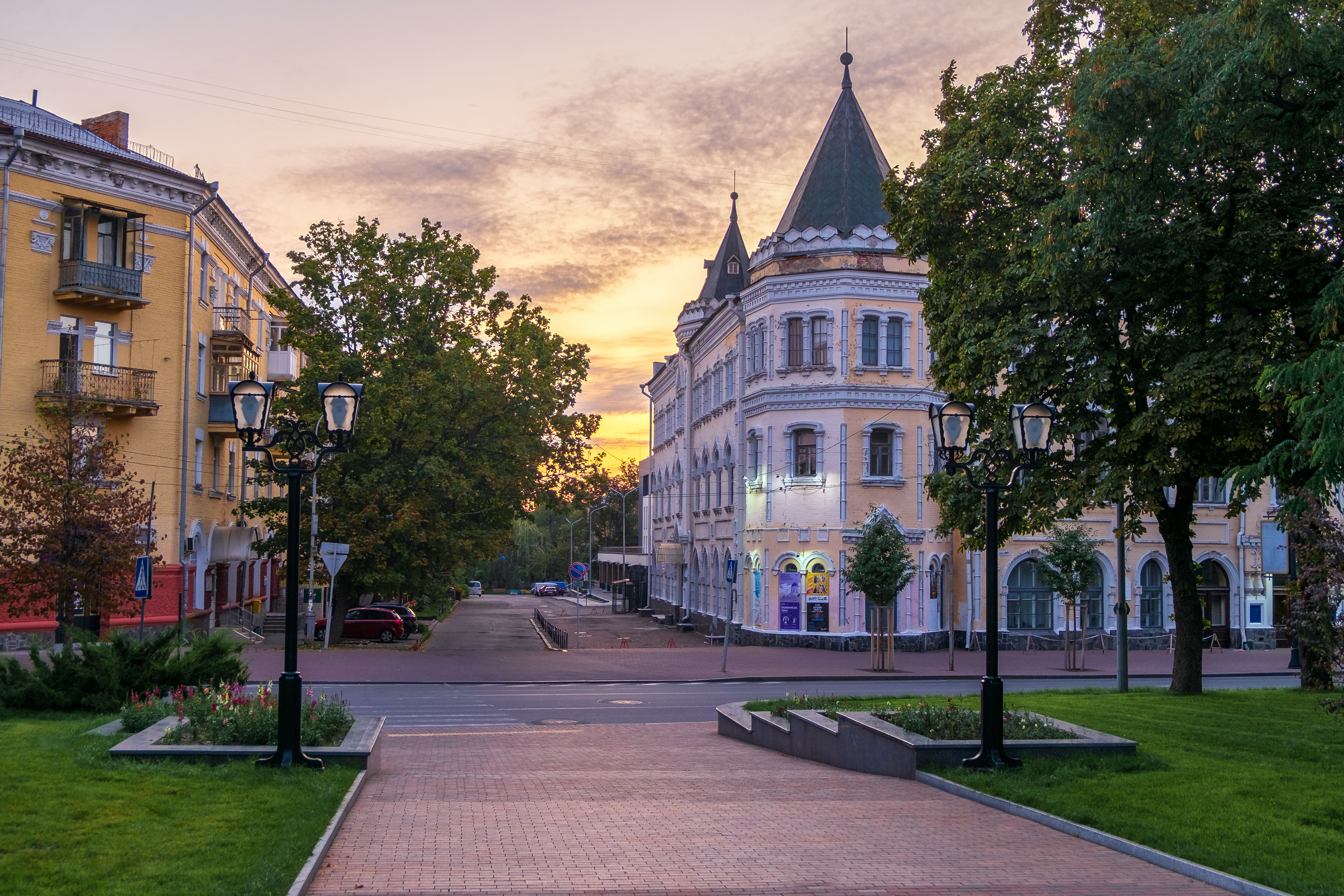
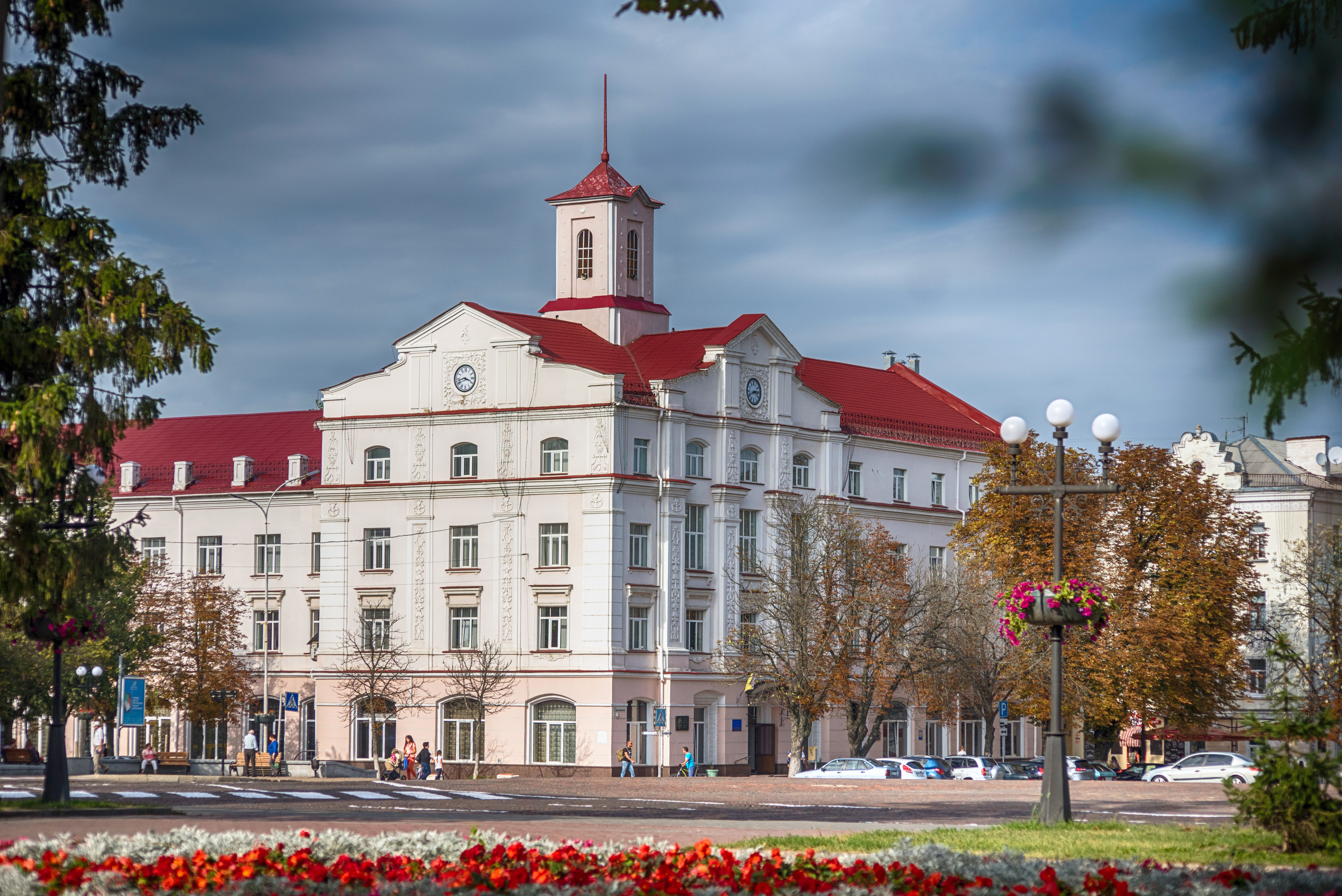
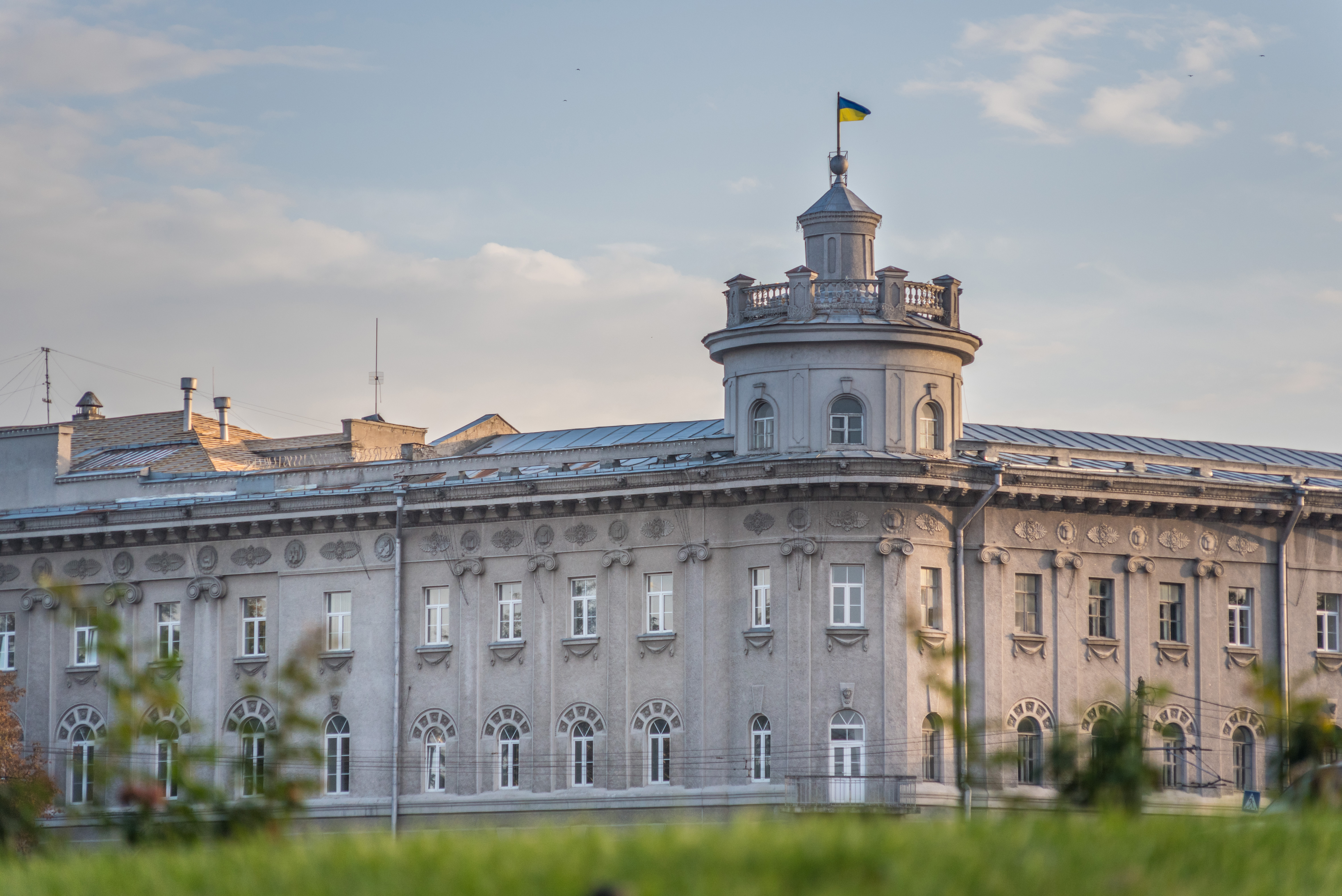
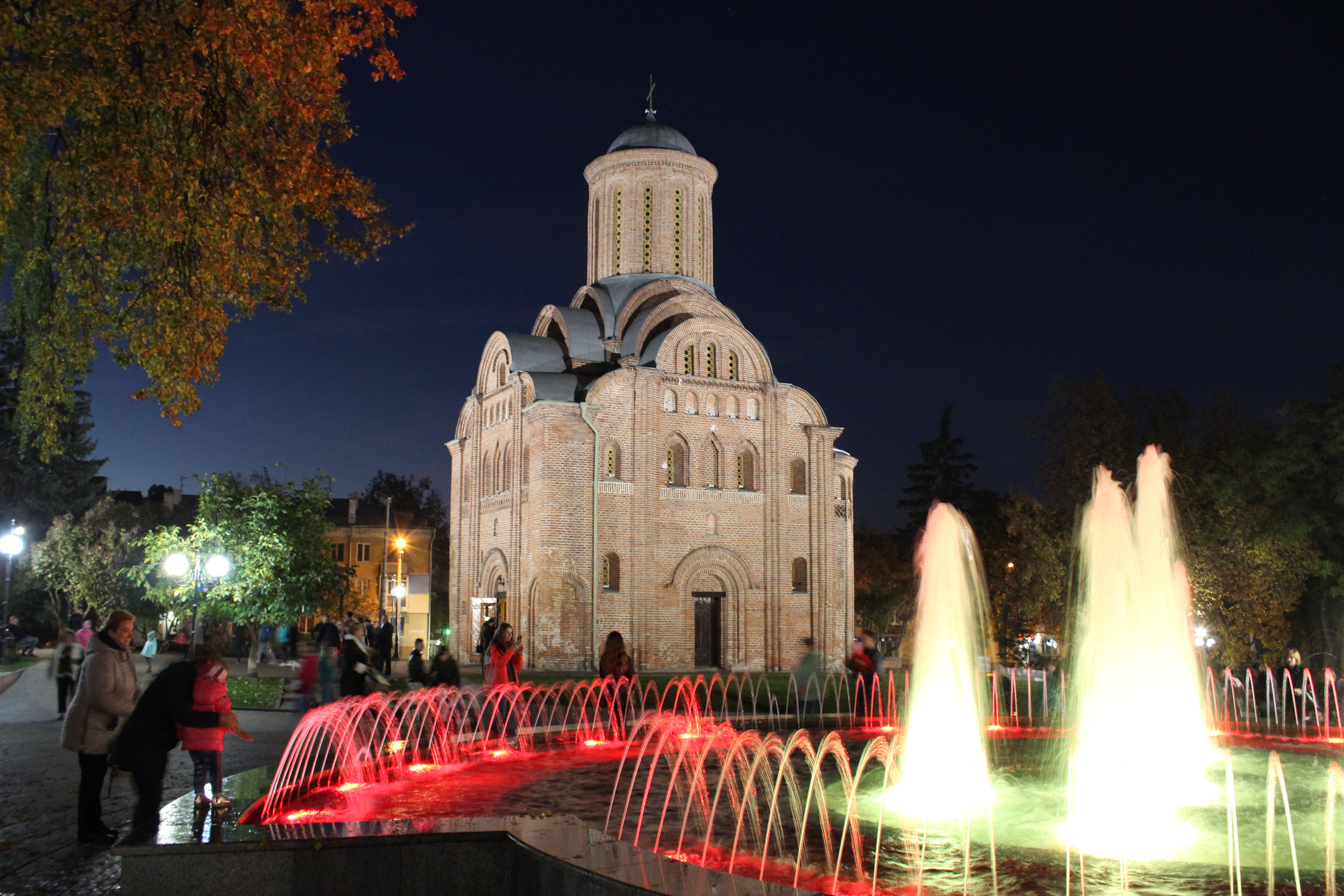
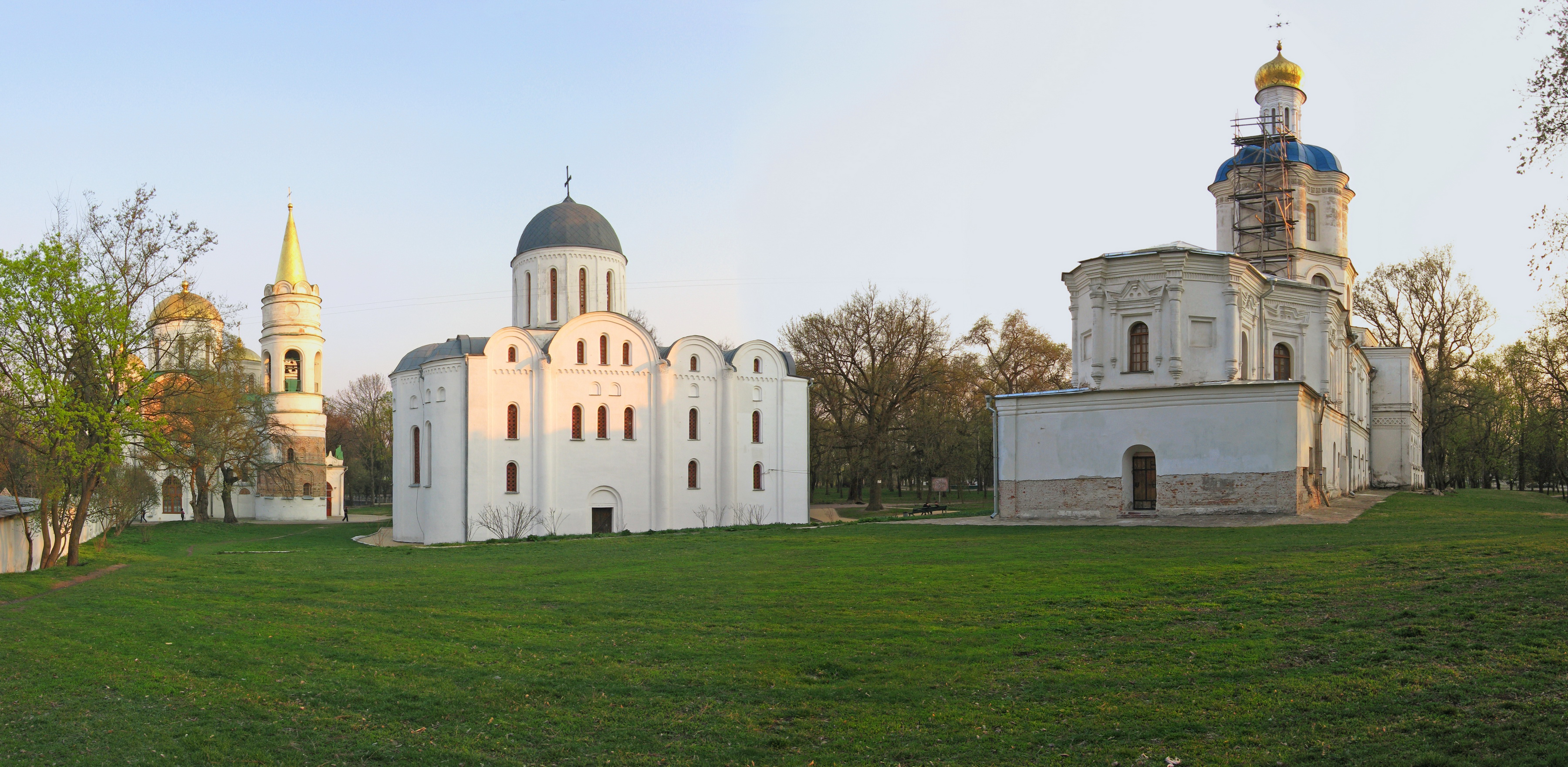
- Trinity Monastery Chernihiv Philharmony Administrative building Former governorate zemstvo Piatnytska Church View of ancient Chernihiv with Transfiguration, Boris and Gleb Cathedrals and Chernihiv Collegium

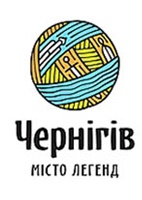
- Flag Coat of arms Logo
- Nickname: City of Legends
- Location of Chernihiv in Ukraine Chernihiv (Ukraine)
- Coordinates: 51°29′38″N 31°17′41″E
- Country: Ukraine
- Oblast: Chernihiv Oblast
- Raion: Chernihiv Raion
- Hromada: Chernihiv urban hromada
- First mentioned: 907

Government
  - Mayor: Oleksandr Lomako (Native Home)

Area
  - Total: 79 km^{2} (31 sq mi)
- Elevation: 136 m (446 ft)

Population (2022)
  - Total: 282,747
  - Density: 1,547/km^{2} (4,010/sq mi)
- Postal code: 14000
- Area code: (+380) 462
- Vehicle registration: CB / 25
- Website: chernigiv-rada.gov.ua

Chernihiv (Ukrainian: Чернігів, IPA: [tʃerˈn⁽ʲ⁾iɦiu̯]; Russian: Чернигов, romanized: Chernigov, IPA: [tɕɪrˈnʲiɡəf]) is a city and municipality in northern Ukraine, which serves as the administrative center of Chernihiv Oblast and Chernihiv Raion within the oblast. Chernihiv's population is 282,747 (2022 estimate).

Originally a tribal centre of Siverians, in the 9th century Chernihiv was incorporated into the Rus' state, becoming its second most important city after Kyiv. Between the 11th and 13th century it served as the centre of an eponymous principality and a bishopric. Chernihiv's role as an important cultural and religious centre of Rus' is signified by numerous churches preserved from that era. Following the Tatar invasion the city lost its leading role in Siveria and was eventually incorporated by the Grand Duchy of Lithuania, but suffered from Tatar and Muscovite attacks. During most of the 16th century Chernihiv was part of the Tsardom of Moscow, but in 1618 was transferred to Poland and served as a centre of a voivodeship. In 1623 the city was awarded with Magdeburg Law.

Chernihiv experienced a new rise in its importance following its incorporation into the Cossack Hetmanate. During the late 17th and early 18th century the city served as a major cultural centre of Ukraine, and many of its structures were rebuilt in Ukrainian Baroque style. In 1700 a collegium was established in the city. Following the Hetanate's disbandment, in 1782 Chernihiv became part of an eponymous viceroyalty, which was later transformed into Chernigov Governorate. In the Russian Empire it functioned as a centre of administration, trade and crafts. During that period Chernihiv became a hotspot of culture, science and publishing. During the 19th century the city housed a Ukrainian autonomist circle and saw the emergence of a radical Hromada movement. Among its notable inhabitants was the Ukrainian writer Mykhailo Kotsiubynsky.

After the February Revolution a Free Cossack militia was formed in Chernihiv, and it came under control of the Ukrainian Central Rada. After the end of the Russian Civil War the city became the centre of an eponymous region as part of Soviet Ukraine, one of republics of the Soviet Union. Under Soviet rule Chernihiv underwent rapid industrialization. Severely damaged during World War II, in its aftermath the city was rebuilt according to a new plan. During the Russian invasion of Ukraine in 2022 Chernihiv was designated as a Hero City of Ukraine by the Ukrainian government.

== Names and etymology ==
The name Chernihiv/Chernigov is a compound name, which begins with the Slavic root Cherni-/Cherno-, which means 'black'. Scholars vary with interpretations of the second part of the name (-hiv/-gov, -говъ) though scholars such as Dr. Martin Dimnik, Professor of Medieval History at University of Toronto, connect Chernihov with the worship of "the black god" Chernibog.

The city of Chernihiv is also historically known by different names in other languages – Polish: Czernihów; Yiddish: טשערניגאָב (Tshernigov).

== History ==
=== Early history ===
Chernihiv was first mentioned (as Черниговъ) in the Rus'–Byzantine Treaty (907), but the time of its establishment is unknown. Artifacts from the Khazar Khaganate uncovered by archaeological excavations at a settlement there indicate that it seems to have existed at least as early as the 9th century. Towards the end of the 10th century, the city probably had its own rulers. It was there that the Black Grave, one of the largest and earliest royal mounds in Eastern Europe, was excavated in the 19th century.

During the late 11th - early 12th century Chernihiv hegumen Daniel travelled to the Holy Land, leaving an eyewitness account of his trip. Parts of a lost chronicle created in the city have been preserved in later documents.

The city was second in wealth and importance in the southern portion of the Kievan Rus'. From the early 11th century on, it was the seat of the powerful Principality of Chernigov, whose rulers at times vied for power with Kievan Grand Princes, and often overthrew them and took the primary seat in Kiev for themselves.

The principality was the largest in Kievan Rus and included not only the Severian towns but even such remote regions as Murom, Ryazan and Tmutarakan. The golden age of Chernigov, when the city population peaked at 25,000, lasted until 1239 when the city was sacked by the hordes of Batu Khan, and entered a long period of relative obscurity.

The area fell under the Grand Duchy of Lithuania in 1353. The city was burned again by Crimean khan Meñli I Giray in 1482 and 1497 and in the 15th to 17th centuries changed hands several times between Lithuania, Muscovy (1408–1420 and from 1503), and the Polish-Lithuanian Commonwealth (1618–1648), where it was granted Magdeburg rights in 1623 and in 1635 became a seat of Chernihiv Voivodeship in the Lesser Poland Province.

The area's importance increased again in the middle of the 17th century during and after the Khmelnytsky Uprising. In the Hetman State, Chernihiv was the city of deployment for the Chernihiv regiment (both a military and territorial unit of the state at the time).

=== Imperial Russia ===
Under the 1667 Treaty of Andrusovo, the legal suzerainty of the area was ceded to the Tsardom of Russia, with Chernihiv remaining an important center of the autonomous Cossack Hetmanate. With the abolishment of the Hetmanate, the city became an ordinary administrative center of the Russian Empire and a capital of local administrative units. The area in general was ruled by the Governor-General appointed from Saint Petersburg, the imperial capital, and Chernihiv was the capital of local namestnichestvo (province) (from 1782), Malorosiyskaya or Little Russian (from 1797) and Chernigov Governorate (from 1808).

According to the census of 1897, the city of Chernihiv had 11,000 Jews out of a total population of 27,006. Their primary occupations were industrial and commercial. Many tobacco plantations and fruit gardens in the neighborhood were owned by Jews. There were 1,321 Jewish artisans in Chernihiv, including 404 tailors and seamstresses, but the demand for artisan labor was limited to the town. There were 69 Jewish day-laborers, almost exclusively teamsters. Few, however, were employed in factories.

=== Ukrainian People's Republic ===
Chernihiv land
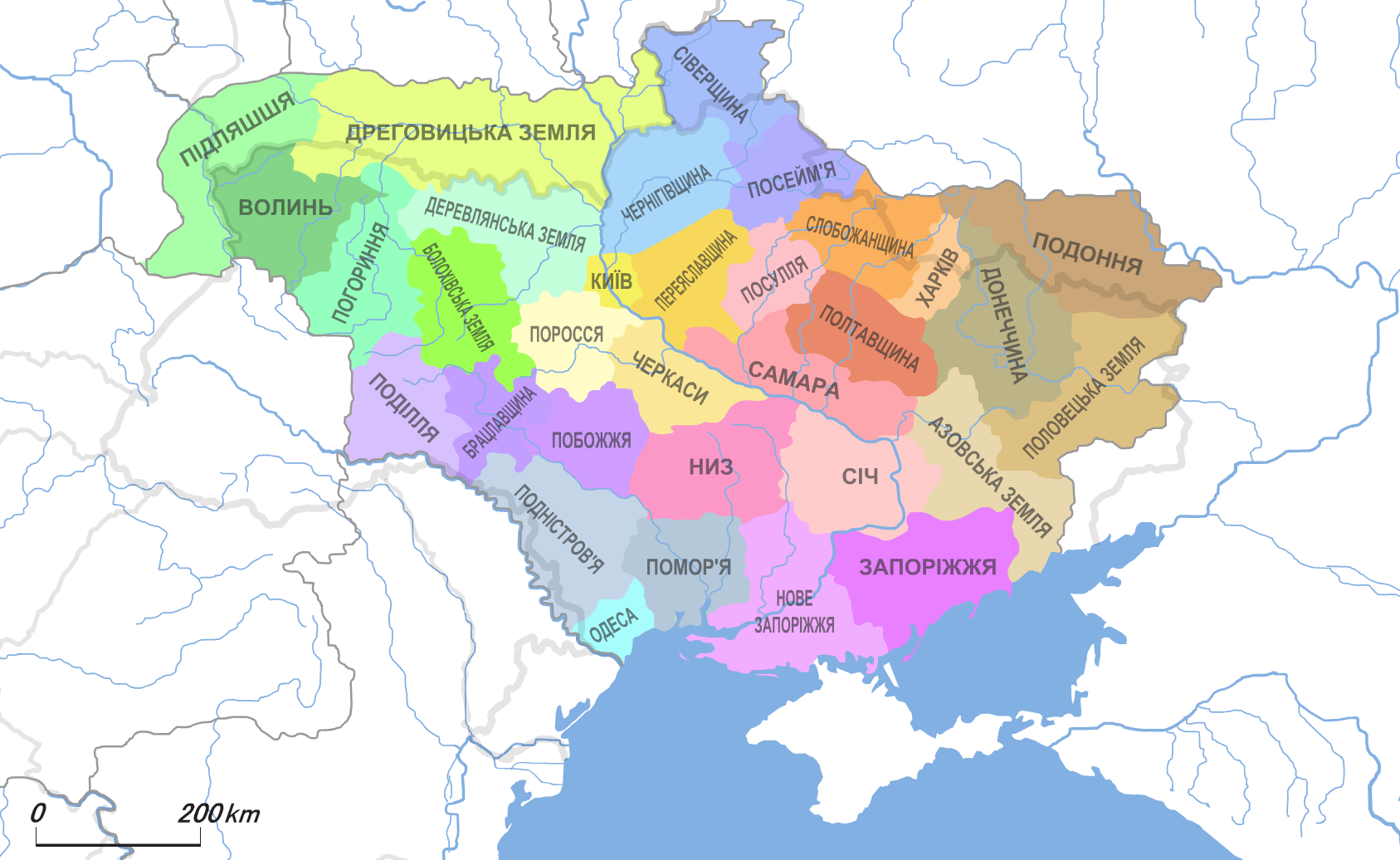
- Chernihiv land on the map
- Capital: Chernihiv
- Founded: 6 March 1918
- Disbanded: 29 April 1918

Chernihiv land was a zemlia of the Ukrainian People's Republic centered in Chernihiv. Founded on 6 March 1918 according to the Law "On the administrative-territorial division of Ukraine" approved by the Central Council of Ukraine, it was abolished on 29 April 1918 by Hetman of Ukraine Pavlo Skoropadsky, who brought back old governorate divisions of the Russian Empire.

The administrative unit included Chernihiv, Horodnia, Oster, Sosnytsia, parts of Kozelets, Nizhyn and Borzna povits of Chernigov Governorate.

=== World War II ===
During World War II, Chernihiv was occupied by the German Army from 9 September 1941 to 21 September 1943. The Germans operated a Nazi prison and a forced labour battalion for Jews in the city.

=== Independent Ukraine ===
The Statue of Lenin on Myru Avenue was toppled on February 21, 2014, as part of the demolitions of the statues of Lenin in Ukraine.

Until 18 July 2020, Chernihiv was designated as a city of oblast significance and did not belong to Chernihiv Raion even though it was the center of the raion. As part of the administrative reform of Ukraine, which reduced the number of raions of Chernihiv Oblast to five, the city was merged into Chernihiv Raion.

In June 2022, Chernihiv signed an agreement with Rzeszów, Poland to become sister cities.

==== Siege of Chernihiv ====
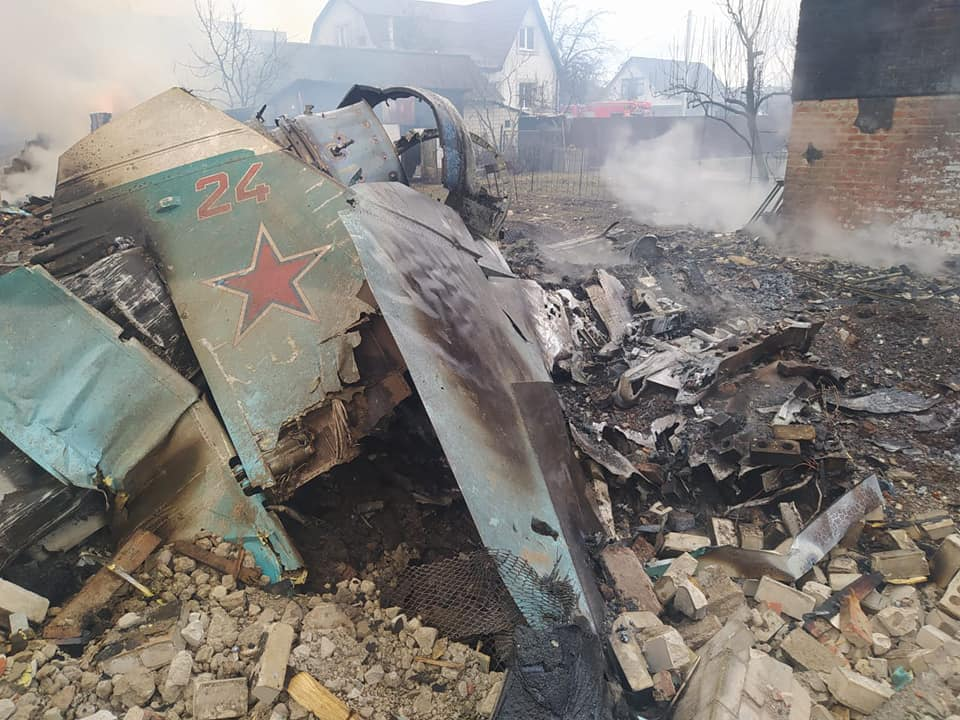
А Russian Su-34 with bombs shot down over Chernihiv

On 24 February 2022, during the 2022 Russian invasion of Ukraine, the city was under siege by the Russian Armed Forces according to the Russian Ministry of Defense, in its first battle since the Second World War. On 10 March 2022, Mayor Vladyslav Atroshenko announced that the city had been completely encircled by Russian forces.

On 5 April 2022, Governor of Chernihiv Oblast Vyacheslav Chaus stated that the Russian military had left Chernihiv Oblast, but that it had planted mines in many areas.

On 19 August 2023, a Russian missile strike killed seven in the city. On 17 April 2024, another Russian missile strike killed around 18 people in the city.

== Demographics ==
Historical population
Year	Pop.	±%
1897	27,716	—
1926	34,359	+24.0%
1939	68,597	+99.6%
1959	89,585	+30.6%
1970	158,873	+77.3%
1979	238,141	+49.9%
1989	296,347	+24.4%
2001	304,994	+2.9%
2011	296,896	−2.7%
2022	282,747	−4.8%

=== Ethnic groups ===
Distribution of the population by ethnicity according to the 2001 census:

Ethnic groups in Chernihiv
	percent
Ukrainians	86.27%
Russians	10.63%
Belarusians	1.15%
Jews	0.35%
Armenians	0.12%
Poles	0.09%
others	1.39%

=== Language ===
Distribution of the population by native language according to the 2001 census:

Language	Number	Percentage
Ukrainian	221 322	74.01%
Russian	73 277	24.50%
Other or undecided	4 439	1.49%
Total	299 038	100.00%

Despite considering Ukrainian a native language, many still didn't use it in daily life, as Russian remained the primary language for communication in Chernihiv. A 2017 survey that asked what language do participants use at home revealed that only Ukrainian was spoken only by 18% of the city's population, both Ukrainian and Russian were at 28%, while Russian was the most at 53%.

The 2022 Russian invasion caused a new wave of Ukrainization in Chernihiv, with more and more people switching to Ukrainian in their private lives. According to a survey conducted by the International Republican Institute between April and May 2023, 53% of the city's population spoke Ukrainian at home, and 41% spoke Russian.

== Geography ==
Chernihiv stands on the upper right bank of Desna River 150 km (93 mi) to the north-northeast of Kyiv. The city's territory forms a part of the Dnieper Lowland.

The area was served by Chernihiv Shestovytsia Airport prior to 2002, and during the Cold War it was the site of Chernihiv air base.

=== Rivers ===
==== Desna River ====
The city of Chernihiv is crossed by Desna River, a major left tributary of the Dnieper River. "Desna" means "right hand" in the Old East Slavic language. It is 1,130 km (700 mi) long, and has a drainage basin that covers 88,900 km^{2} (34,300 sq mi).

In Ukraine, the river's width ranges from 60 to 250 m (200 to 820 ft), with its average depth being 3 m (9.8 ft). The mean annual discharge at its mouth is 360 m^{3}/s (13,000 cu ft/s). The river freezes over from early December to early April and is navigable from Novhorod-Siverskyi to its mouth, for about 535 km (332 mi).

==== Stryzhen River ====
Right trubutary of the Desna river. 32.5 km (20.2 mi) long with a 168 km^{2} (65 sq mi) basin. This river flows into the Desna river just behind the historical center of Chernihiv.

==== Snov River ====
The Snov River, right tributary of the Desna River (Dnieper basin) has its mouth 12 km to the east of Chernihiv. The length of the river is 253 km (157 mi). The area of its drainage basin is 8,700 km^{2} (3,400 sq mi). The Snov freezes in November – late January and stays icebound until March – early April. Part of the river forms the Russia–Ukraine border.

According to Ruthenian chronicles, in 1068, a battle took place at the Snov River between Duke of Chernihiv Sviatoslav Yaroslavich and Cumans led by Duke Sharukan.

=== Climate ===
Chernihiv has a humid continental climate (Köppen Dfb) with cold, cloudy and snowy winters, and warm, sunny summers. The average annual temperature for Chernihiv is 7.0 °C (44.6 °F), ranging from a low of −5.6 °C (21.9 °F) in January to a high of 19.5 °C (67.1 °F) in July. Precipitation is well distributed throughout the year though precipitation is higher during the summer months and lower during the winter months. The record high was 41.1 °C (106.0 °F) and the record low was −36.0 °C (−32.8 °F).

Climate data for Chernihiv (1991–2020, extremes 1948–present)
Month	Jan	Feb	Mar	Apr	May	Jun	Jul	Aug	Sep	Oct	Nov	Dec	Year
Record high °C (°F)	12.1 (53.8)	16.2 (61.2)	24.6 (76.3)	29.7 (85.5)	33.5 (92.3)	36.0 (96.8)	41.1 (106.0)	38.2 (100.8)	35.5 (95.9)	27.8 (82.0)	18.4 (65.1)	13.1 (55.6)	41.1 (106.0)
Mean daily maximum °C (°F)	−1.7 (28.9)	−0.2 (31.6)	5.7 (42.3)	14.5 (58.1)	20.8 (69.4)	24.3 (75.7)	26.3 (79.3)	25.6 (78.1)	19.5 (67.1)	12.2 (54.0)	4.3 (39.7)	−0.4 (31.3)	12.6 (54.7)
Daily mean °C (°F)	−4.2 (24.4)	−3.4 (25.9)	1.4 (34.5)	9.0 (48.2)	15.0 (59.0)	18.6 (65.5)	20.5 (68.9)	19.3 (66.7)	13.8 (56.8)	7.5 (45.5)	1.7 (35.1)	−2.7 (27.1)	8.0 (46.4)
Mean daily minimum °C (°F)	−6.6 (20.1)	−6.3 (20.7)	−2.3 (27.9)	3.9 (39.0)	9.4 (48.9)	13.0 (55.4)	15.0 (59.0)	13.6 (56.5)	8.8 (47.8)	3.6 (38.5)	−0.7 (30.7)	−4.9 (23.2)	3.9 (39.0)
Record low °C (°F)	−36 (−33)	−33.9 (−29.0)	−29.9 (−21.8)	−13.9 (7.0)	−3.3 (26.1)	1.1 (34.0)	4.6 (40.3)	2.0 (35.6)	−4.3 (24.3)	−10.8 (12.6)	−23.5 (−10.3)	−28 (−18)	−36 (−33)
Average precipitation mm (inches)	37 (1.5)	38 (1.5)	35 (1.4)	36 (1.4)	63 (2.5)	62 (2.4)	74 (2.9)	54 (2.1)	53 (2.1)	49 (1.9)	46 (1.8)	46 (1.8)	593 (23.3)
Average precipitation days (≥ 1.0 mm)	8.9	9.2	8.4	6.3	8.9	8.3	8.9	6.4	7.1	7.6	8.5	9.8	98.3
Average snowy days	16	13	8	2	0	0	0	0	0	2	8	15	64
Average relative humidity (%)	85.2	81.7	75.0	69.4	65.8	67.6	69.5	68.5	74.4	80.6	86.8	87.1	75.6
Mean monthly sunshine hours	46	71	140	197	275	300	300	275	189	120	42	35	1,990
Source 1: Pogoda.ru
Source 2: NOAA (humidity/precipitation/sun 1991-2020), Weatherbase (snow days)

== Architecture ==
Chernihiv's architectural monuments chronicle the two most flourishing periods in the city's history – those of Kievan Rus' (11th and 12th centuries) and of the Cossack Hetmanate (late 17th and early 18th centuries).

The oldest church in the city and one of the oldest churches in Ukraine is the 5-domed Transfiguration Cathedral, commissioned in the early 1030s by Mstislav the Bold and completed several decades later by his brother, Yaroslav the Wise. The Cathedral of Sts Boris and Gleb, dating from the mid-12th century, was much rebuilt in succeeding periods, before being restored to its original shape in the 20th century. Likewise built in brick, it has a single dome and six pillars.

The crowning achievement of Chernihiv masters was the exquisite Piatnytska Church, constructed at the turn of the 12th and 13th centuries. This graceful building was seriously damaged in the Second World War; its original medieval outlook was reconstructed to a design by Pyotr Baranovsky.

The historic center of Chernihiv has been on the UNESCO World Heritage Tentative List since 1989, but currently the creation of a renewed nomination is underway.

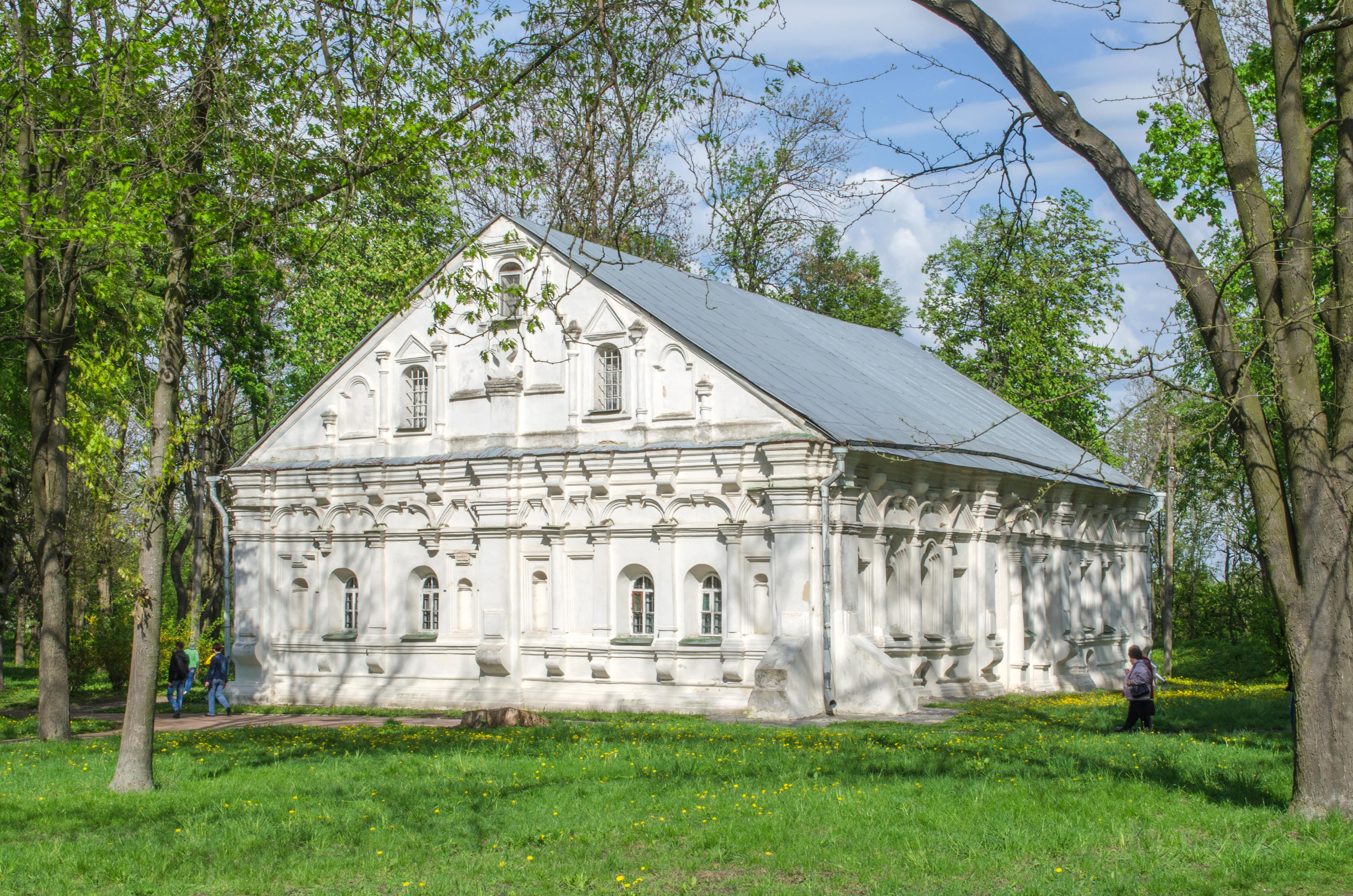
Regimental Chancellery building

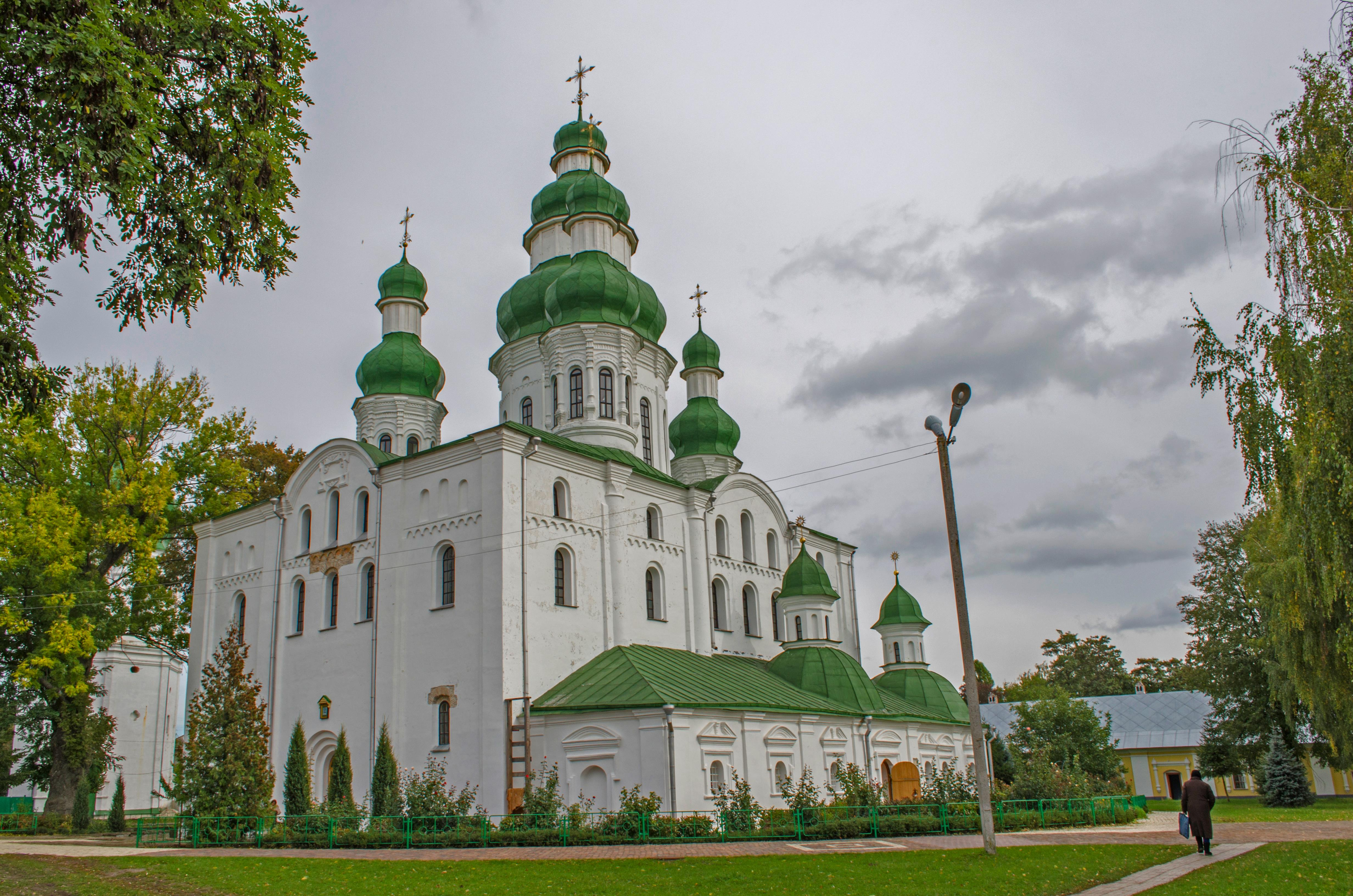
Yeletsky monastery cathedral was modeled after that of Kyiv Pechersk Lavra. Note the contrast between its austere 12th-century walls and baroque 17th-century domes.

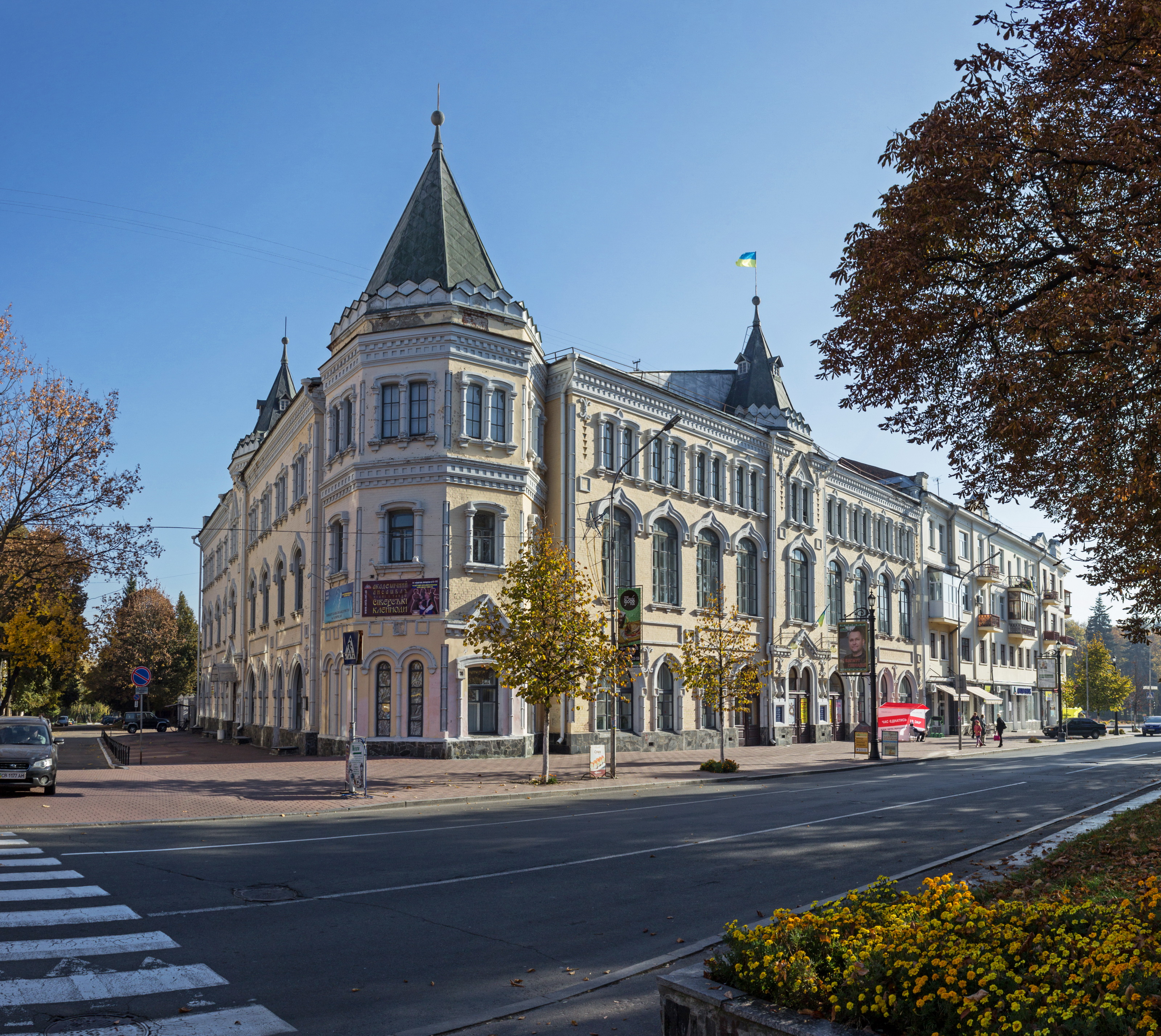
Chernihiv Philharmony

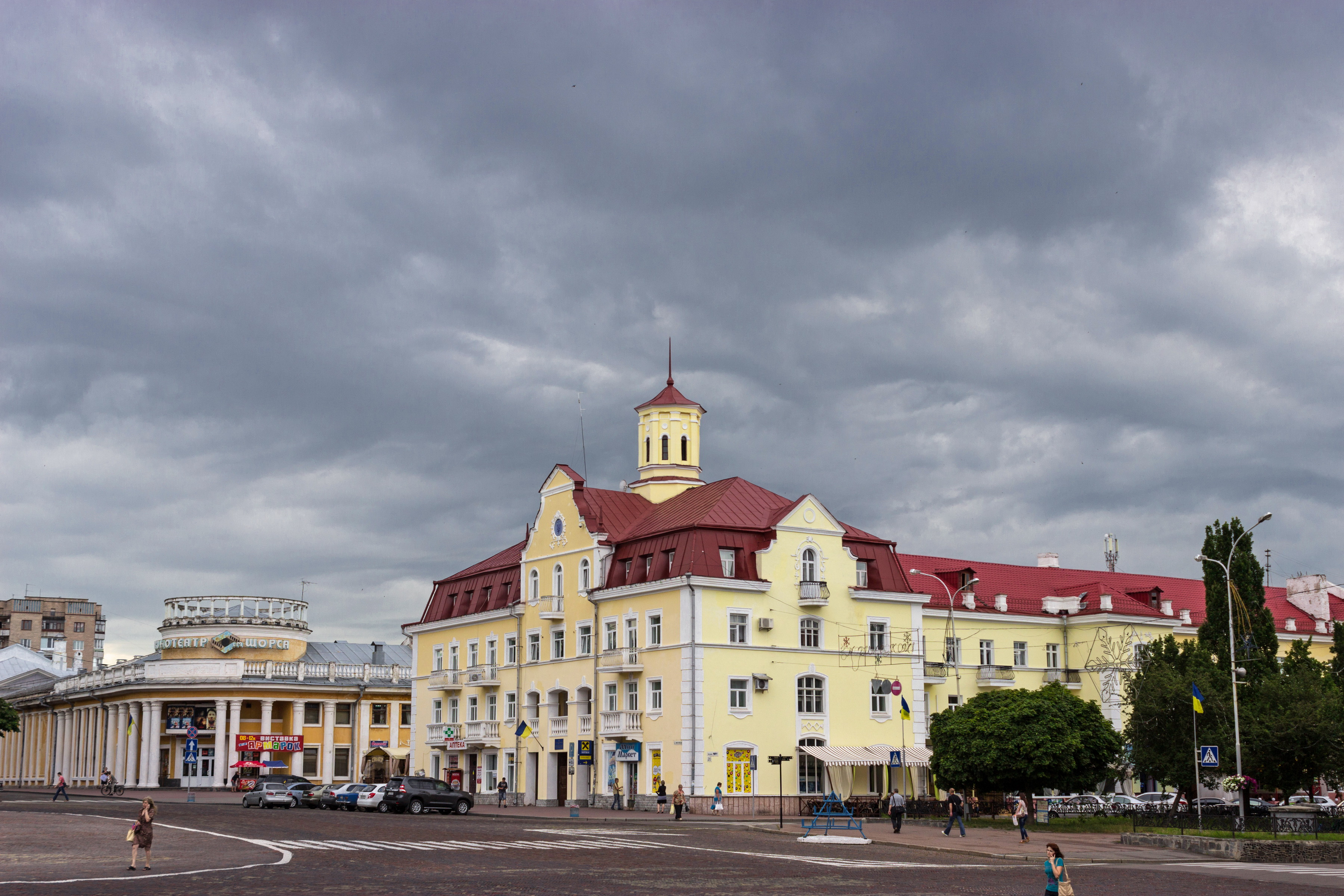
Hotel Desna

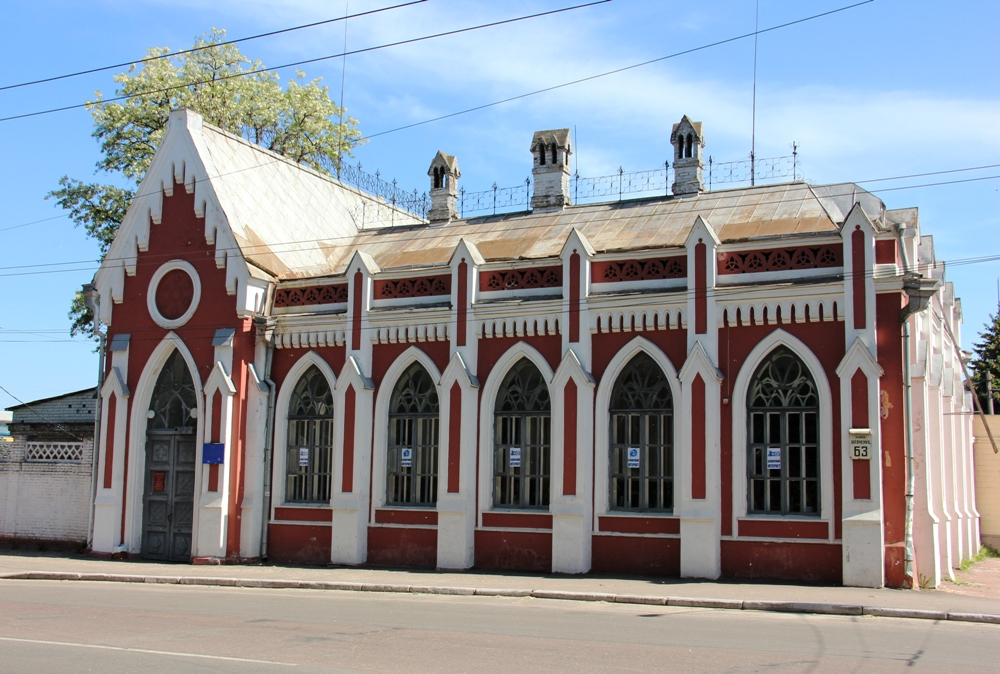
Tarnovsky Museum of Antiquities

The earliest residential buildings in the downtown date from the late 17th century, a period when a Cossack regiment was deployed there. Two most representative residences are those of Polkovnyk Lyzohub (1690s) and Polkovnyk Polubotok (18th century). The former mansion, popularly known as the Mazepa House, used to contain the regiment's chancellery. One of the most profusely decorated Cossack structures is undoubtedly the ecclesiastical collegium, surmounted by a bell-tower (1702). The archbishop's residence was constructed nearby in the 1780s. St. Catherine Church (1715), with its 5 gilded pear domes, traditional for Ukrainian architecture, is thought to have been intended as a memorial to the regiment's exploits during the storm of Azov in 1696.

=== Monasteries ===
All through the most trying periods of its history, Chernihiv retained its ecclesiastical importance as the seat of either a bishopric or an archbishopric. At the outskirts of the modern city lie two ancient cave monasteries formerly used as the bishops' residences.

The caves of the Yeletskyi Monastery are said to predate those of the Kyiv Pechersk Lavra (Kyiv Monastery of the Caves). Its magnificent six-pillared cathedral was erected at the turn of the 11th to 12th centuries; some traces of its 750-year-old murals may still be seen in the interior. After the domes collapsed in 1611, they were augmented and reconstructed in the Ukrainian Baroque style. The wall, monastic cells, and bell-tower all date from the 17th century.

The nearby mother superior's house is thought to be the oldest residential building in the Left-Bank Ukraine. The cloister's holiest icon used to be that of Theotokos, who made her epiphany to Sviatoslav of Chernigov on 6 February 1060. The icon, called Yeletskaya after the fir wood it was painted upon, was taken to Moscow by Svyatoslav's descendants, the Baryatinsky family, in 1579.

The nearby Chernihiv Glory Memorial marks the location of the ancient Saint Anthony Caves of Saint Elijah Monastery (also known as the Yeletskyi Monastery), part of a spiritual complex founded by Saint Anthony of the Caves in the mid-11th century, around the same time as the Kyiv Pechersk Lavra. The Yeletskyi caves served as monastic quarters and a site of retreat for early monks and bishops. The site includes the modest Church of Saint Elijah, built above the cave entrance, with architectural elements dating to the 12th century.

The roomy Trinity Cathedral, one of the most imposing monuments of Cossack Baroque, was erected between 1679 and 1689. Its refectory, with the adjoining Church of the Presentation to the Temple, was completed by 1679. Surrounding the monastery are 17th-century towered walls, preserved monastic cells, and a five-tiered bell tower dating to the 1780s.

Other historic abbeys in the vicinity of Chernihiv include those in Kozelets and Hustynia, which feature superb examples of Ukrainian Baroque monastic architecture and iconography.

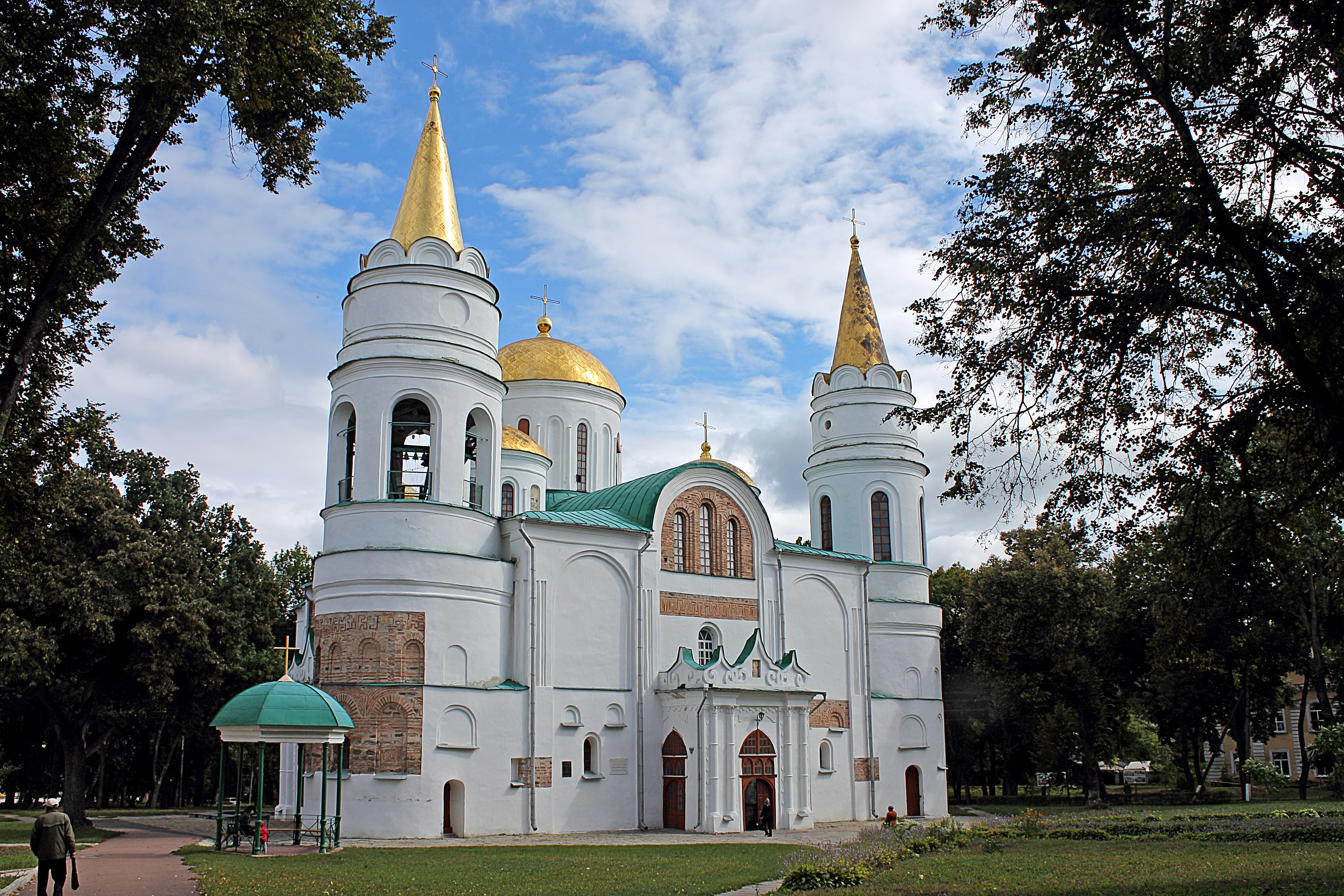
The Savior Transfiguration Cathedral of Chernihiv (1030s) is the oldest in Ukraine.

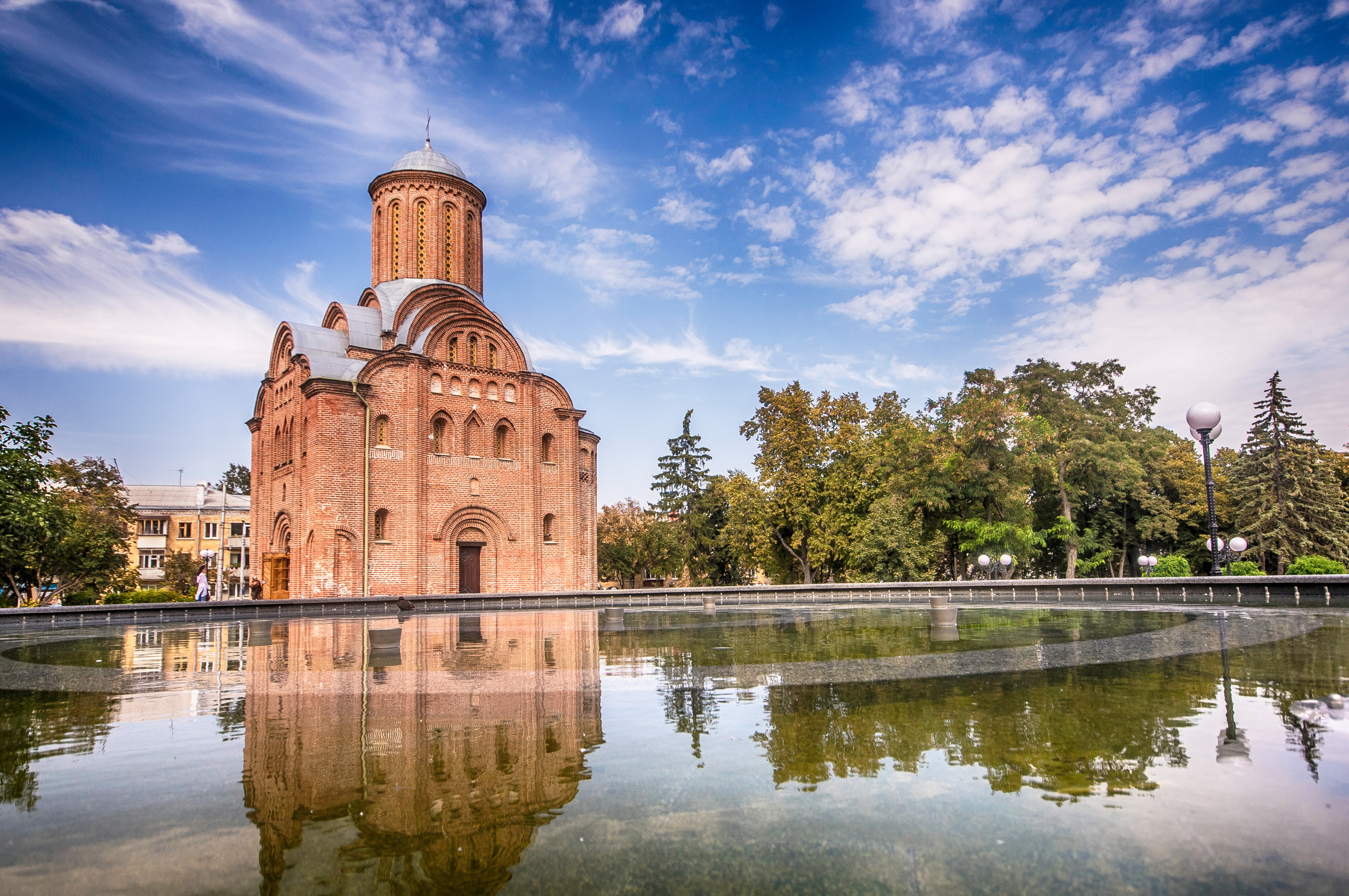
Piatnytska Church of Saint Paraskevi (c. 1201, restored after World War II).

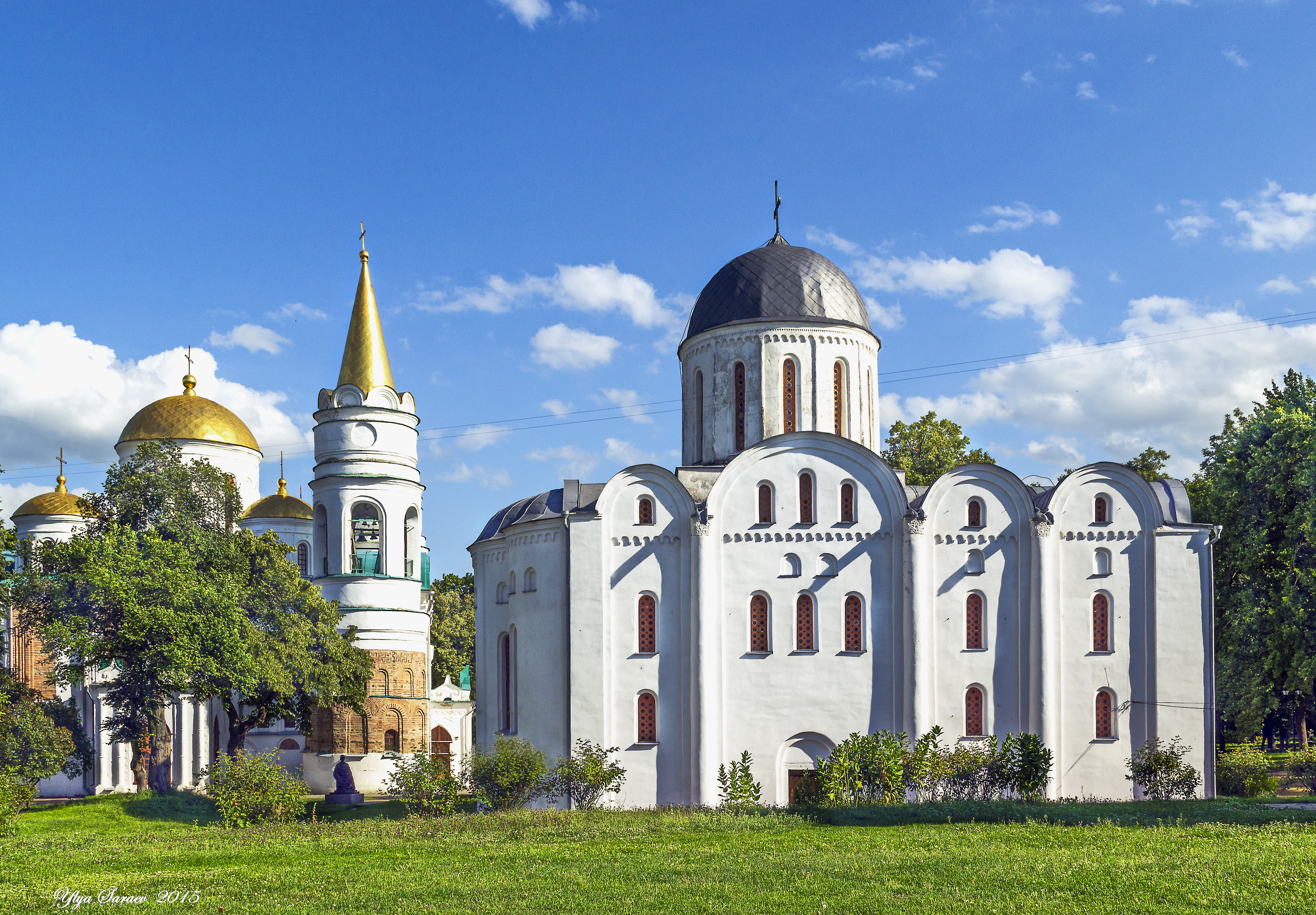
Borysohlibskyi Cathedral (1120s)

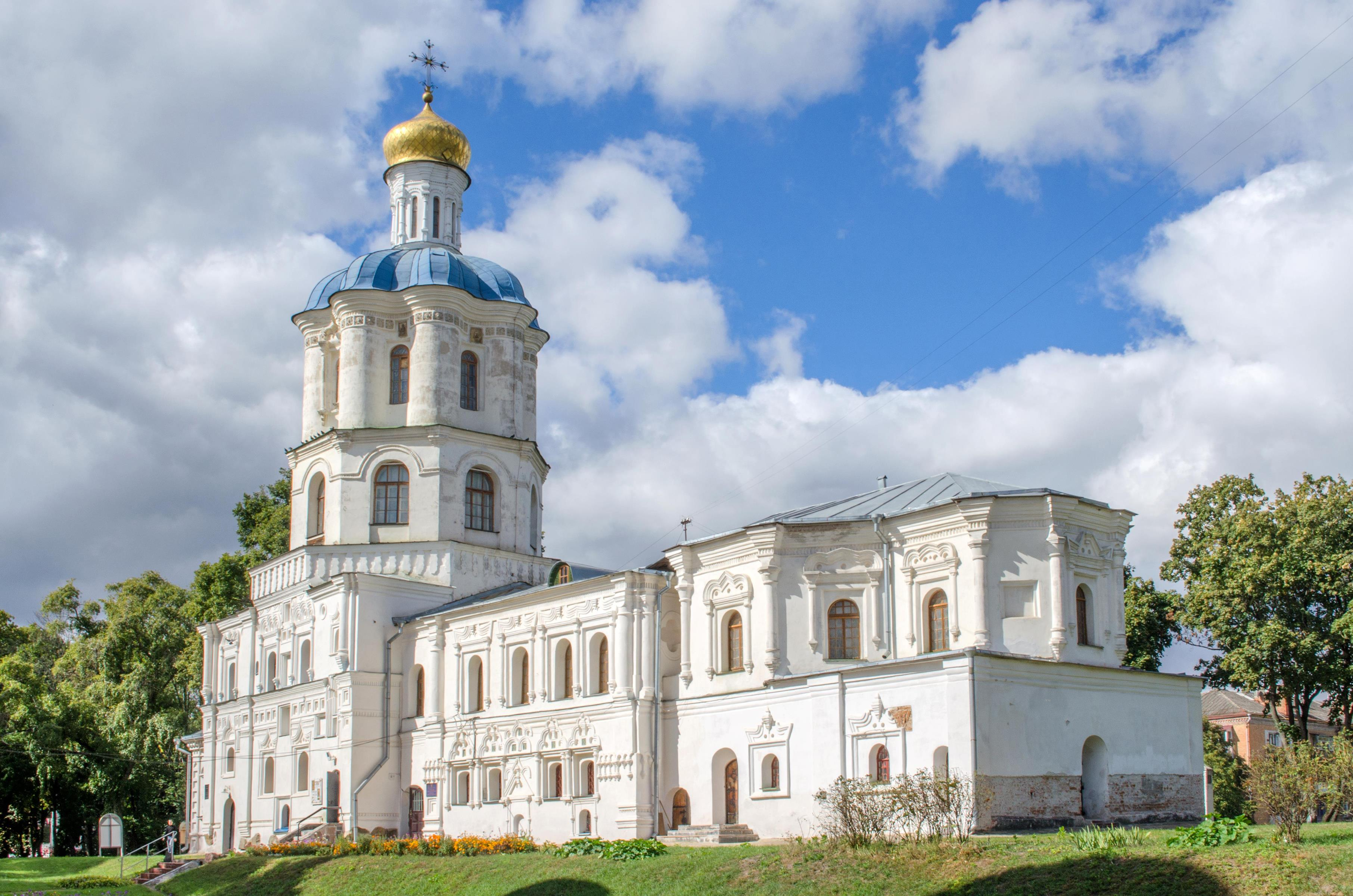
Chernihiv Collegium (1700s)

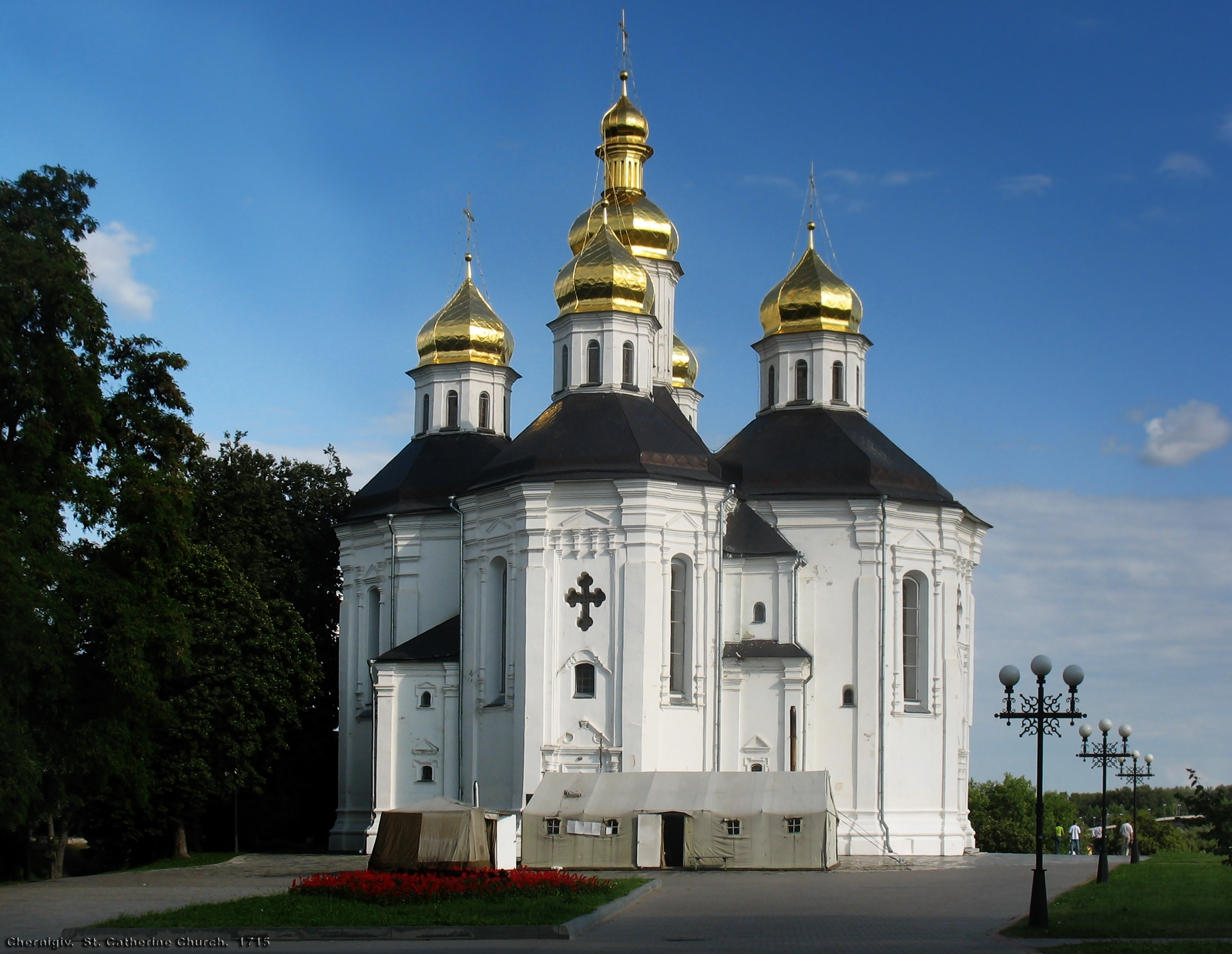
Catherine's Church (1715s)

The nearby Chernihiv Glory Memorial we can find Saint Anthony Caves of Saint Elijah and the Holy Trinity features a small eponymous church, built 800 years ago. The roomy Trinity cathedral, one of the most imposing monuments of Cossack baroque, was erected between 1679 and 1689. Its refectory, with the adjoining church of Presentation to the Temple, was finished by 1679. There are also the 17th-century towered walls, monastic cells, and the five-tiered belfry from the 1780s.

== Economy ==
=== Industry ===
Cheksil, one of the largest enterprises in the Ukrainian textile industry, is based in Chernihiv. The first stage of the plant was put into operation in 1963. The city also has the Chernihiv Musical Instrument Factory established in 1933. In 1995 a manufacturer of goods for animals, called COLLAR Company, was established by Yuri Sinitsa.

== Education ==
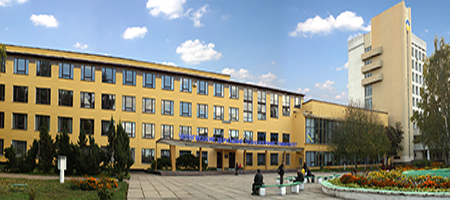
Chernihiv National University of Technology

Chernihiv has the Chernihiv Polytechnic National University and Taras Shevchenko National University "Chernihiv College".

== Transport ==
=== Train ===
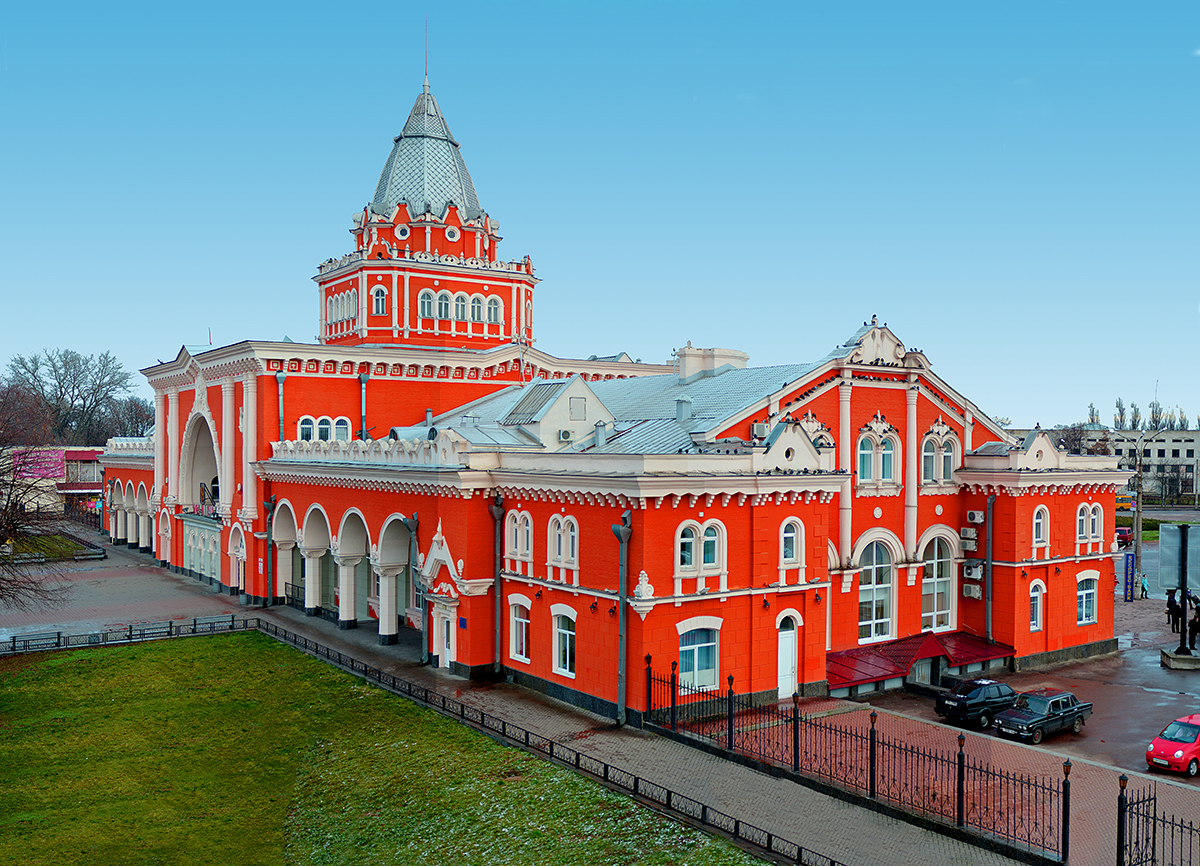
Chernihiv Ovruch railway in Chernihiv

Chernihiv has a train station with bus station called Chernihiv Ovruch railway. Narrow gauge railway of 76 versts was laid from the Kruty station of the Moscow Kyiv-Voronezh railway towards Chernihiv. In 1893, on the left bank of the Desna River, in the area of a modern automobile bridge, a railway station was built along the Kyiv highway. Passengers were delivered here from the city and back by horse transport.

In 1925, traffic was opened on the Nizhyn to Chernigiv section of the Southwest Railway. But rail transport in Chernihiv was postponed until 1928. The bridge over the Desna River was not ready and trains still arrived on the left bank, where the old narrow-gauge railway station was located, and passengers got to Chernihiv by road bridge. According to 2006 data, the volume of freight traffic is 84,737 wagons per year. Over 4.5 million passengers are transported each year.

However, the condition of the rolling stock and the quality of the services provided do not meet modern requirements. Since the introduction of the new high-speed train timetable, the trailed wagons of the 93/94 Chernihiv – Odesa train were canceled. As of 2015, regular trains from Minsk to Odesa, and from St. Petersburg to Kyiv to Kharkiv run through Chernihiv, and there are direct connections with Moscow. Trains to Crimea (Simferopol, Feodosia) were canceled on 27 December 2014 due to Russia's annexation of Crimea.

=== Air transport ===
The area was served by Chernihiv Shestovytsia Airport, and during the Cold War it was the site of Chernihiv air base. The close airport is in Kyiv at the Boryspil Airport located 143.1 kilometres (89 miles) away, and the smaller, municipally owned Zhuliany Airport located 158.7 km (98.6 mi) away on the southern outskirts of the city of Kyiv.

=== Bus and trolleybus ===
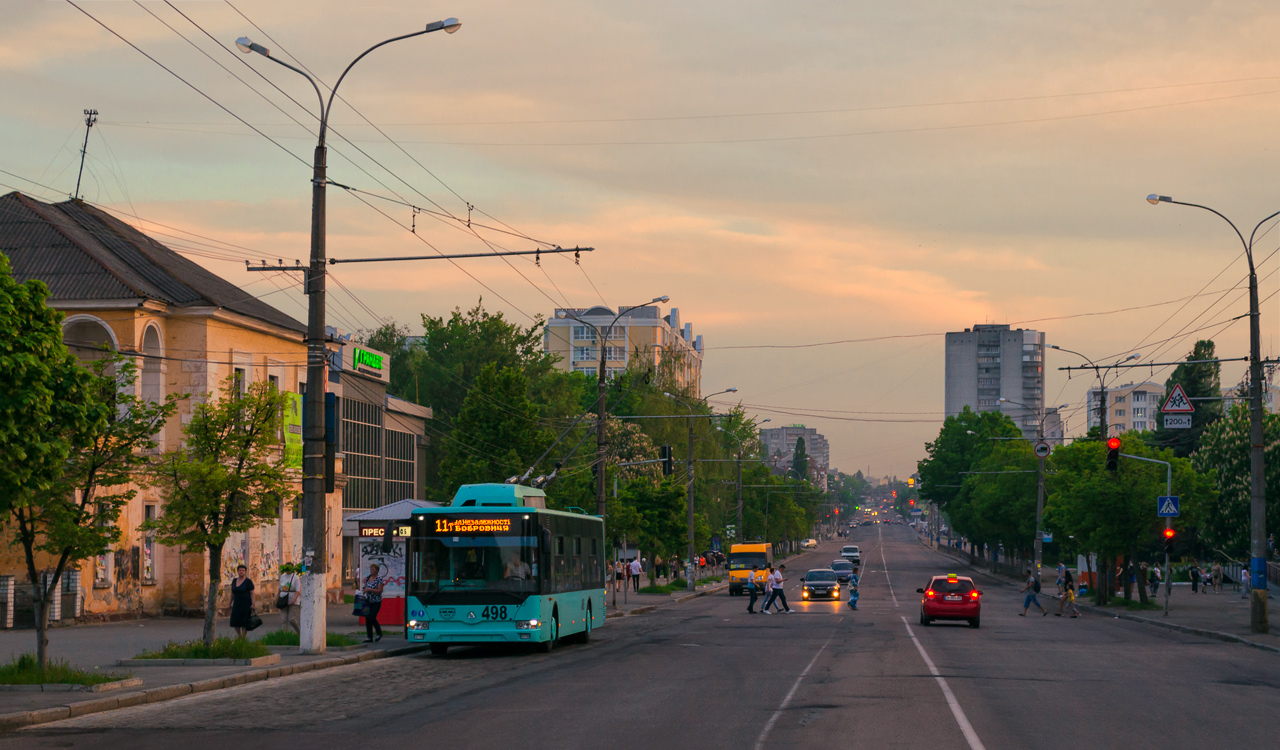
Trolleybus in Chernihiv

A popular transport to Chernihiv from Kyiv is marshrutka from Chernihivska and Lisova metro stations, which go to the centre of Chernihiv, often to Peremohy Avenue. Buses to Novhorod-Siverskyi leave hourly from Chernihiv's Central bus station, located near the Chernihiv train station.

Public transport includes buses and trolleybuses. There is no direct connection between railway station and Chernihiv-1 bus station to the most central sights on the Val. Trolleybus 1 and bus 38 are going to the Drama Theater stop near Piatnytska Church. Different routes come to Hotel Ukraine from different sides.

== Sports and facilities ==
=== FC Desna Chernhiv ===
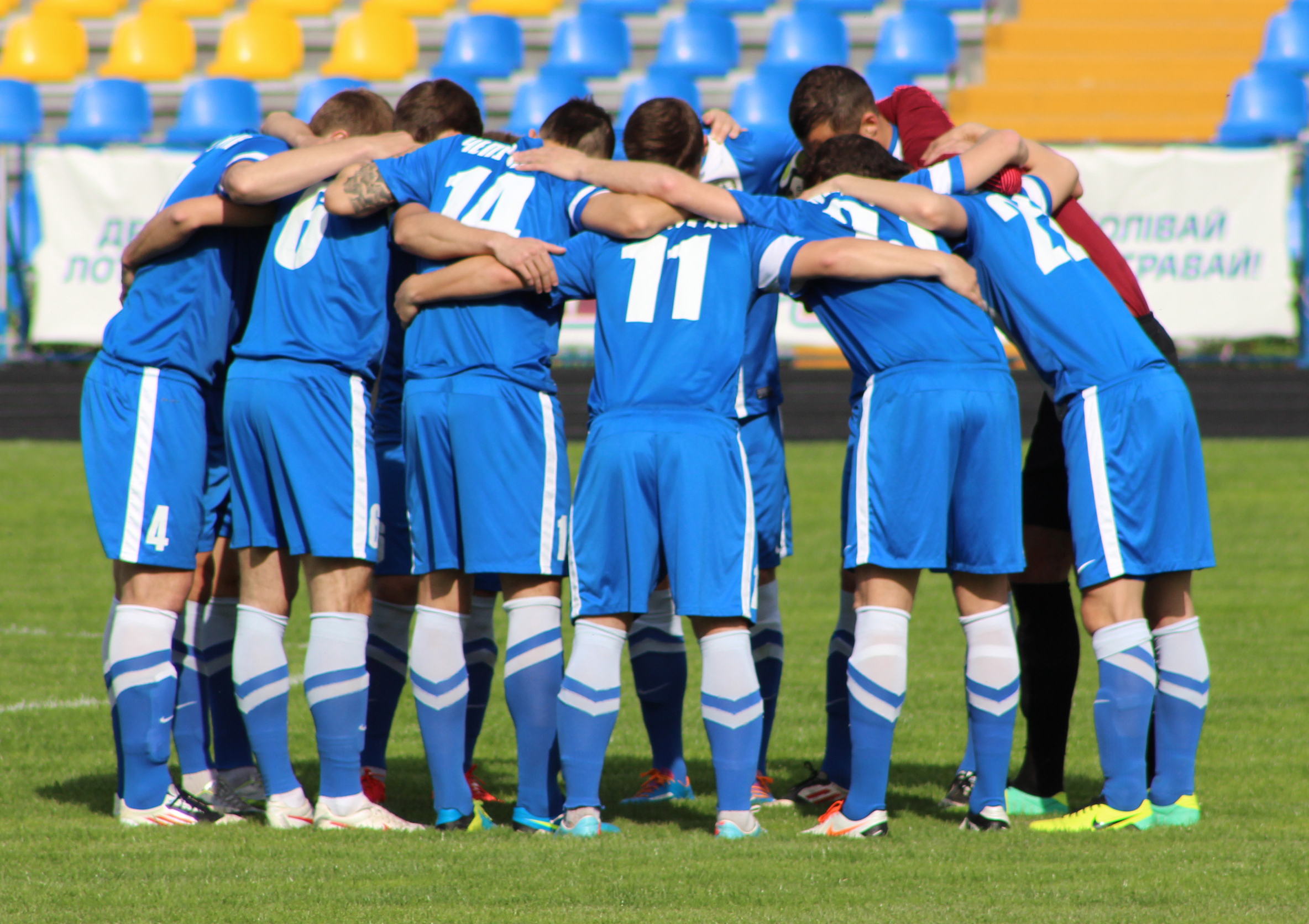
Players of FC Desna Chernihiv 2014-05-22

The main Football club of Chernihiv is called FC Desna Chernihiv, the original name of the club was "Avanhard Chernihiv" during its first year of existence. Between 1961 and 1970 the club was called Desna. In 1972 it was replaced with SC Chernihiv (team of the SKA Kyiv) that played in Chernihiv for the next couple of years. In 1977 Desna was revived now in place of the amateur club "Khimik Cherhihiv" that won regional competitions. On 27 May 2018, the team got promoted to the Ukrainian Premier League for the first time in their history.

The original team colours were blue shirts, blue shorts, blue socks. The team got into the Quarterfinals of the Ukrainian Cup in the season 2017–18 against Dynamo Kyiv. The club and during the season 2019–20 got again into the Quarterfinals of the Ukrainian Cup for the second time of the history of the club. In Premier League in the season 2019–20, Desna got into the play-offs for the Championship round table and qualified mathematically at least for the Europa League third qualifying round, for the first time in the history of the Club since 1960.

=== FC Chernihiv ===
FC Chernihiv is another club in the city of Chernihiv, founded in 2003, which they play in Chernihiv Arena, they won the Chernihiv Oblast Football Championship. The club in 2020, got a certificate for vistup to participate for the Ukrainian Second League for the season 2020–21. For the first time in the entire history, the place will be represented in professional football by two teams, one of which is FC Desna Chernihiv. In 2022 the club was admitted into the Ukrainian First League for the season 2022–23, keeping high the name of the city in the sport sphere.

=== WFC Lehenda-ShVSM Chernihiv ===
WFC Lehenda-ShVSM Chernihiv is Ukrainian professional women's football club from Chernihiv. The team won 6 times the Top Division, four times the Women's Cup and been in both competition second only behind Zhytlobud-1 Kharkiv. The club won also the Italy Women's Cup in 2007. In the 2001–02, 2003–04, 2006–07 seasons they played in the UEFA Women's Cup.

=== Sport complex ===
==== Chernihiv Stadium ====
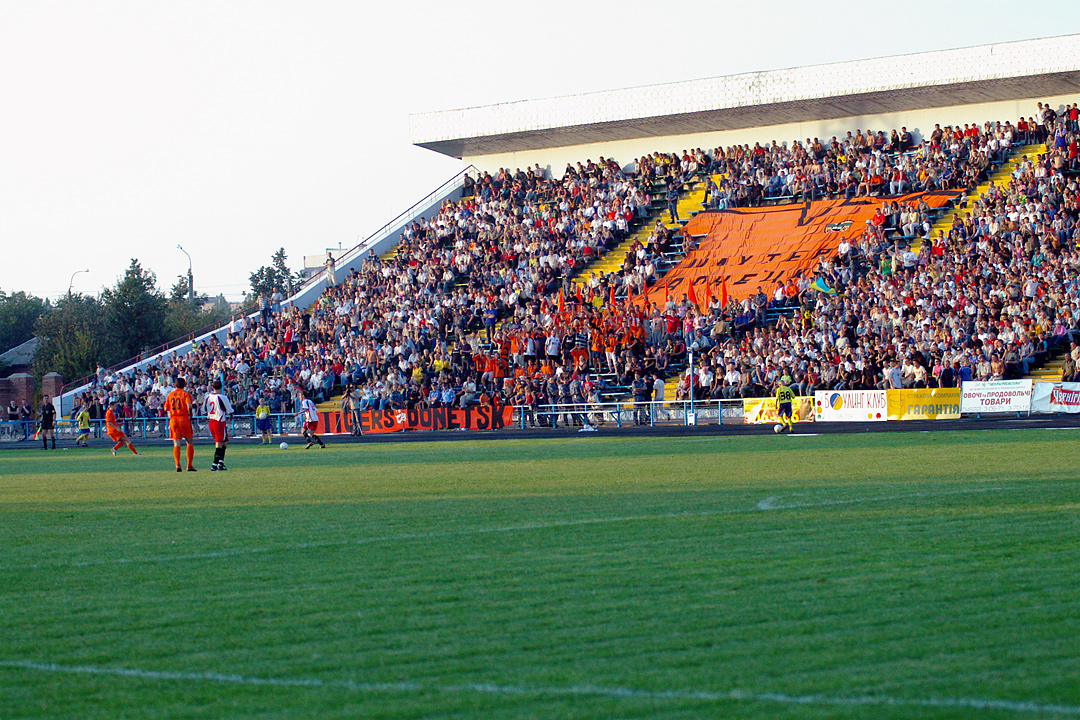
Stadion Yuri Gagarin in Chernihiv

The Club of FC Desna Chernihiv played at the Olympic sports training center "Chernihiv" (formerly Stadion Yuriya Gagarina). The Chernihiv Stadium was built in 1936 for 3,000 spectators in eastern portion of a city park (garden) that exists since 1804 and where previously was located residence of the Chernihiv Archbishops.

==== Chernihiv Arena ====
The city of Chernihiv has also another sport complex called Chernihiv Arena in Kil'tseva St, 2а, Chernihiv, Chernihiv Oblast, Ukraine, 14039. Here play the club FC Chernihiv, WFC Lehenda-ShVSM Chernihiv the Ukrainian professional women's football club of city and sometimes by Desna-2 Chernihiv, Desna-3 Chernihiv.

== Cemeteries ==
- Old Jewish Cemetery
- Old Cemetery
- Yatsevo Cemetery
- Yelovshchyna Cemetery
- Kotovske Cemetery
- Stara Basan Cemetery
- Radomka Cemetery
- Palchyky Selo Cemetery
- Kholmy Ukraine Cemetery

== Gallery ==
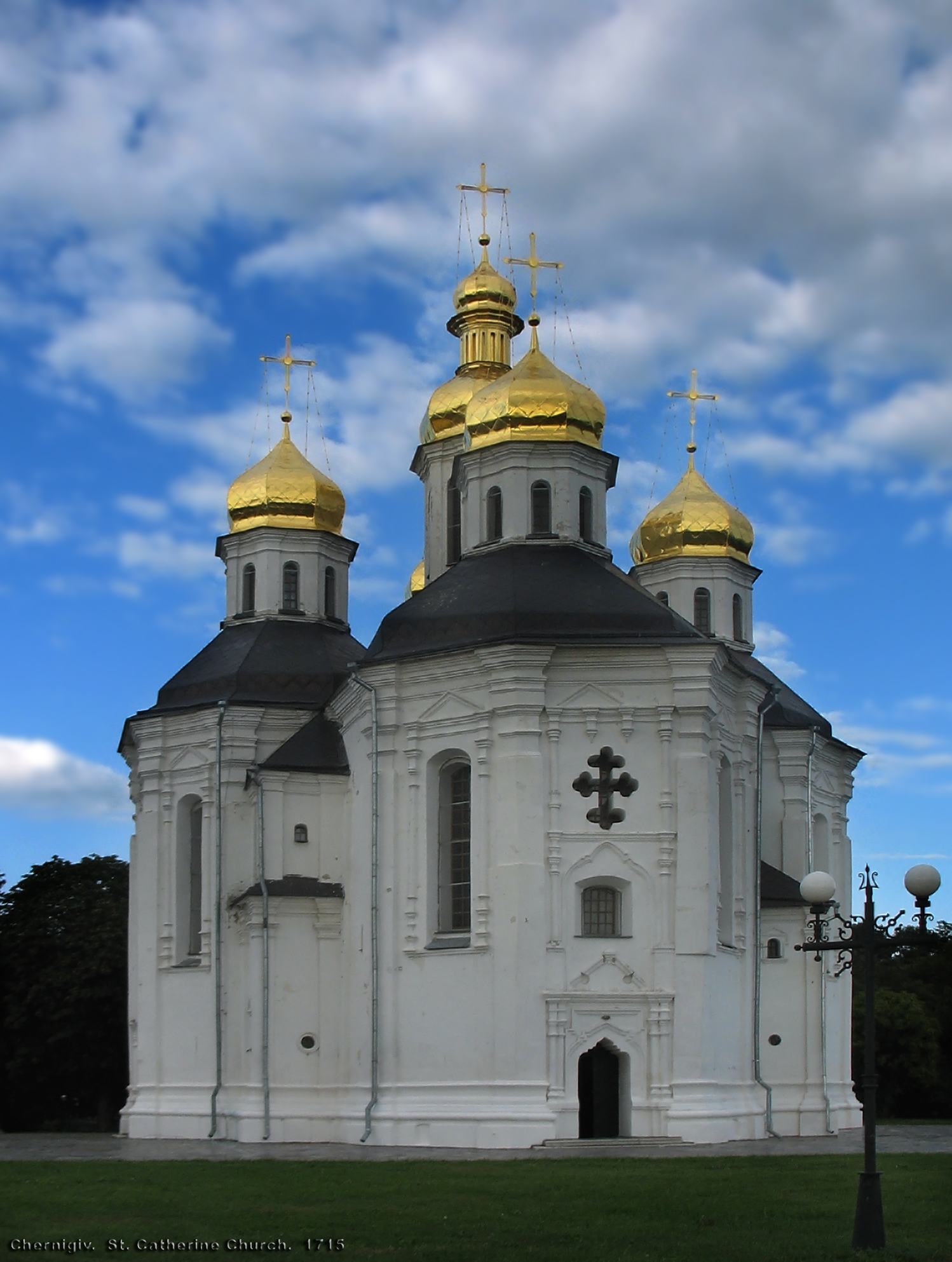
St. Catherine's Church

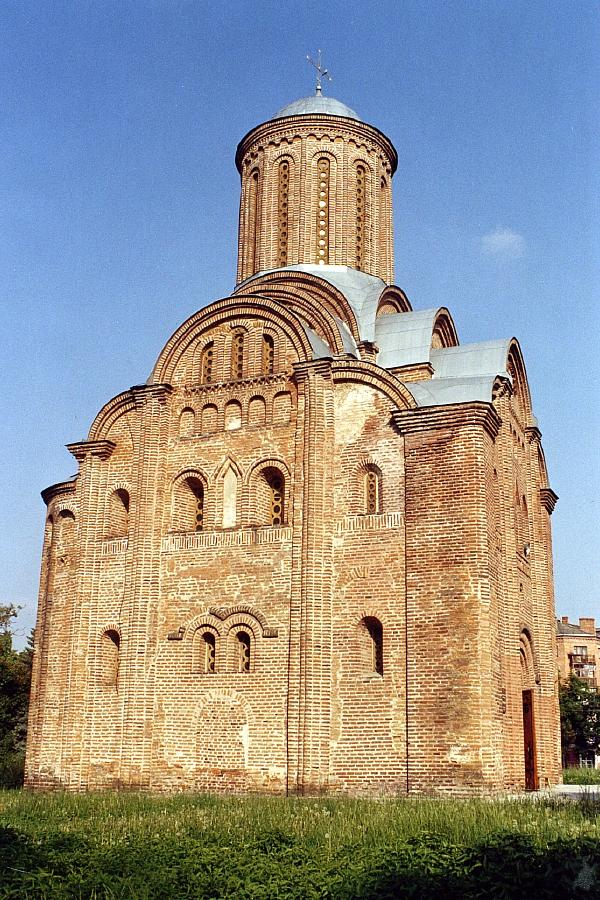
The Piatnytska Church Friday (c. 1201, restored after World War II).

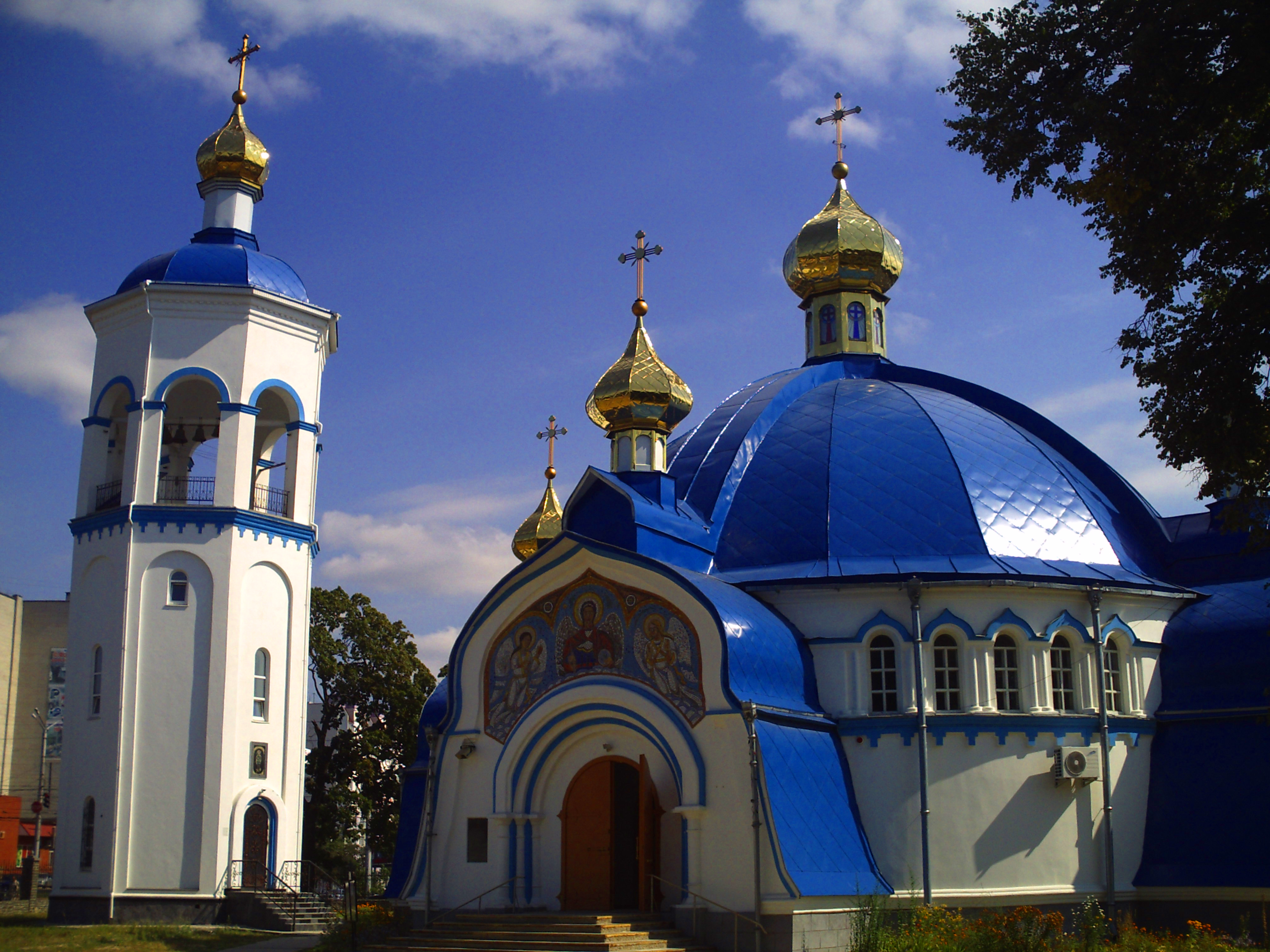
Church of the Archangel Michael

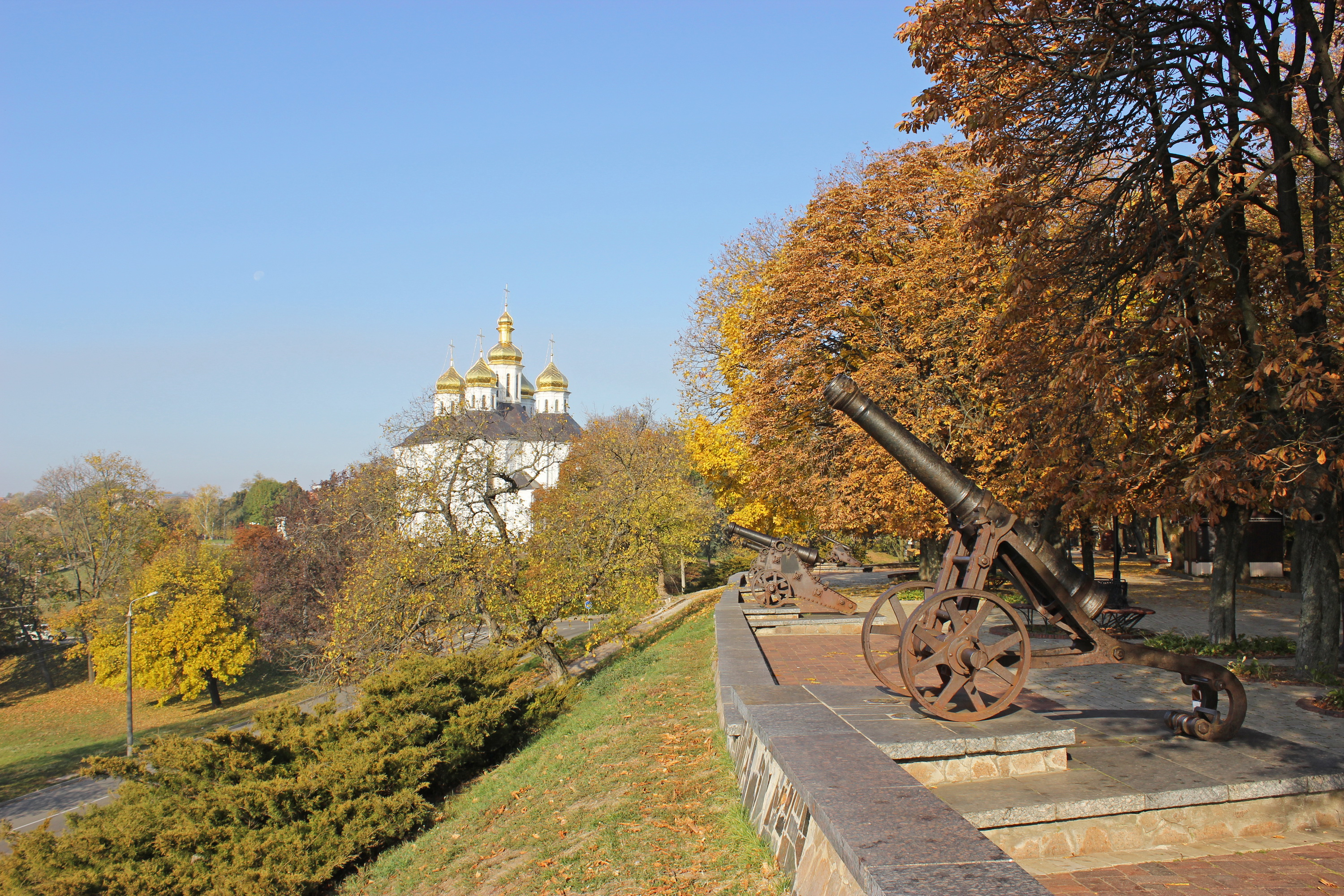
Dytynets Park

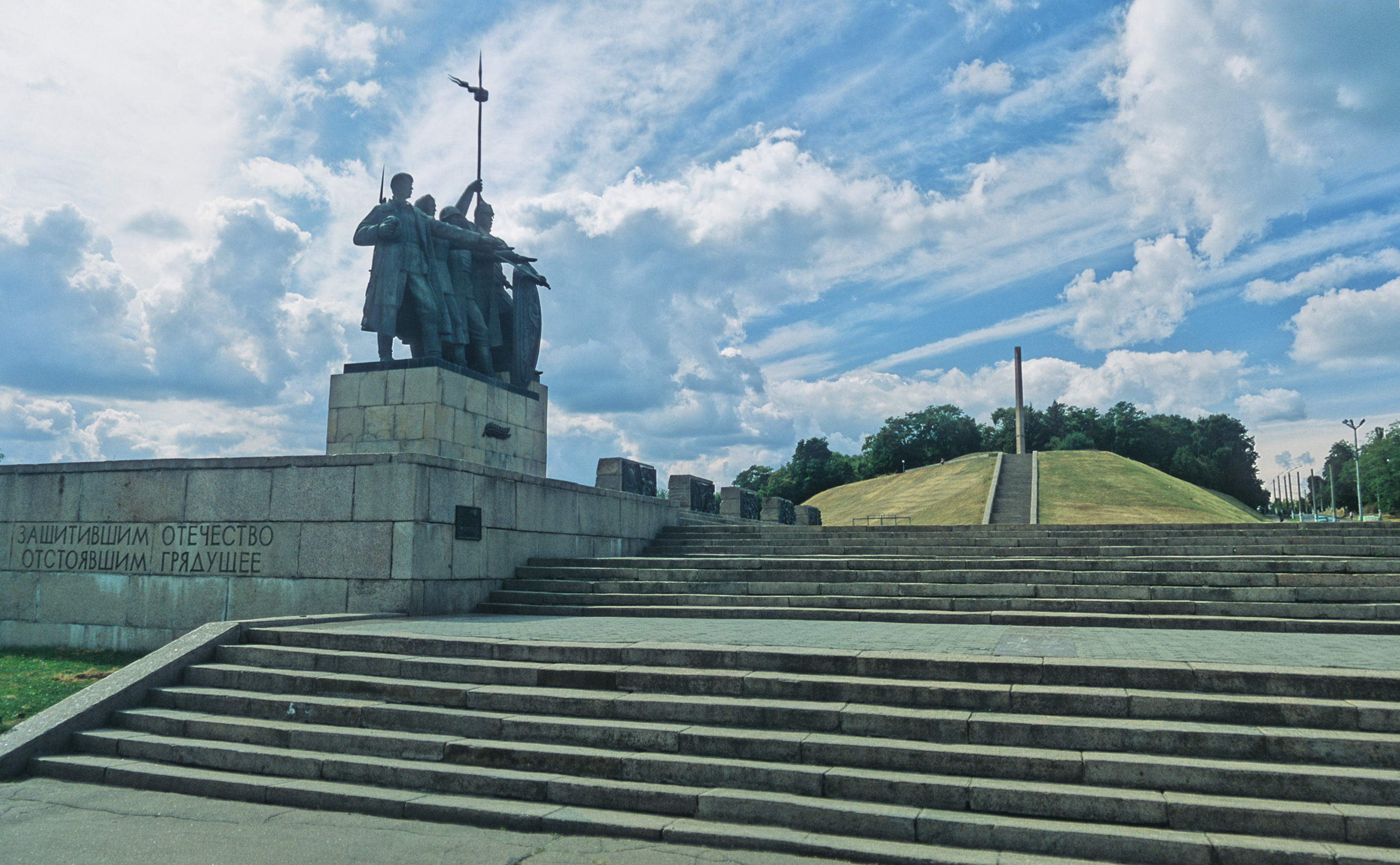
Boldyni Hory

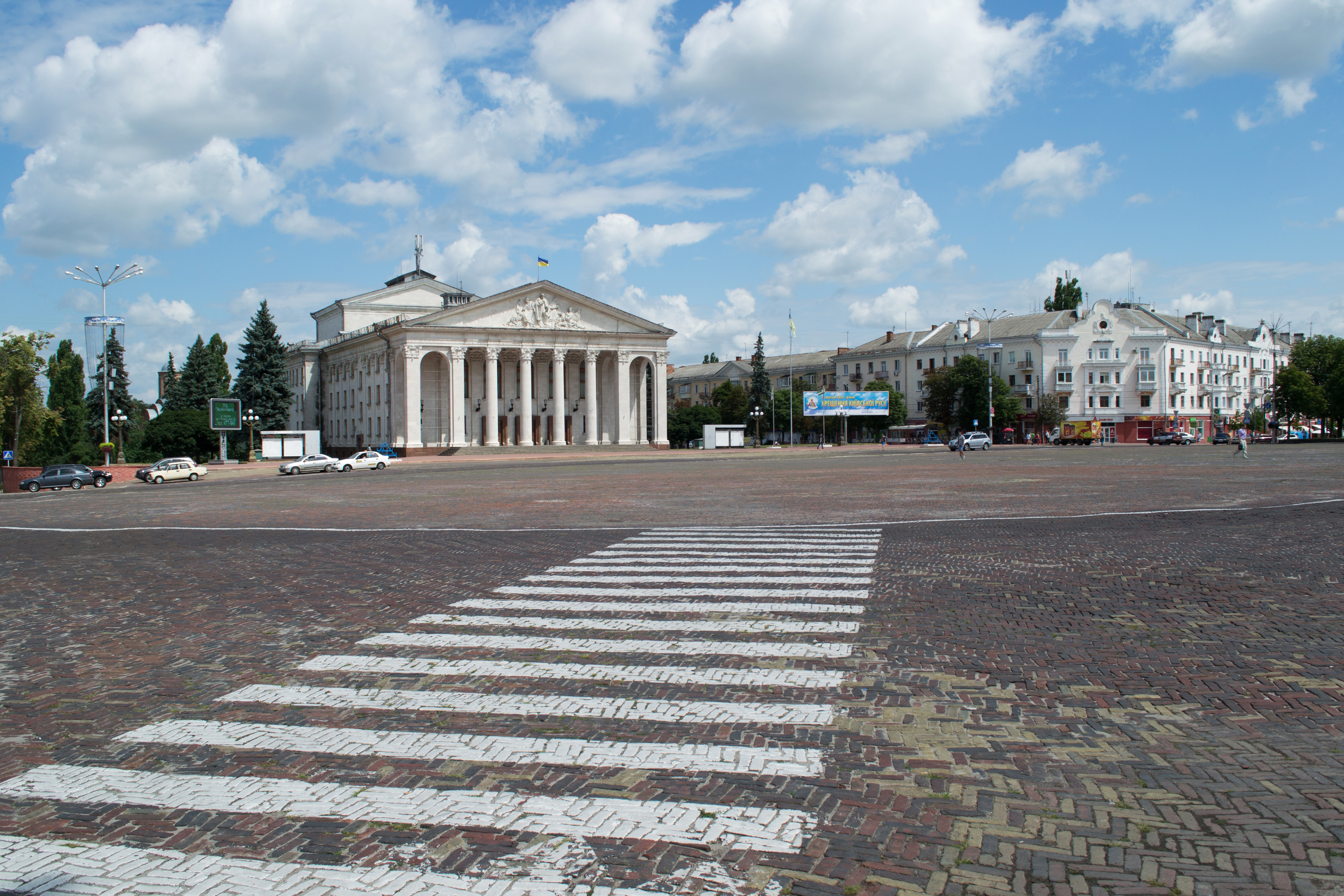
Krasna Square and Shevchenko Theatre

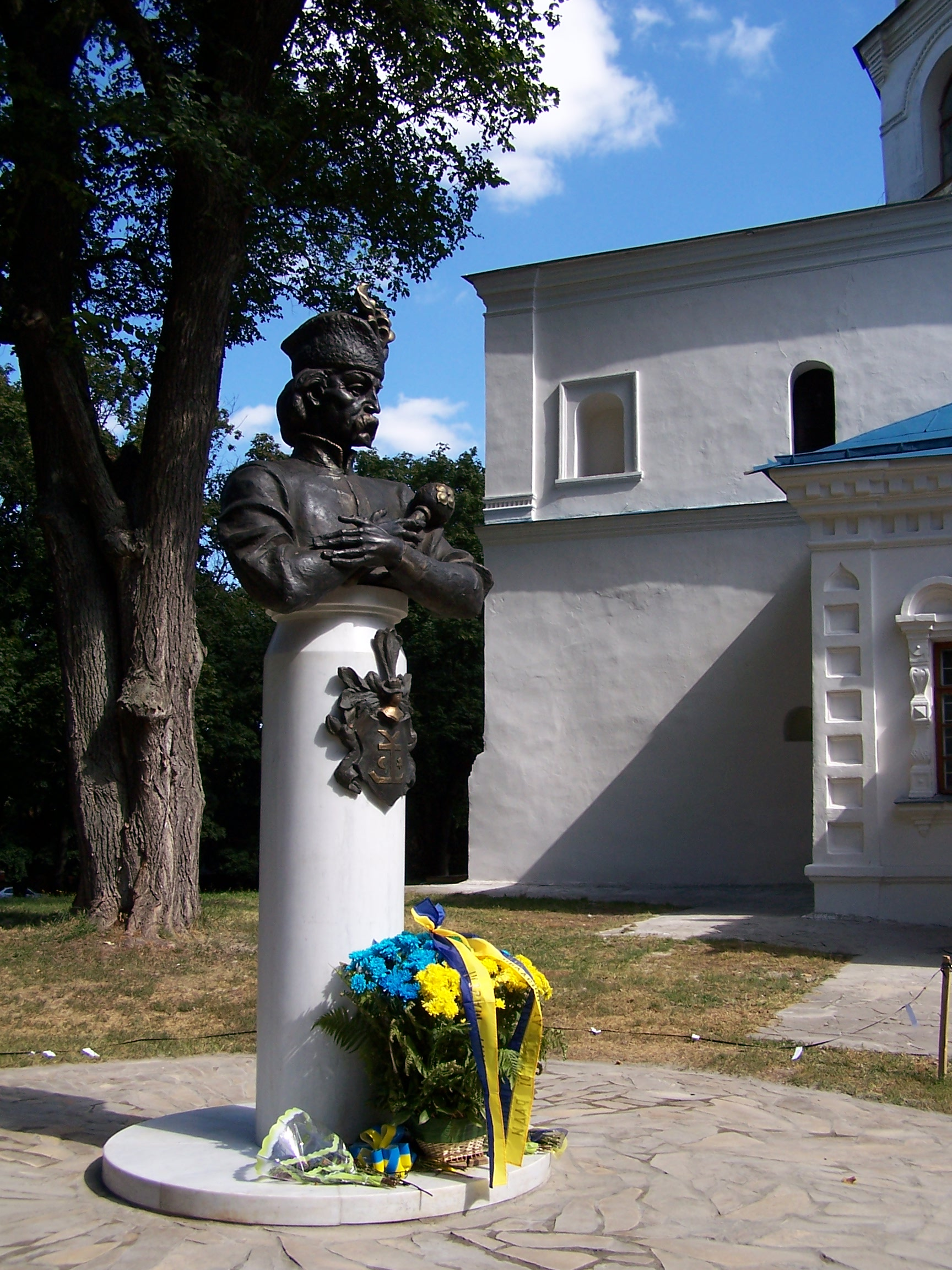
Monument to Hetman Mazepa by Giennadij Jerszow

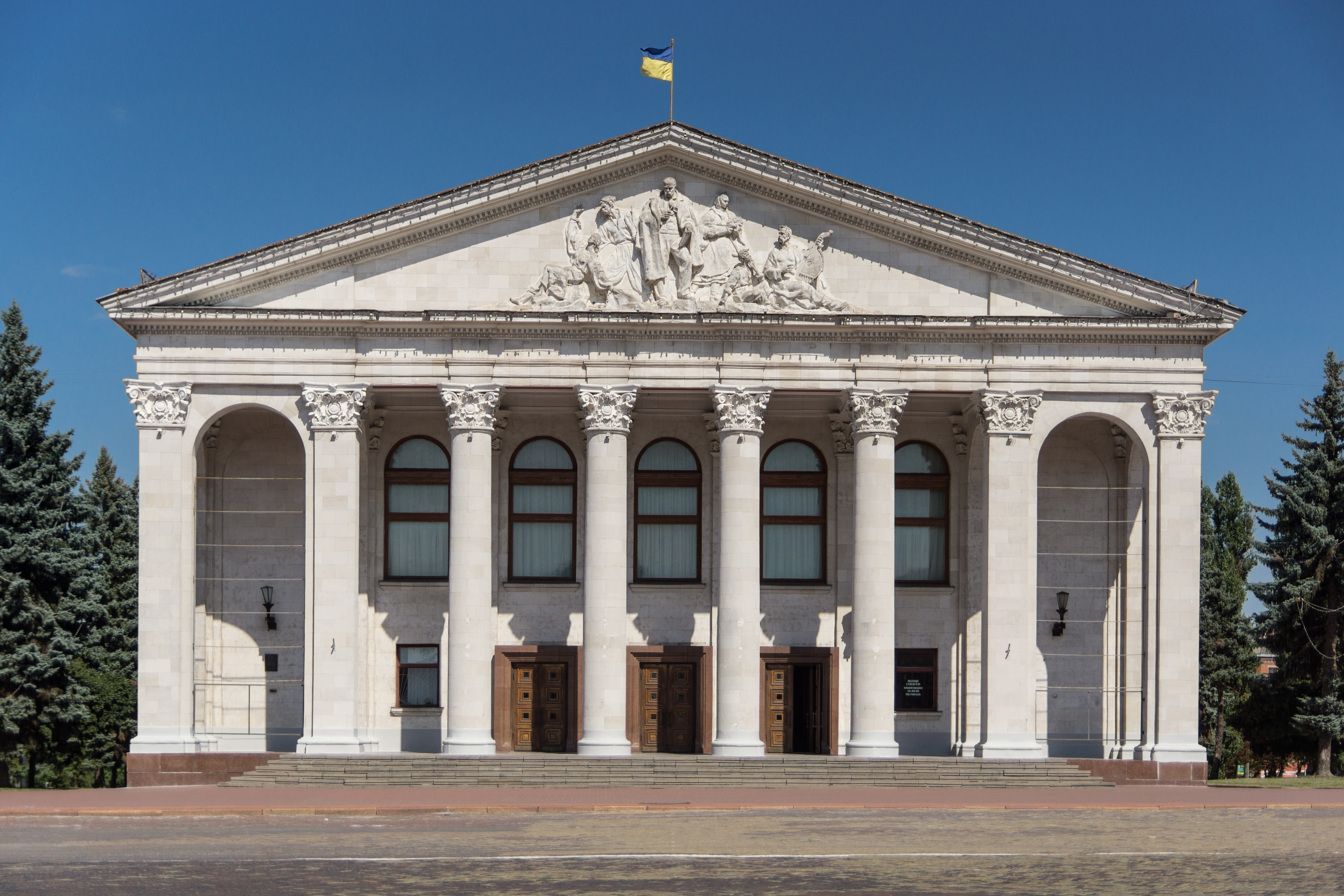
Opera and Drama Theatre, designed by Semyon Fridlin

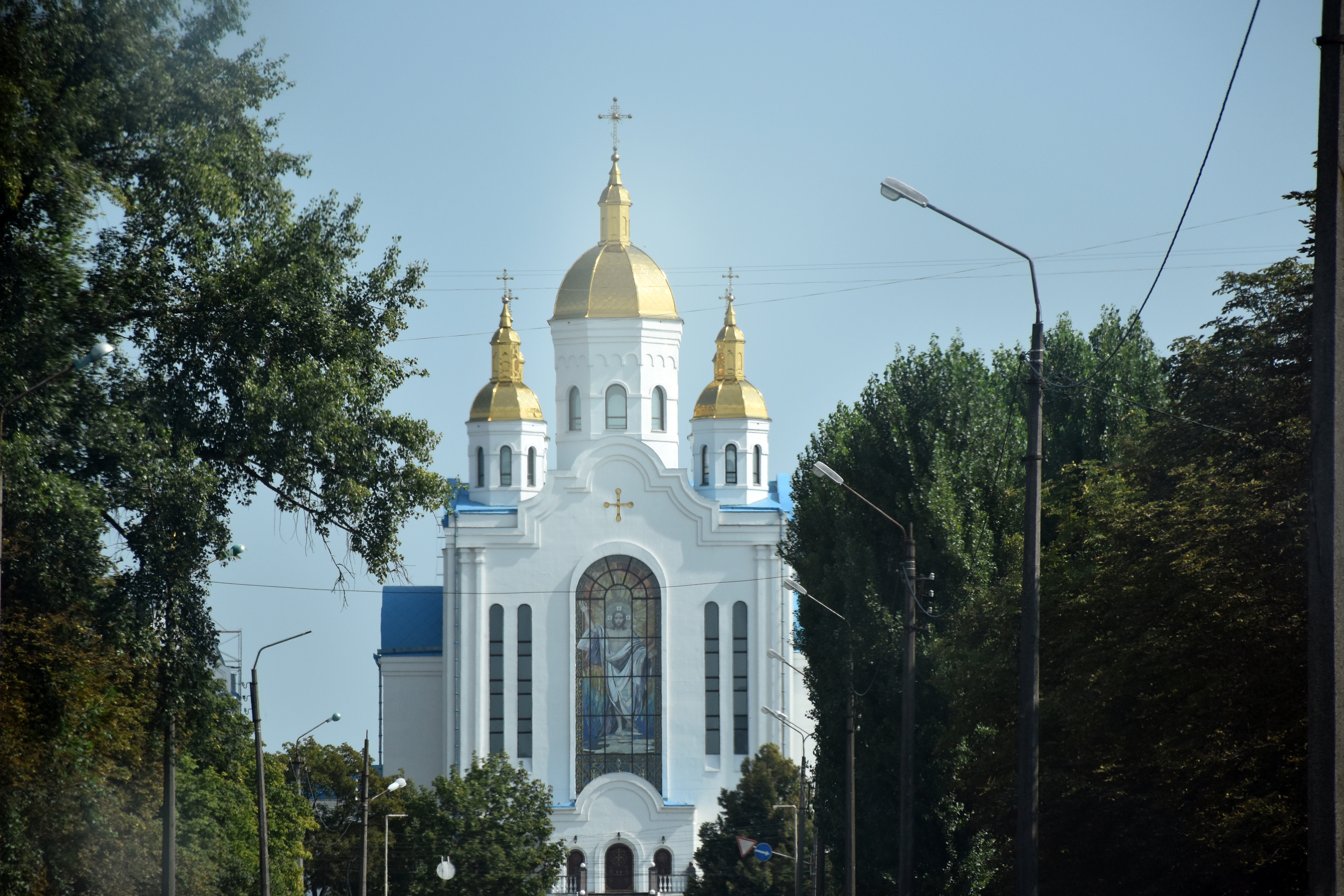
Church of All Saints

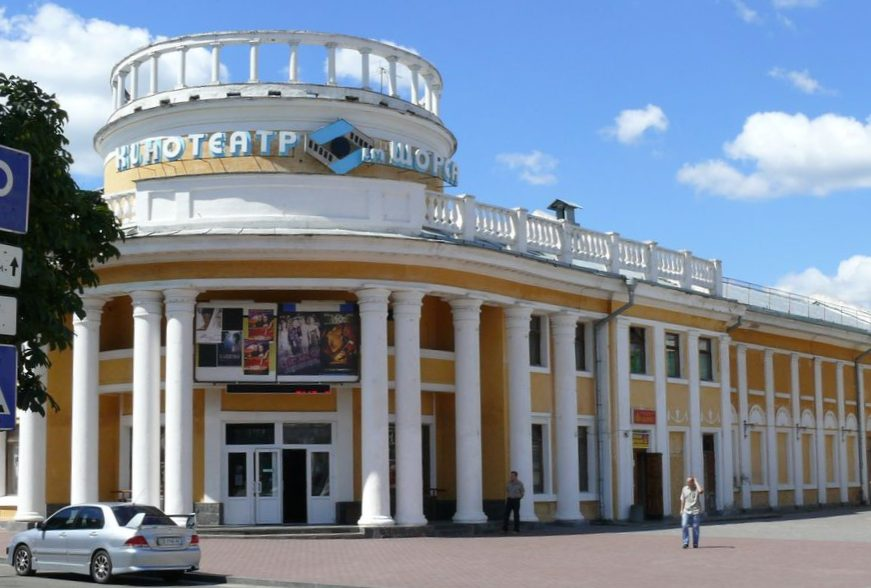
Building of the Chernihiv Regional Youth Center (former Shchors theater)

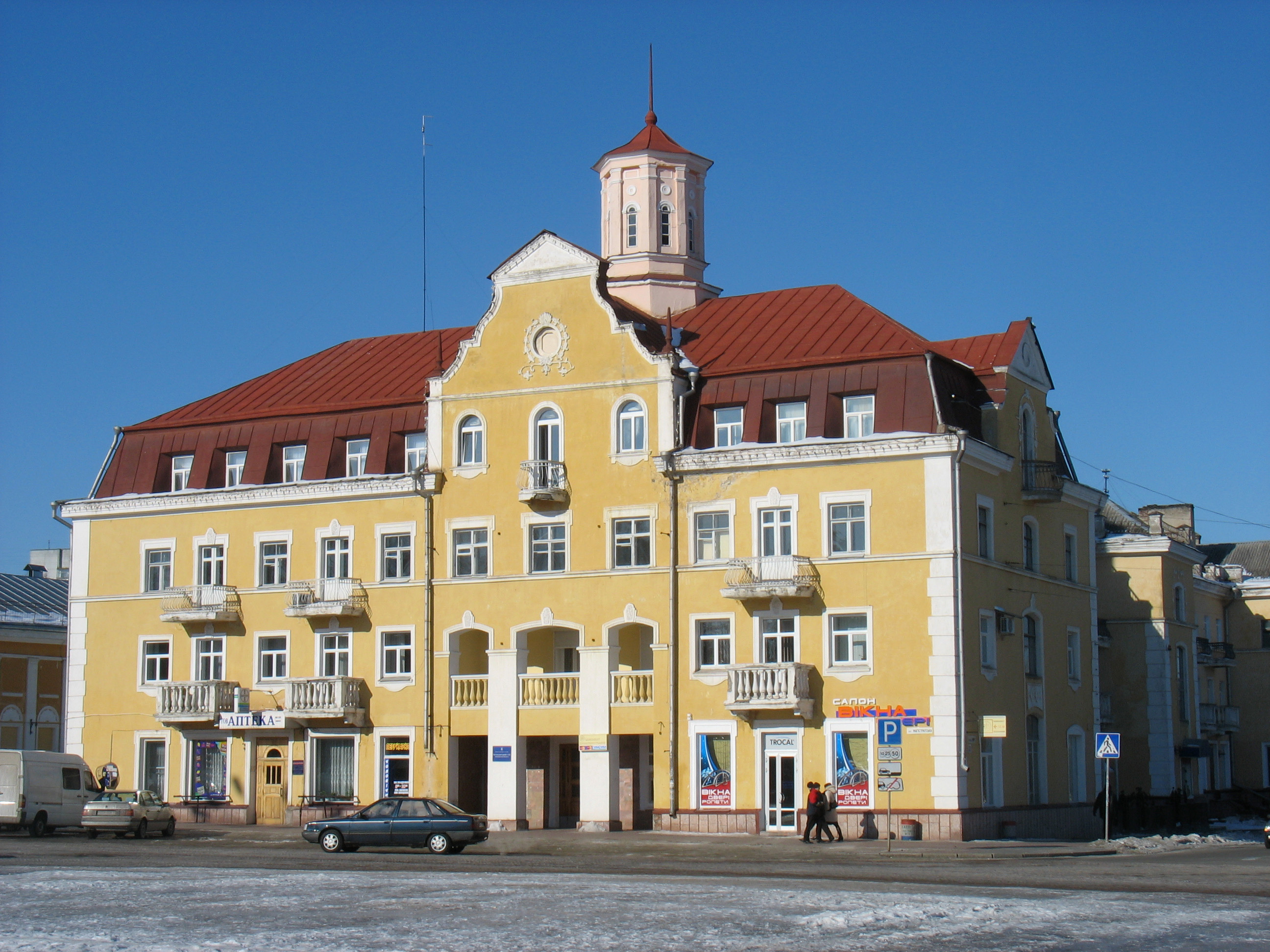
Hotel Desna

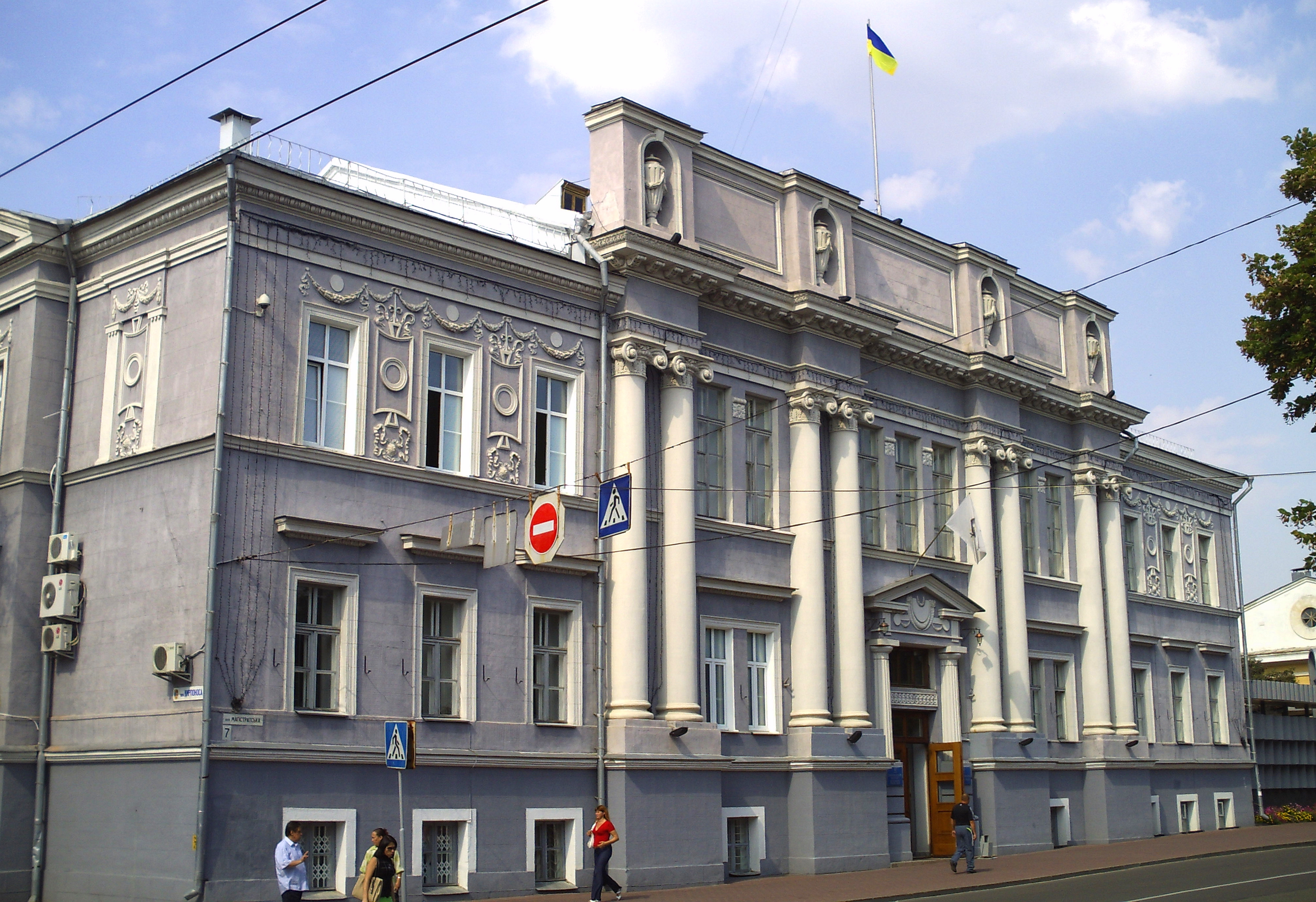
Chernihiv City Council

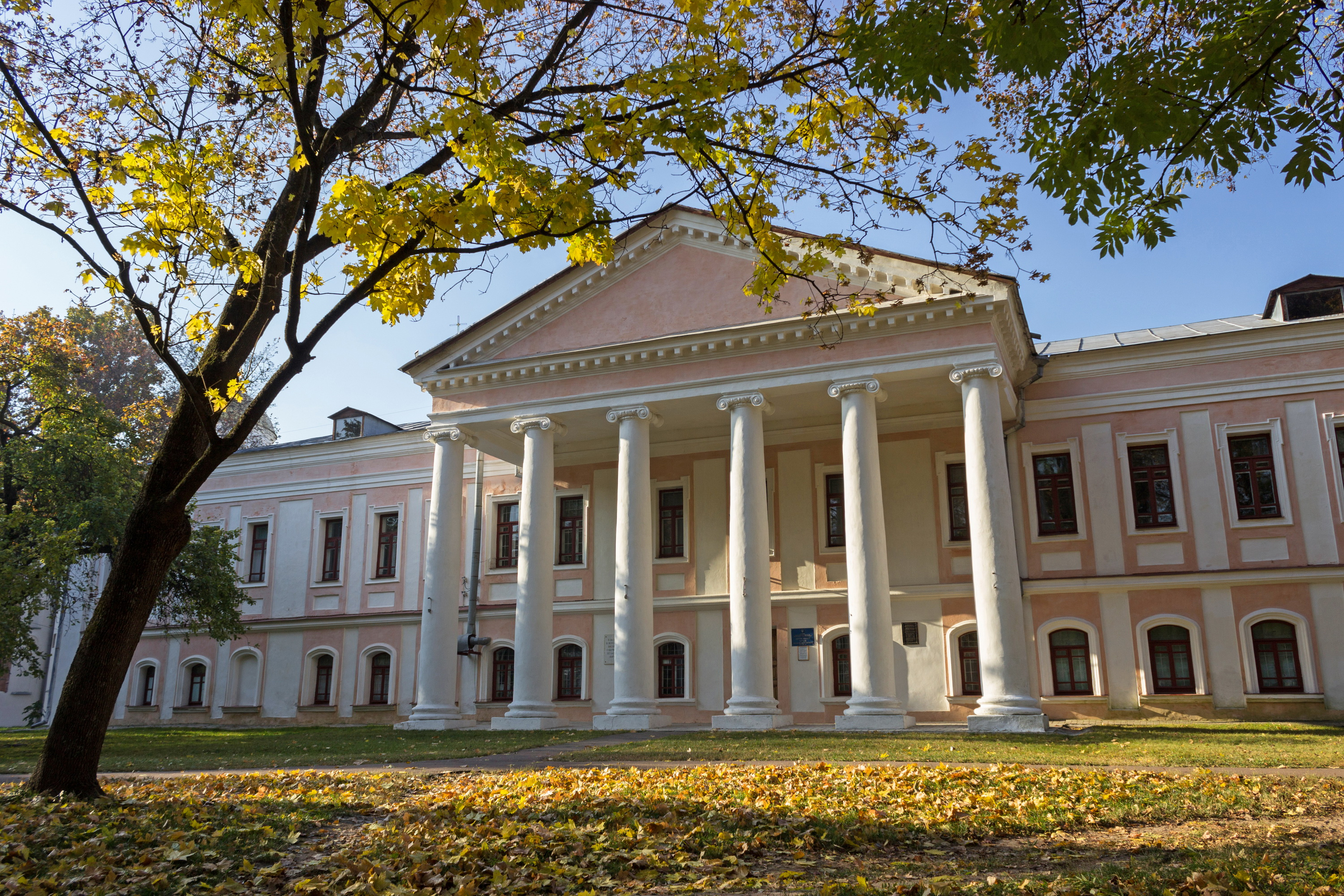
Archbishop's residence

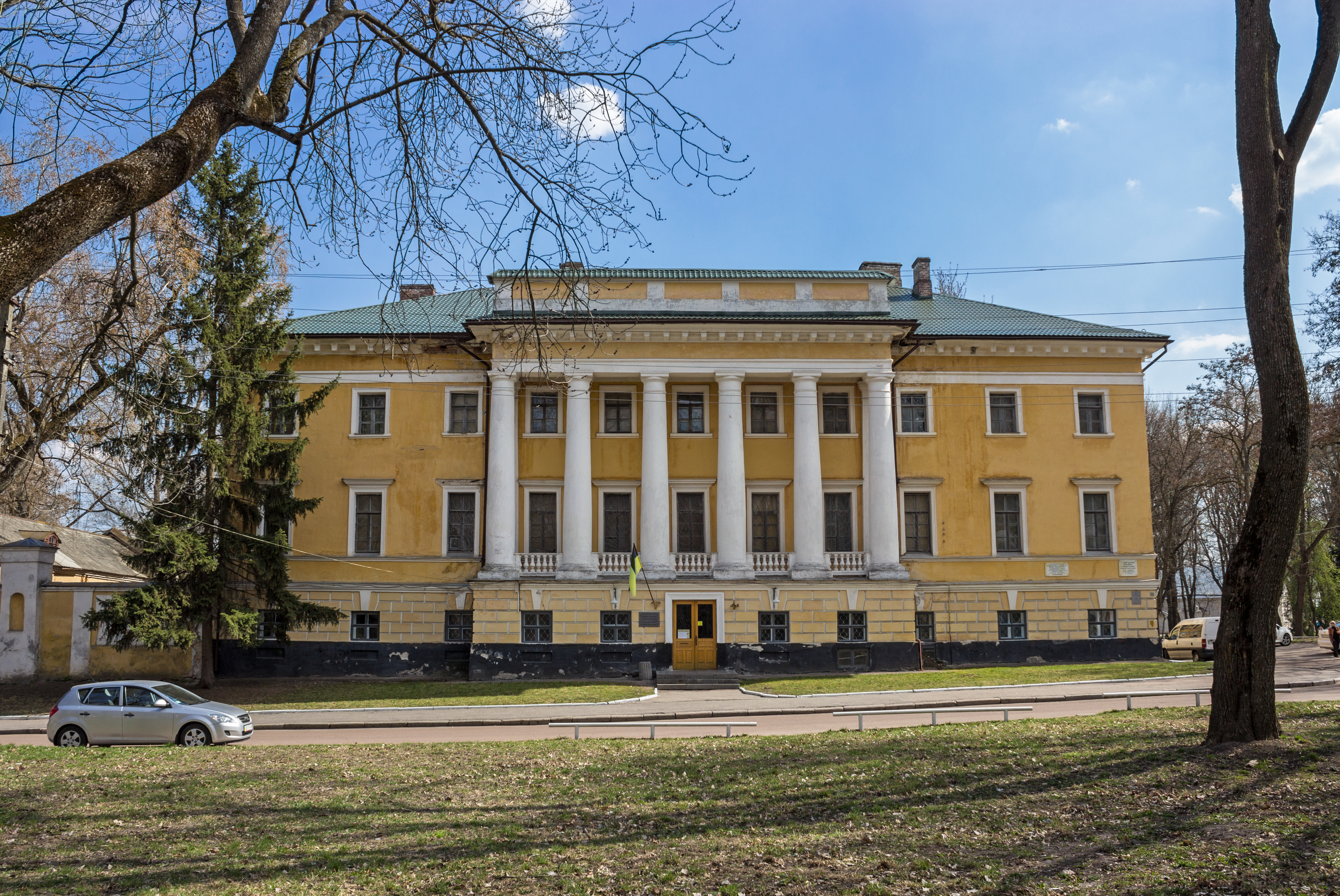
Chernihiv Regional Art Museum

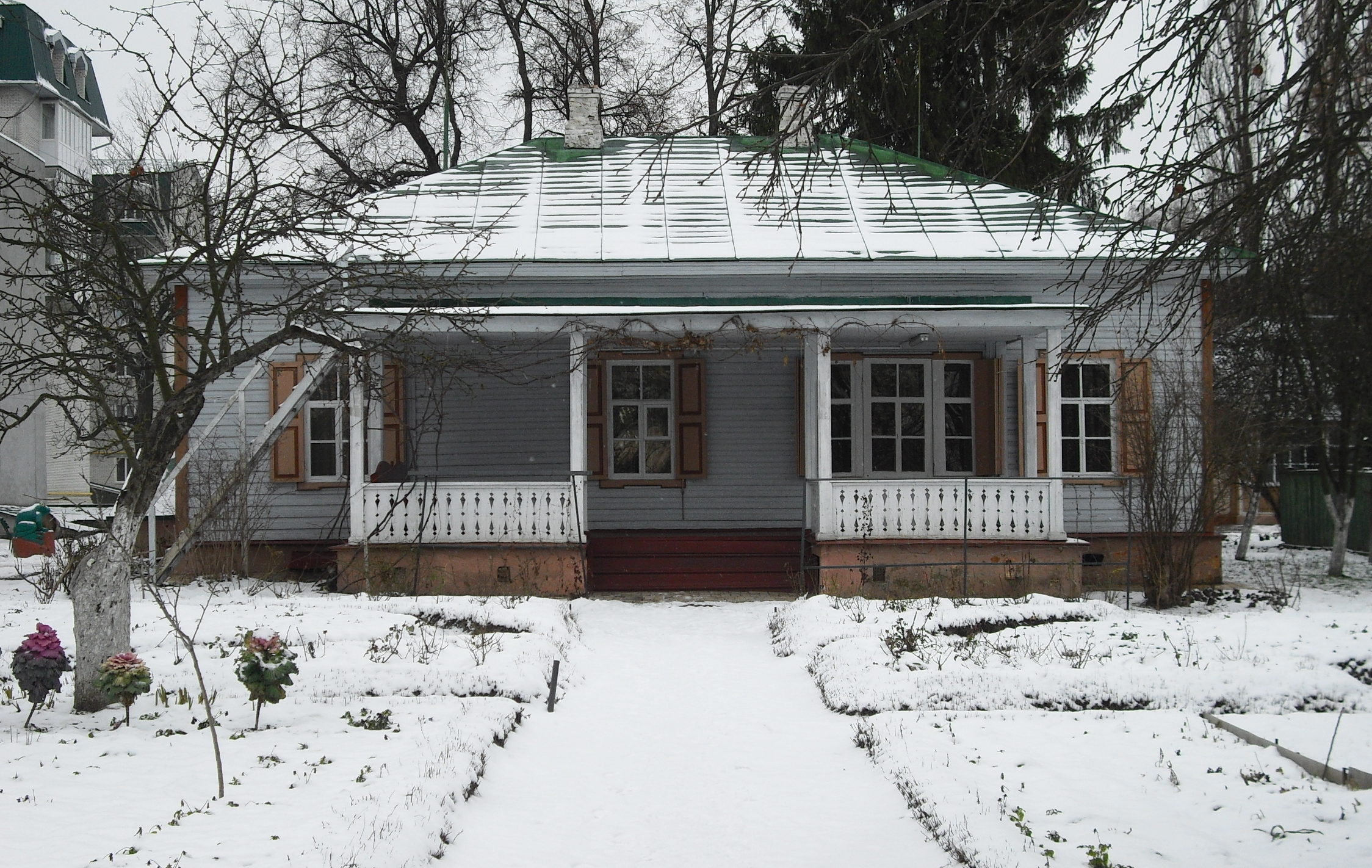
Mykhailo Kotsiubynskyi Museum

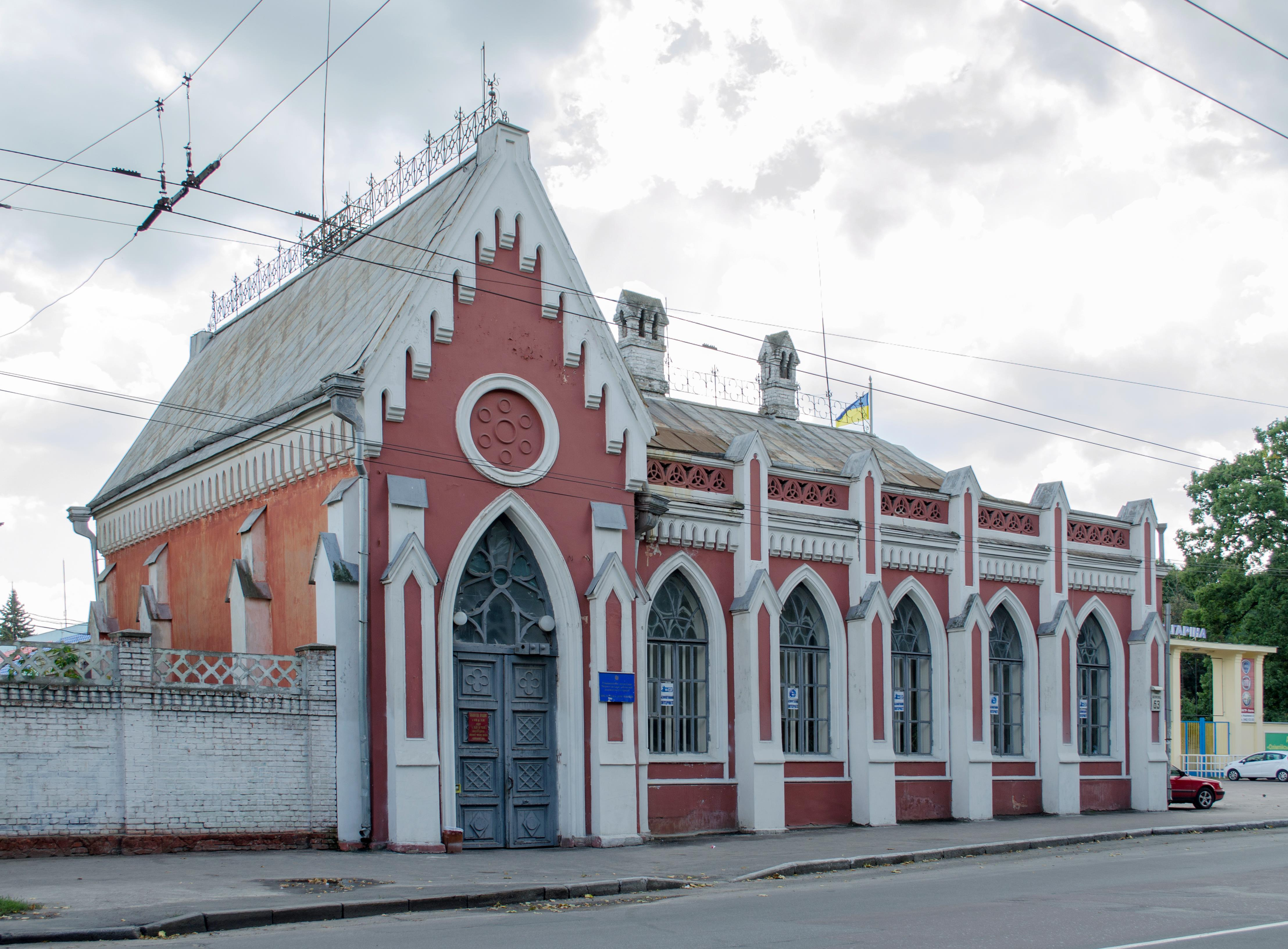
House of Tarnovsky, now Museum of Antiquities

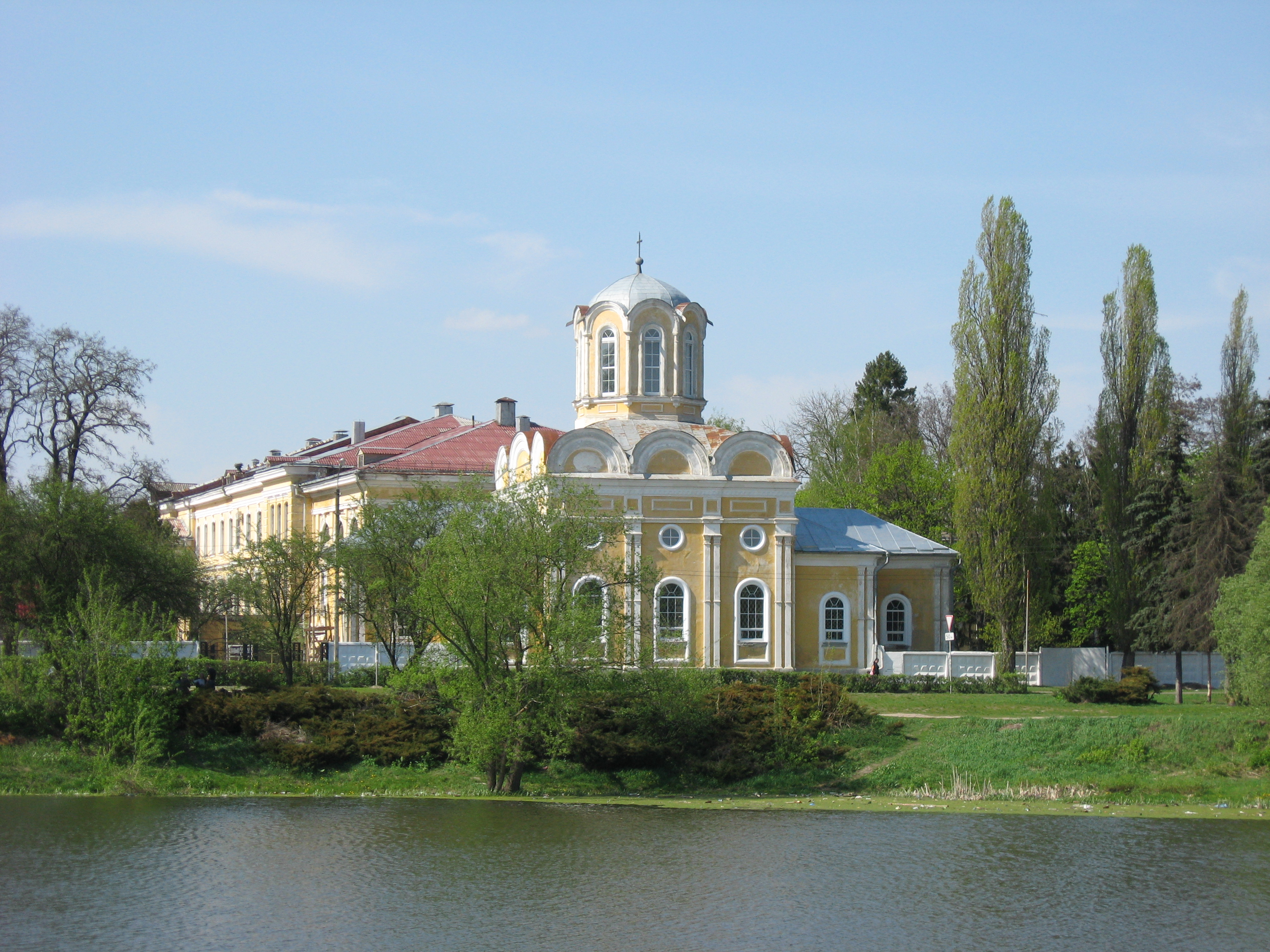
Church of Saint Michael and Saint Fedor in Chernihiv

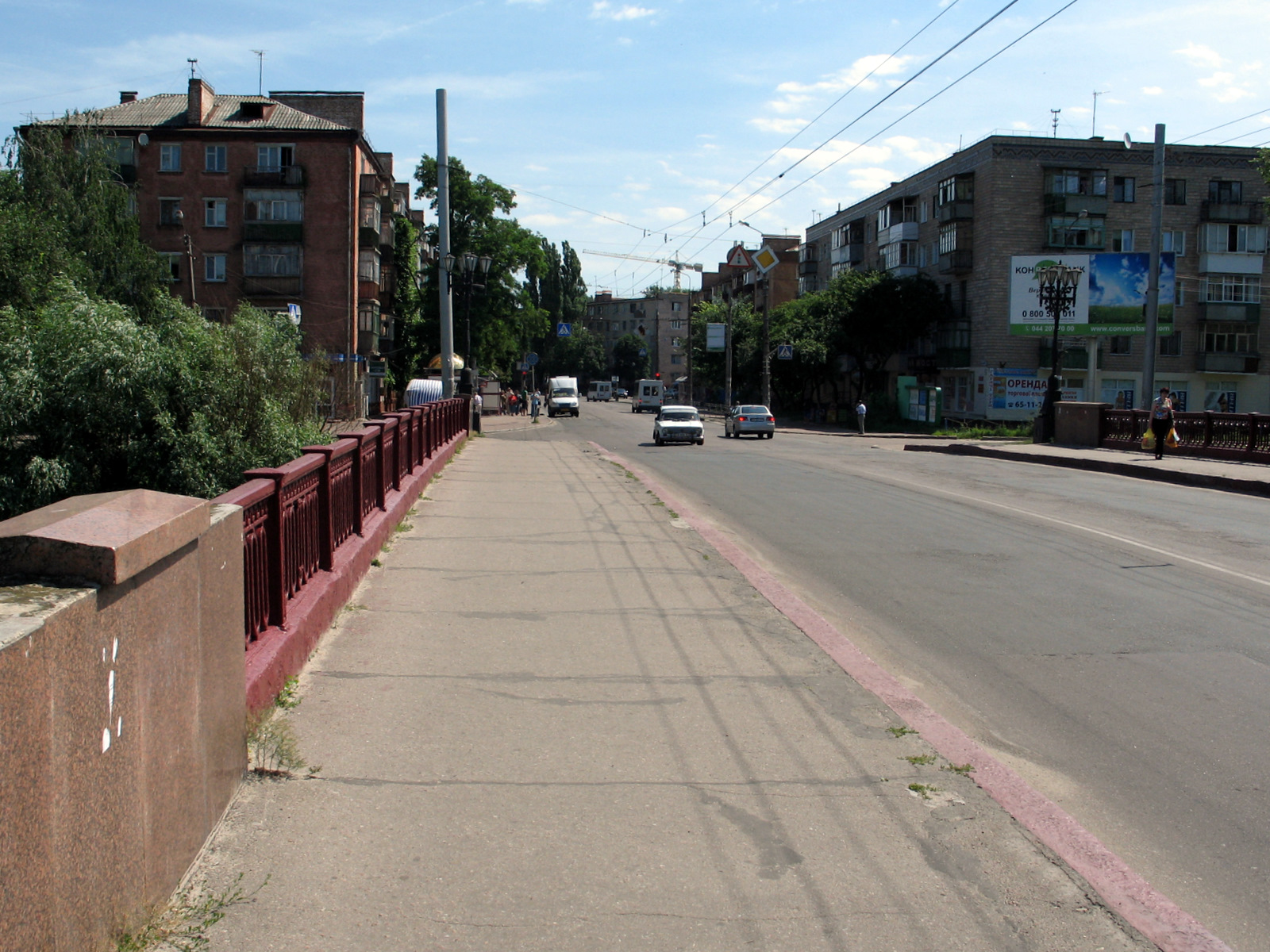
Red Bridge

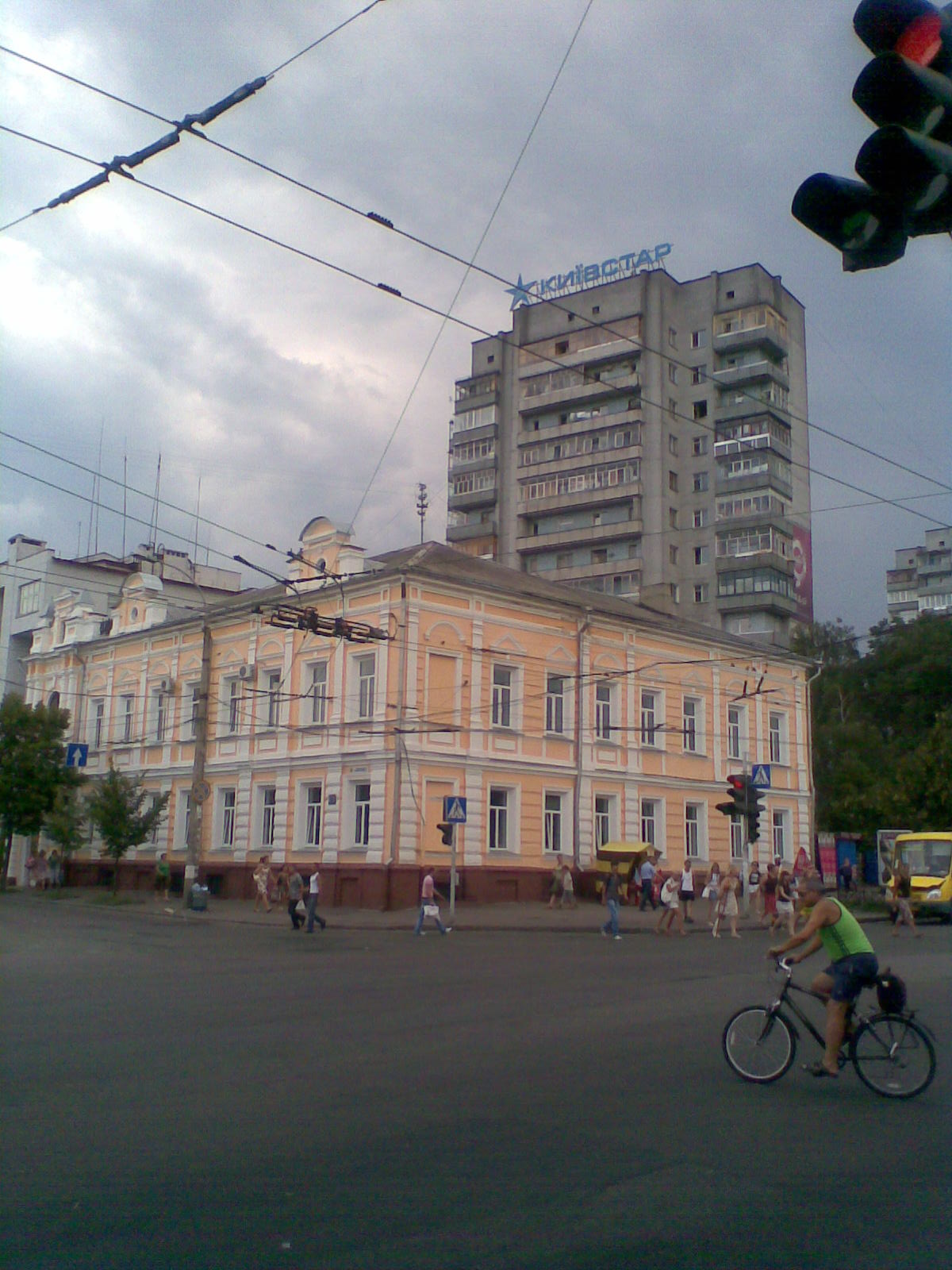
Old and modern buildings

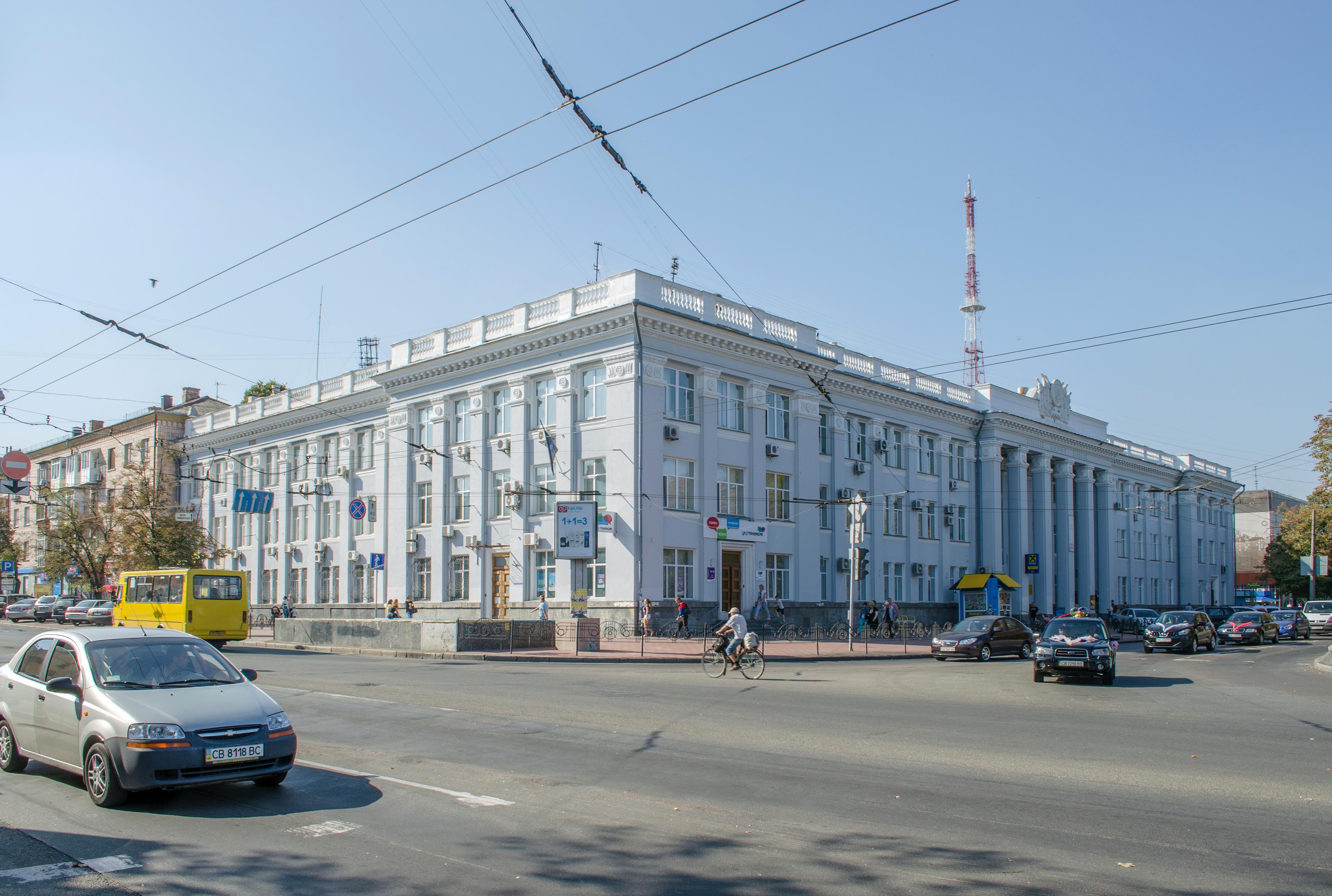
Central Post Office

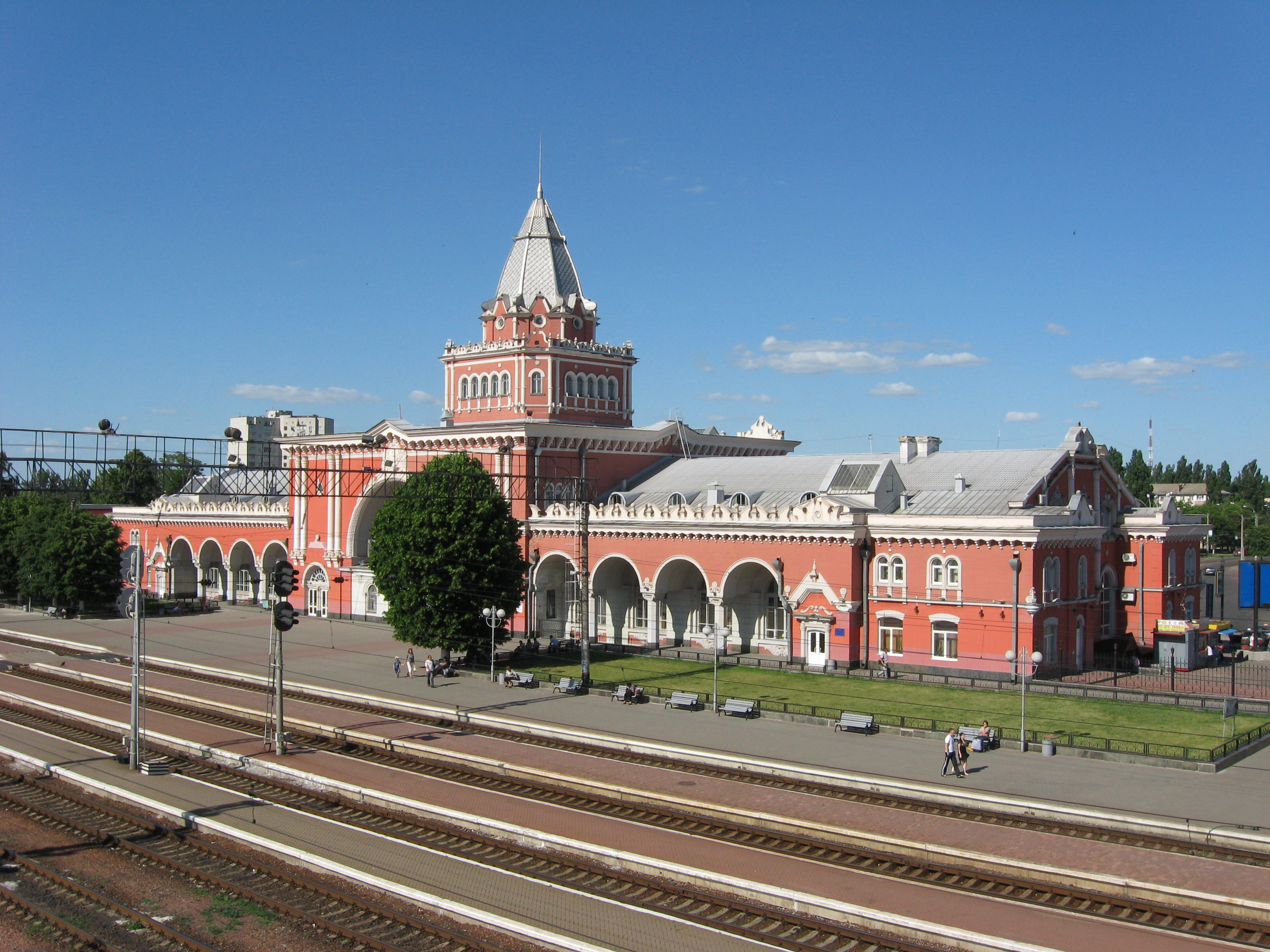
Chernihiv Ovruch railway

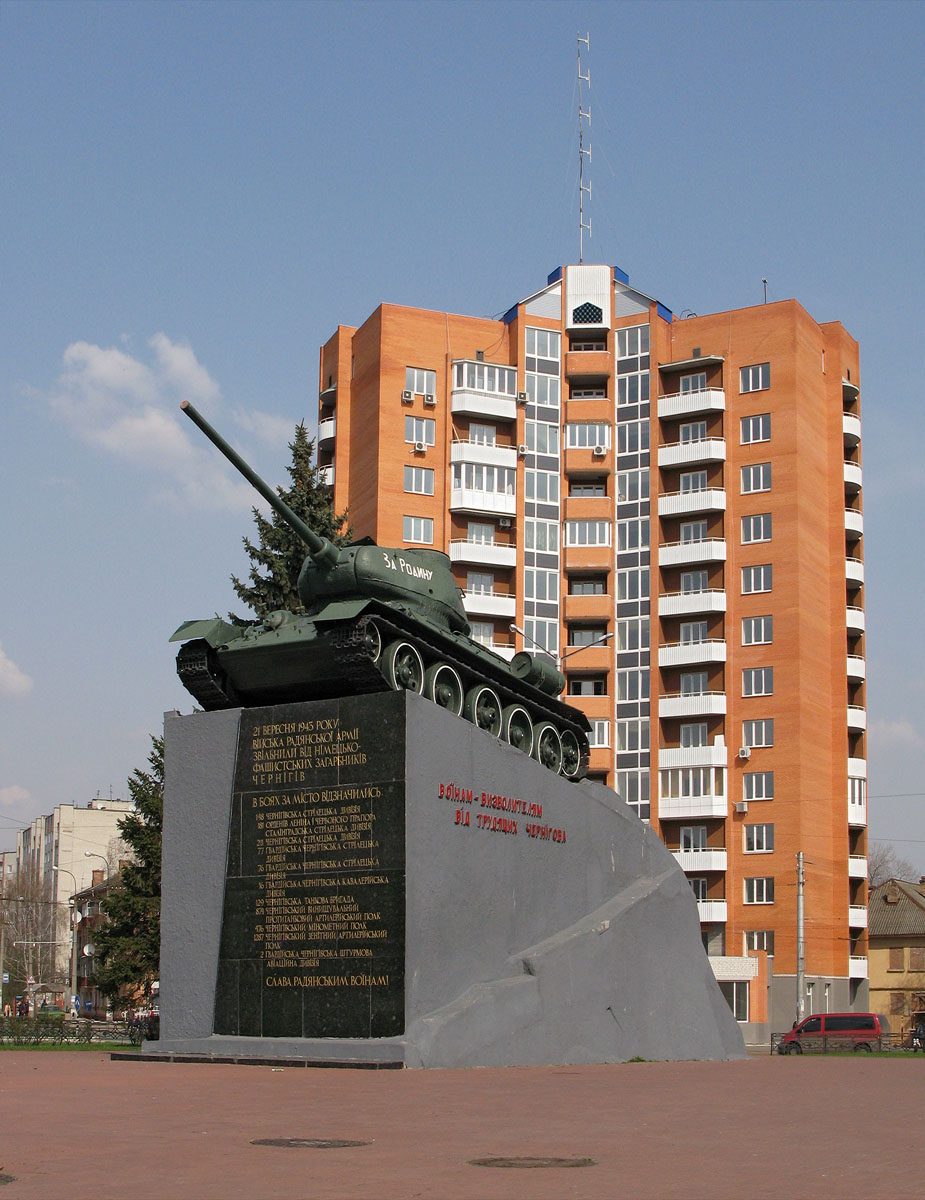
Monument to Soldiers Liberators

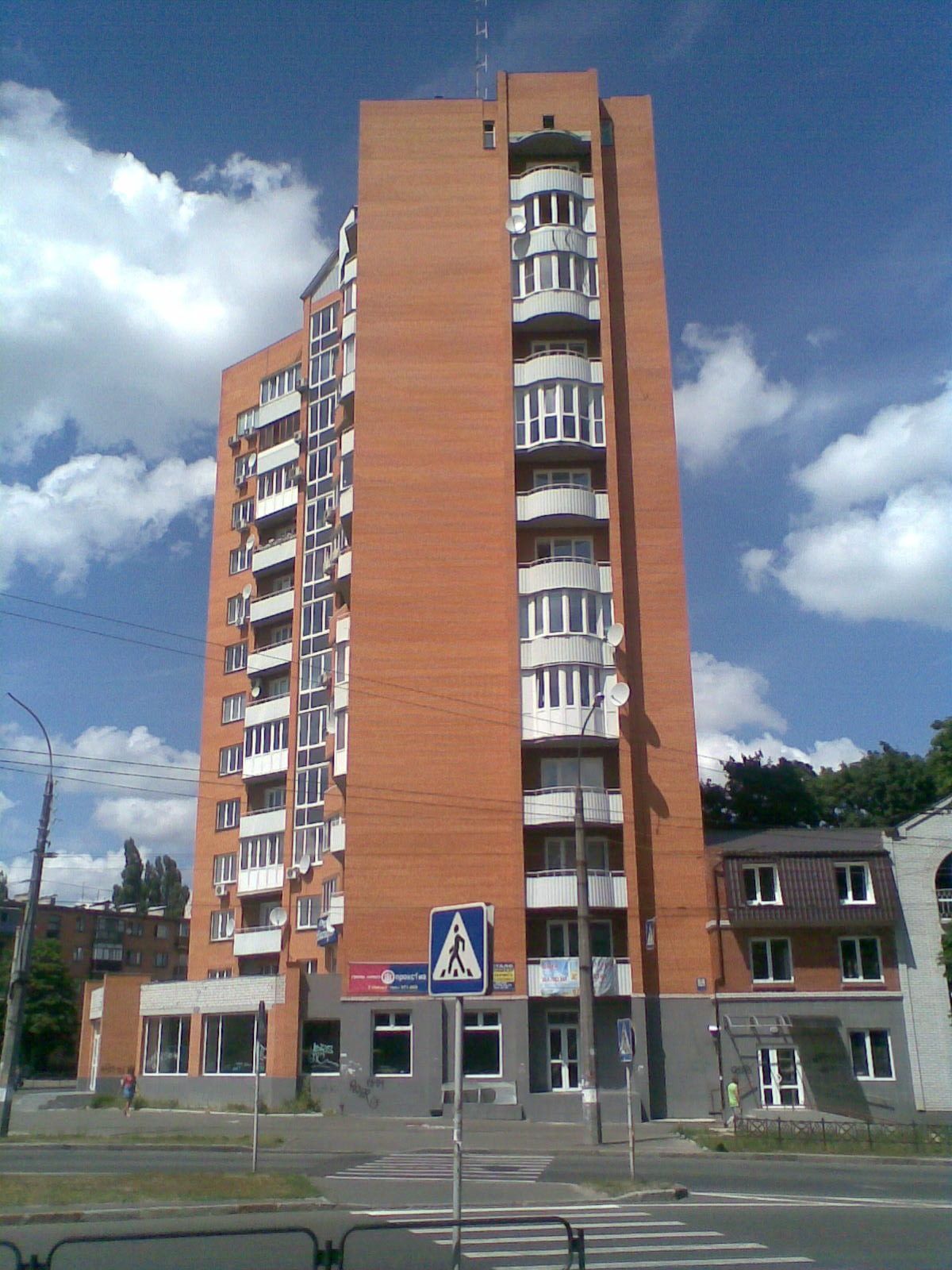
New apartment block

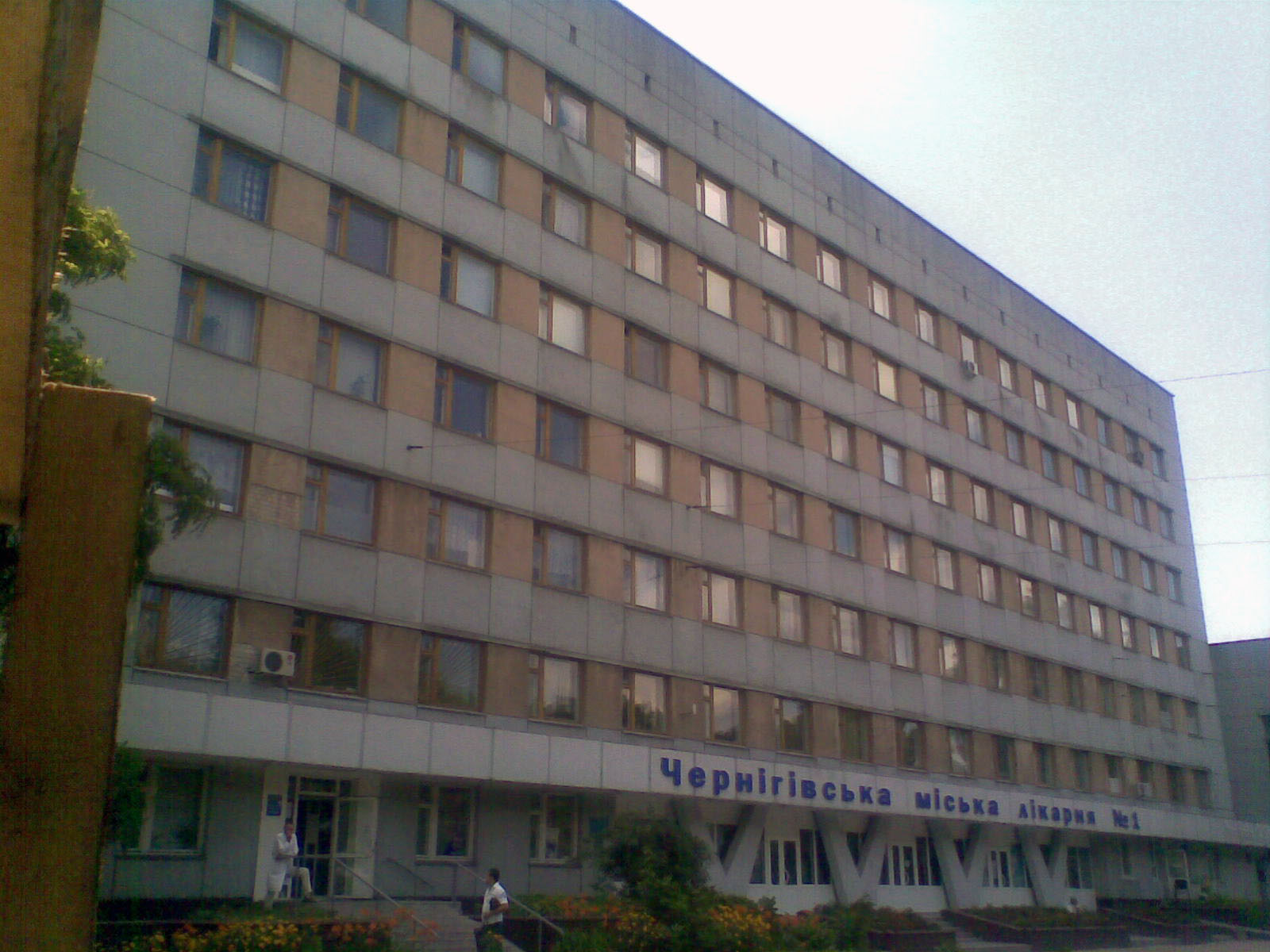
City hospital

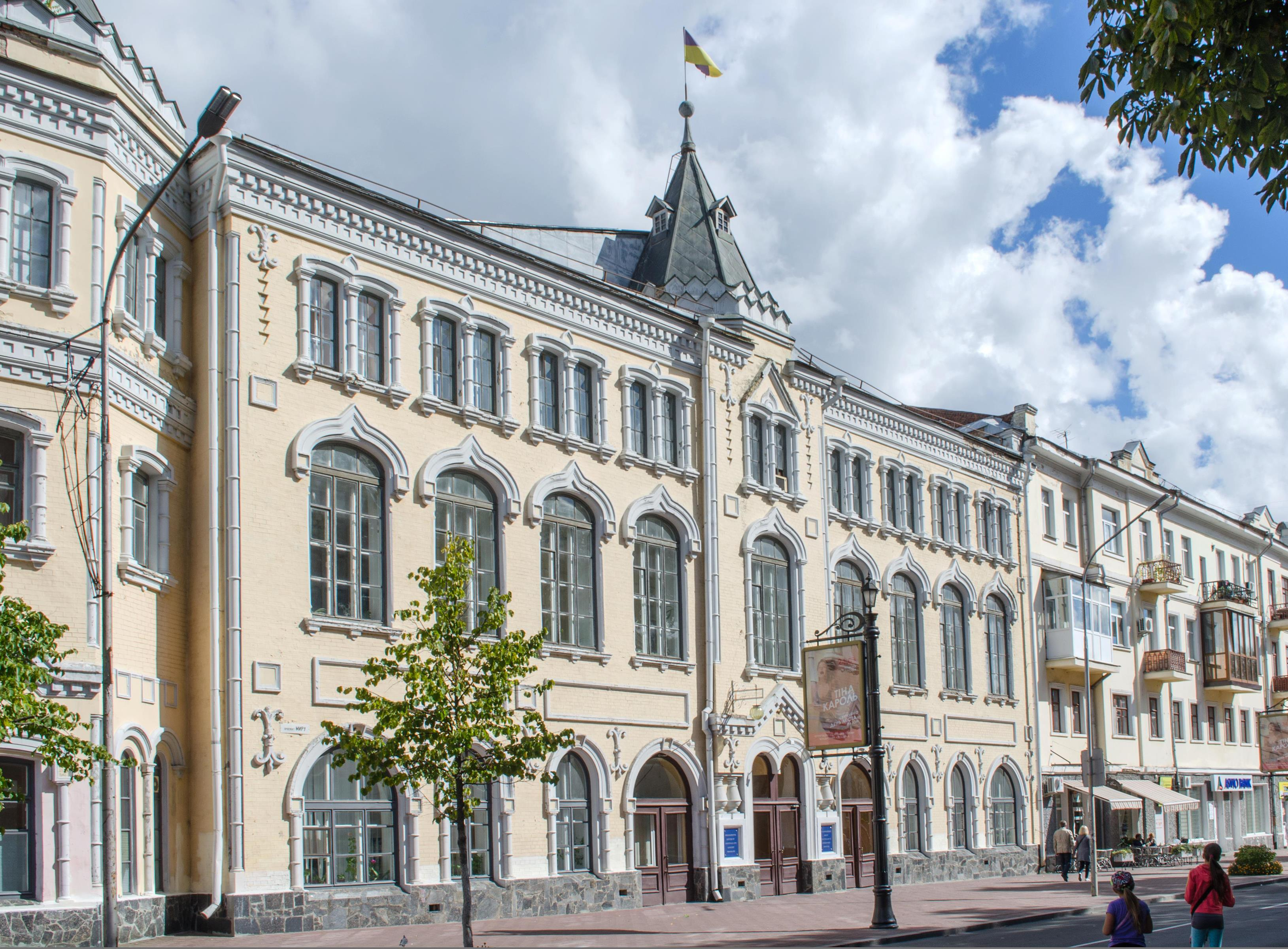
Chernihiv philharmony

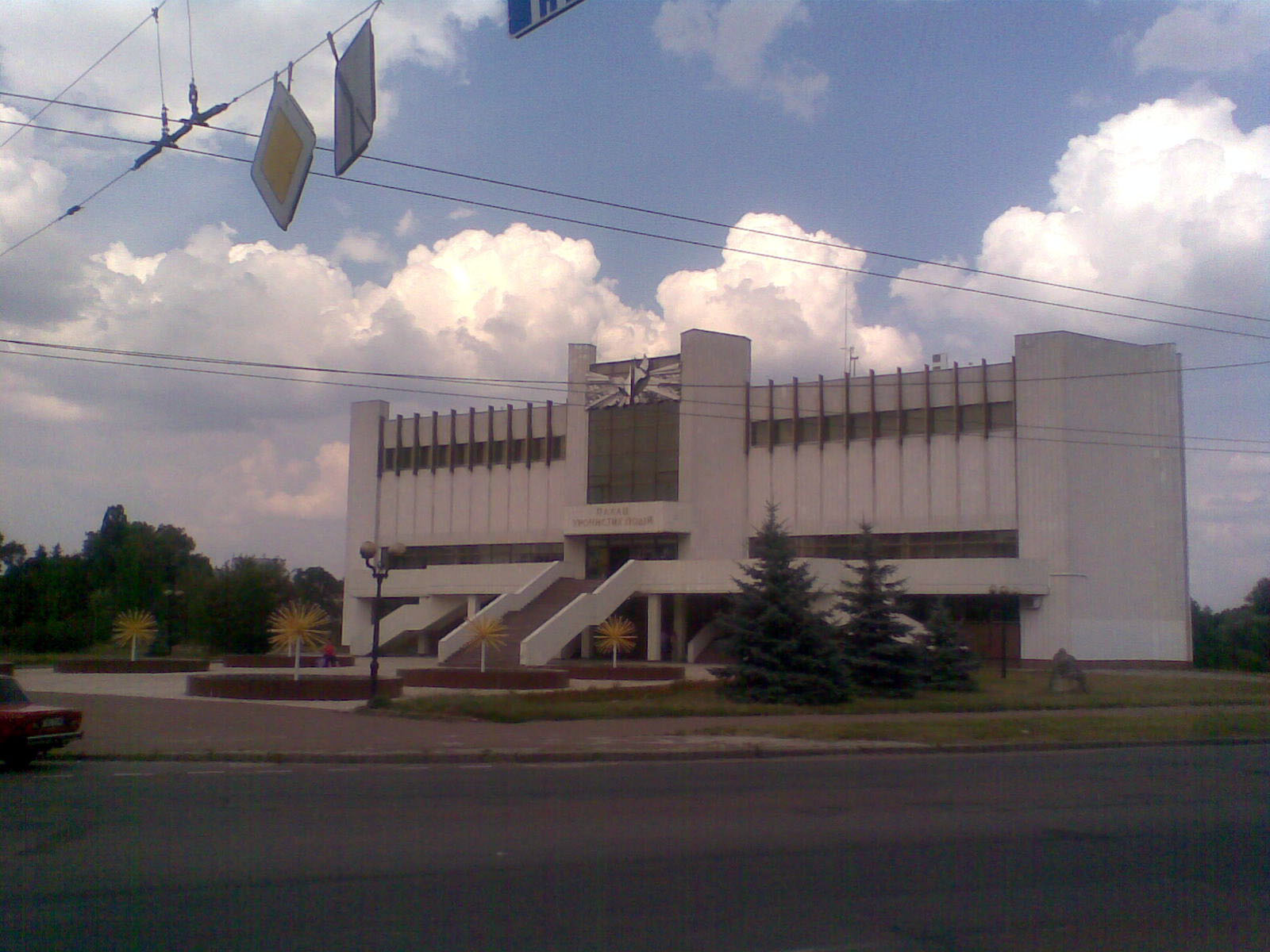
Wedding Palace

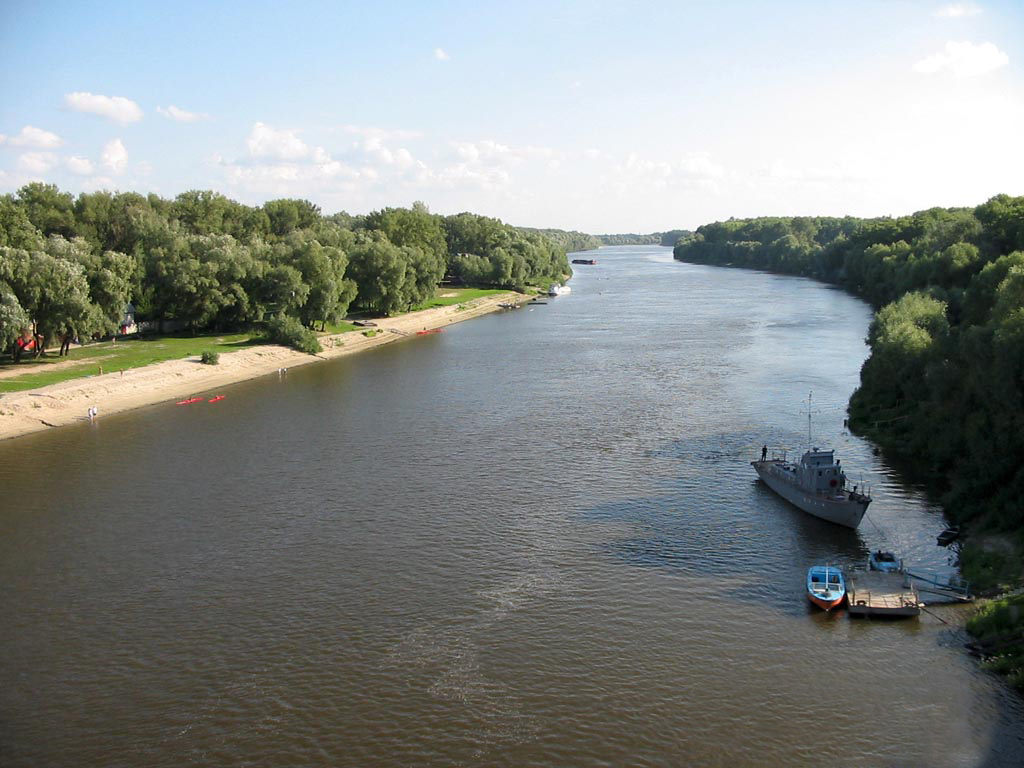
Desna River

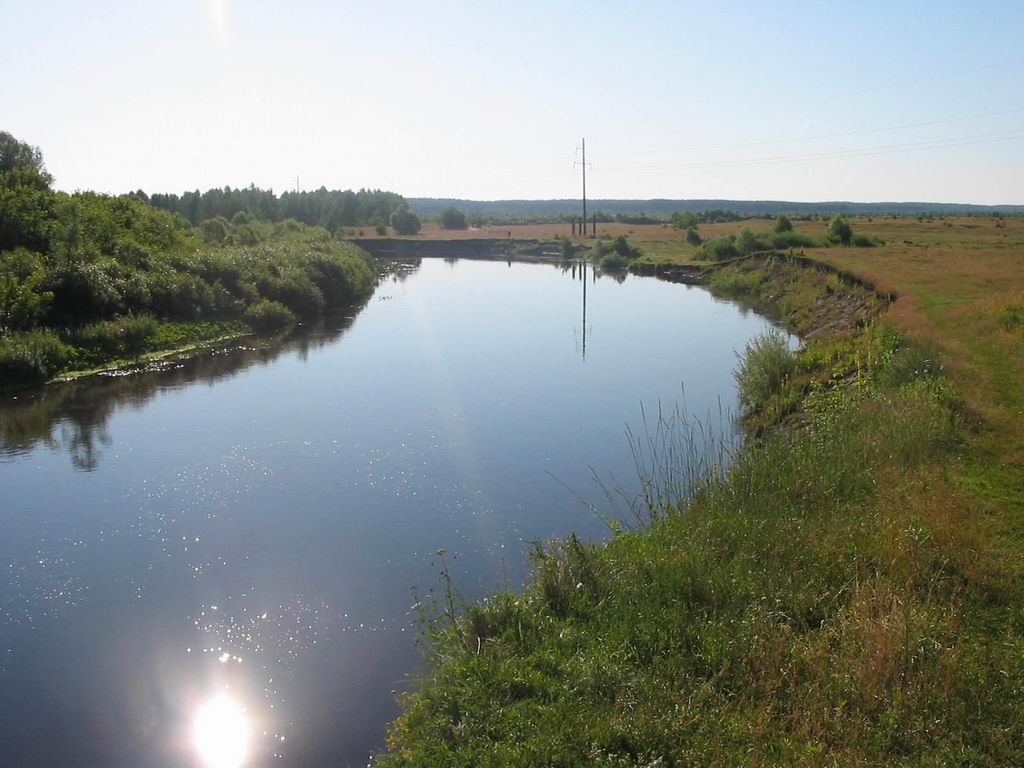
Snov River

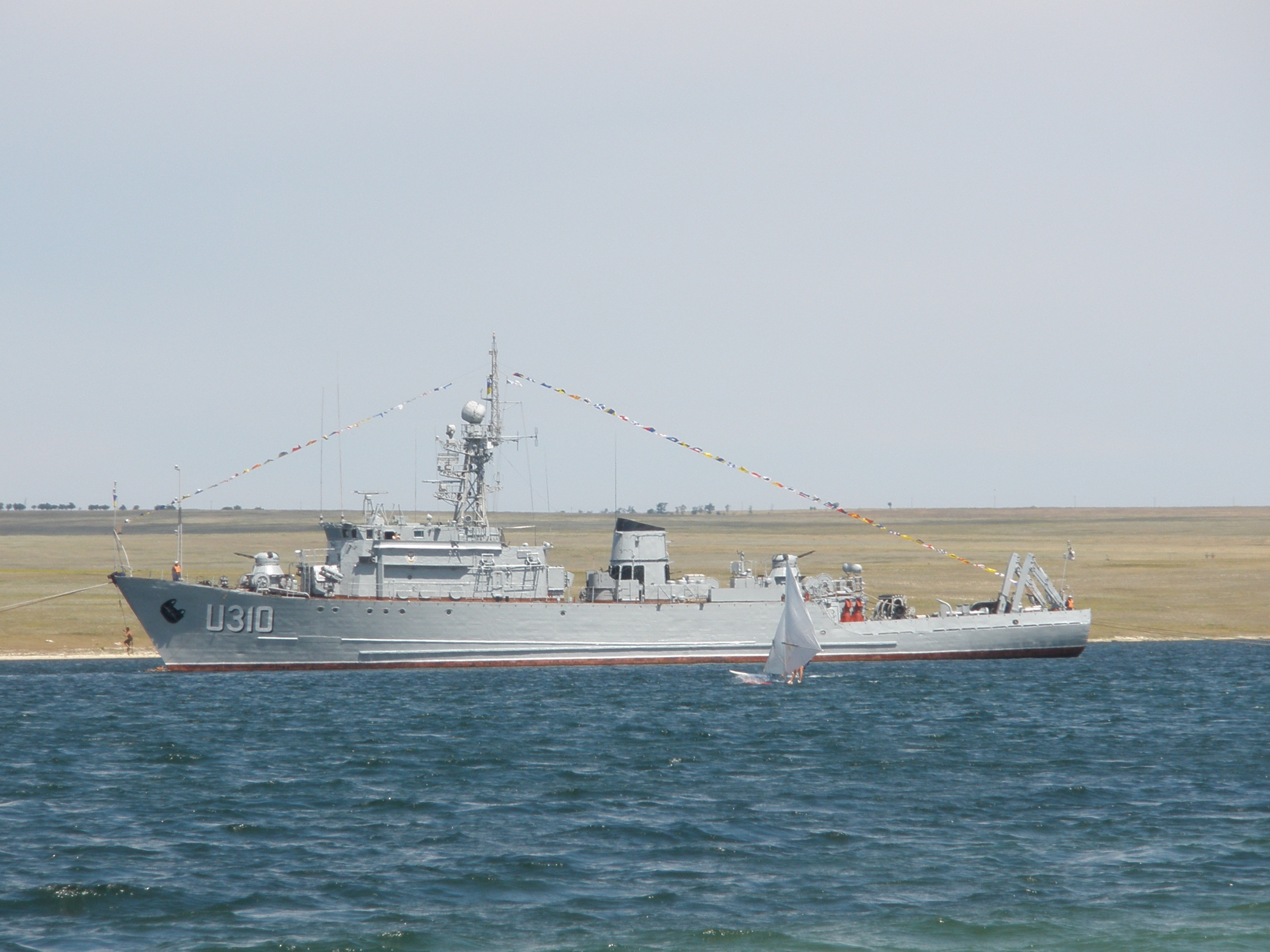
Chernihiv (U310)

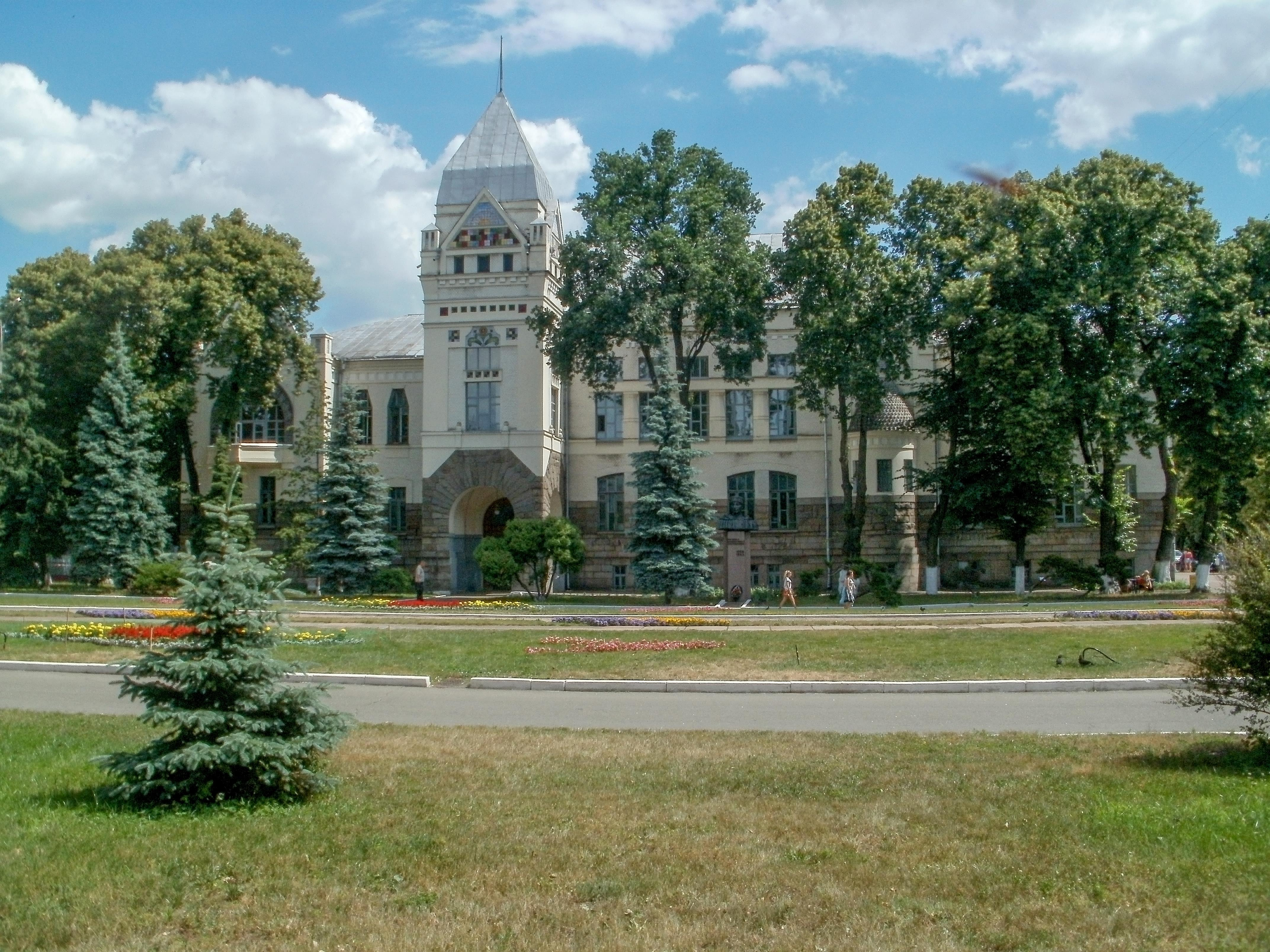
Korolenko Chernihiv Regional Universal Scientific Library
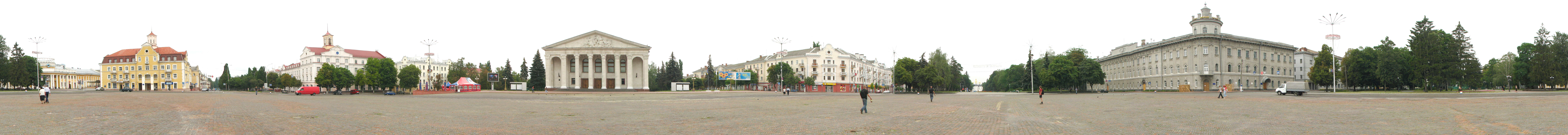
A panoramic view of the Krasna Square
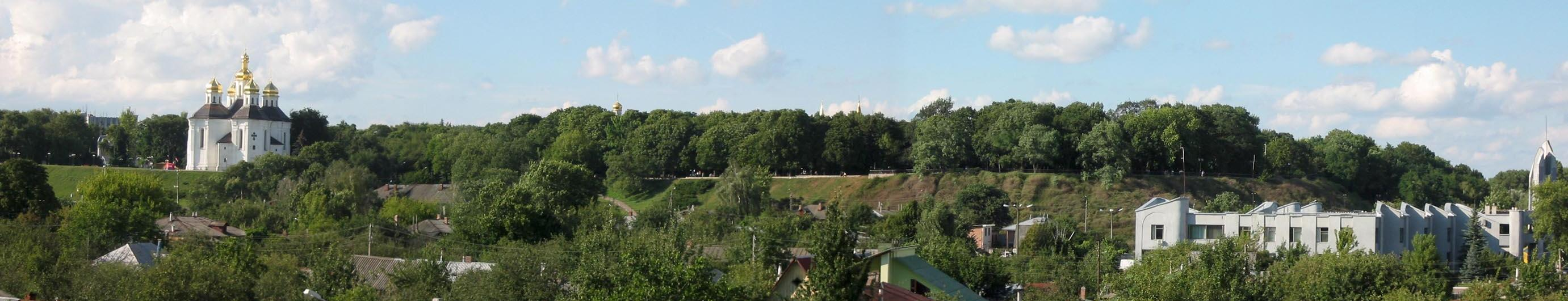
A Chernihiv panorama from Desna River to Catherine's Church

== Notable people ==
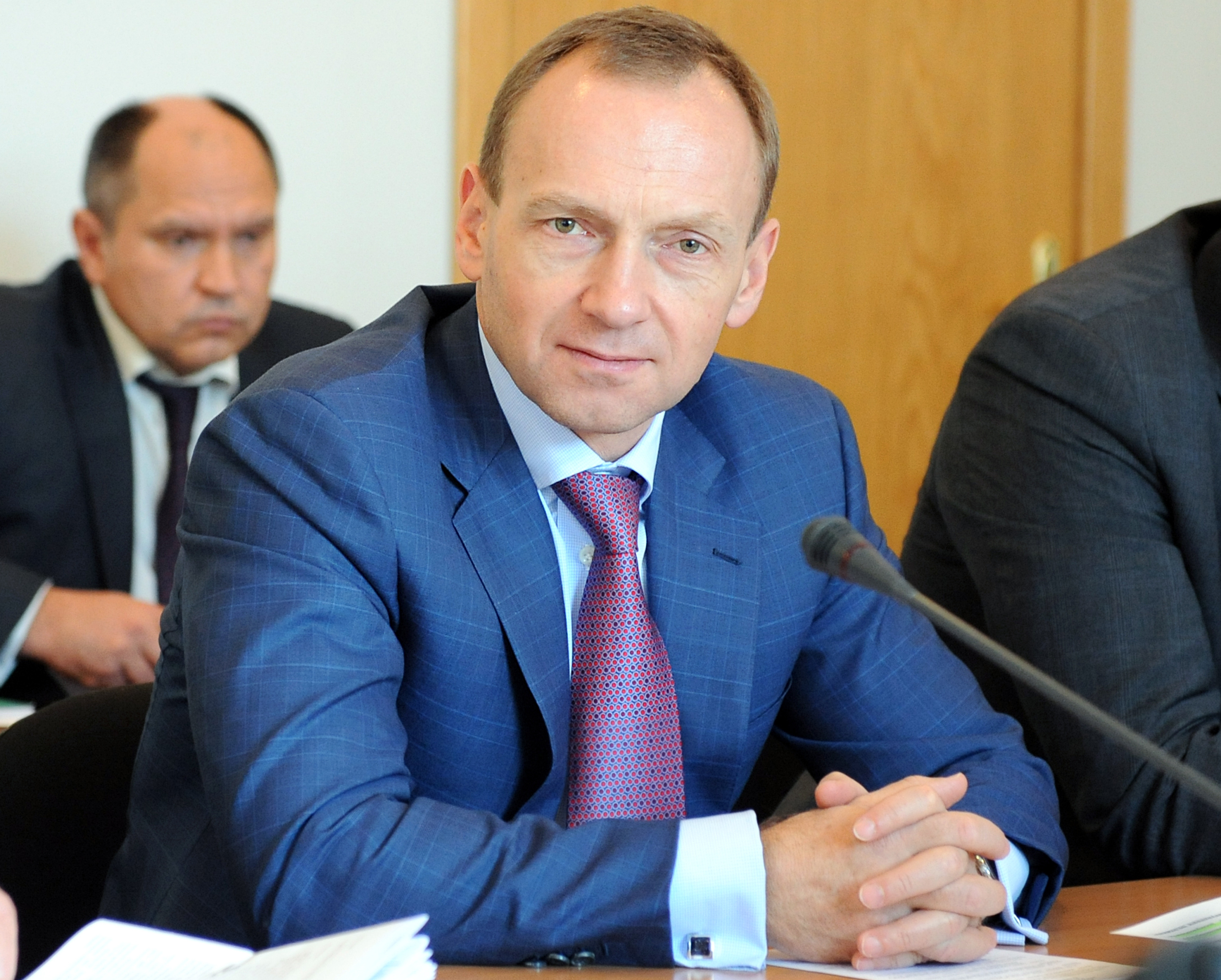
Vladyslav Atroshenko, 2013

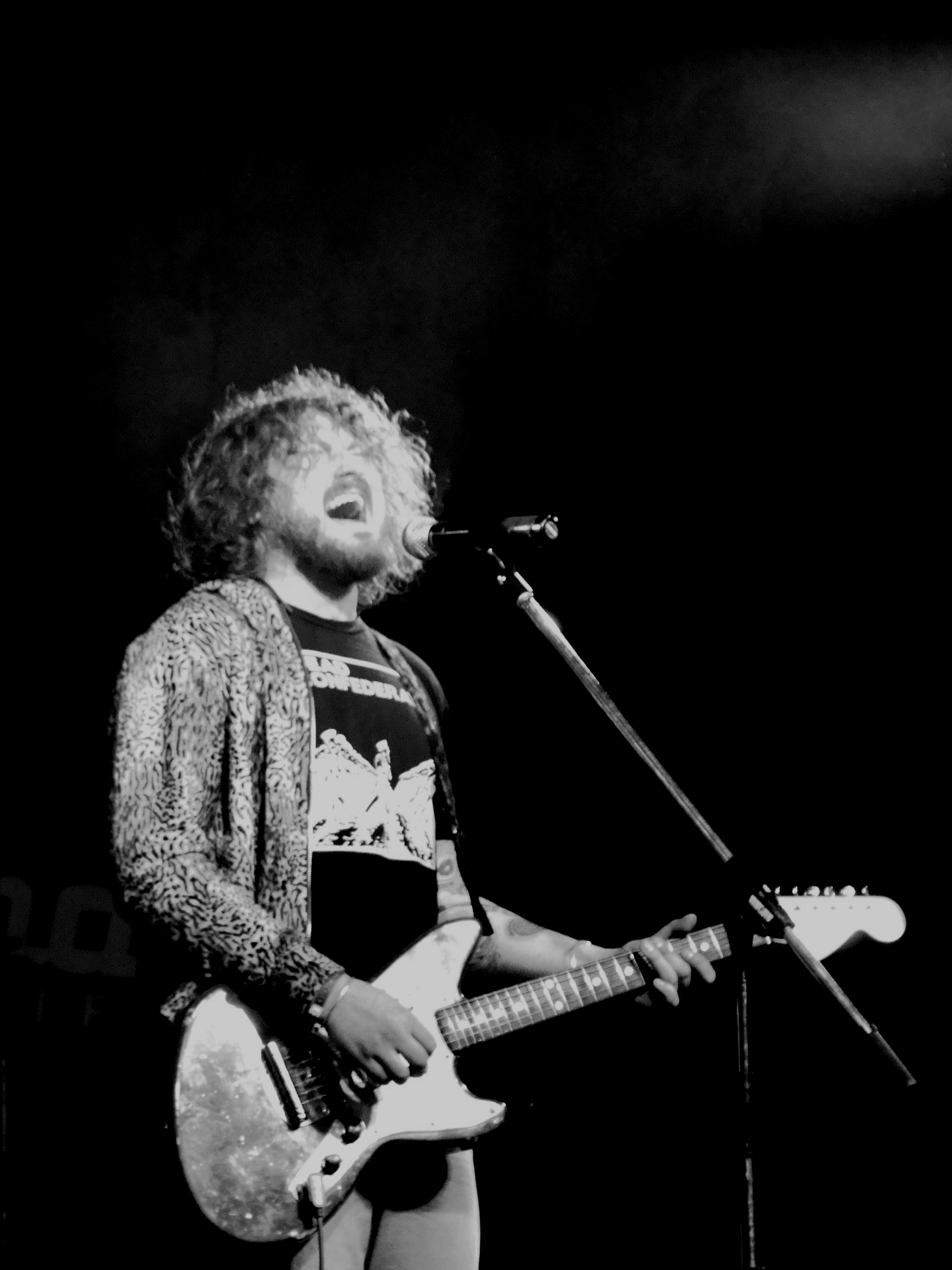
Oleksandr Chemerov, 2012

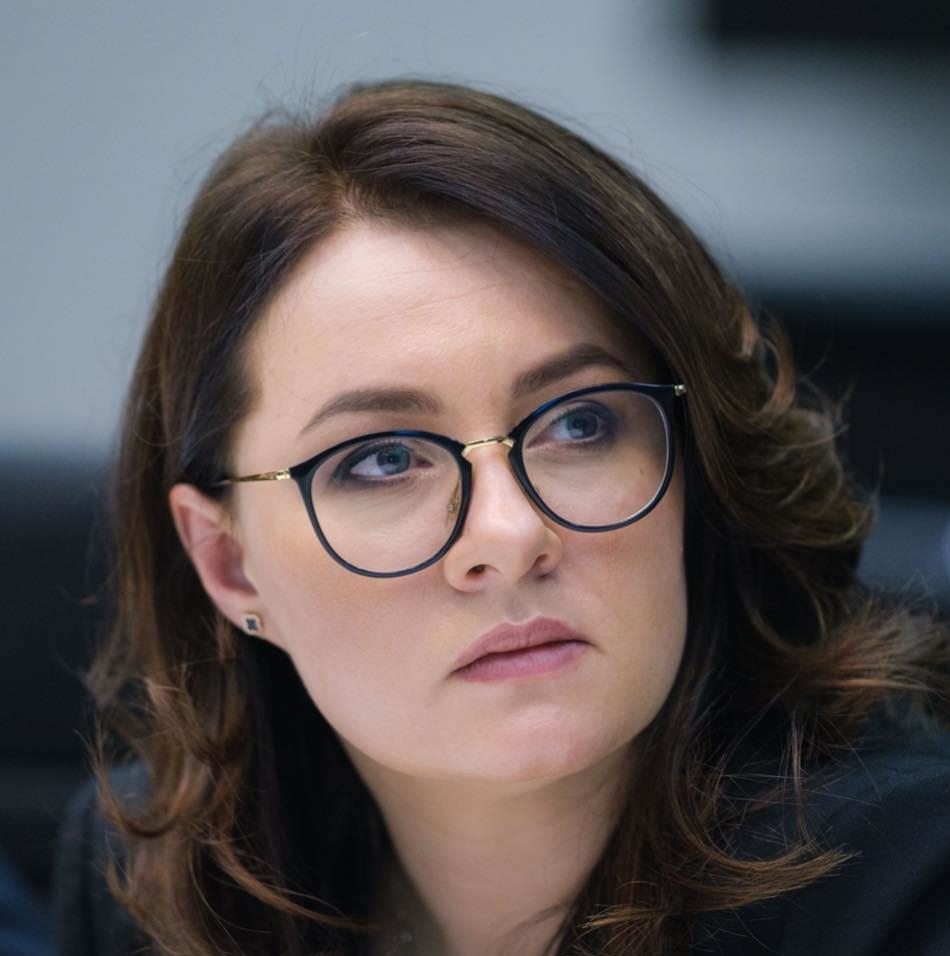
Yulia Svyrydenko, 2021

- Lyubov Andreyeva-Delmas (1884–1969), opera singer
- Vladimir Antonov-Ovseenko (1883–1938), Soviet Bolshevik leader and diplomat
- Vladyslav Atroshenko (born 1968) a Ukrainian politician and mayor of Chernihiv.
- Angelica Balabanoff (1878–1965) a Jewish Russian-Italian social democratic activist.
- Xenia Belmas (1890–1981) a Ukrainian soprano, doyenne of the Paris Opera
- Oleksandr Chemerov (born 1981) rock musician and frontman of rock band Dymna Sumish
- Stepan Davydov (1777–1825) an Imperial Russian composer and singer.
- Olga Della-Vos-Kardovskaya (1875–1952) a Russian painter and graphic artist.
- Nikolai Fedorovich Drozdov (1862–1953), scientist and Red Army general
- Alter Esselin (1889–1974) a Jewish-American poet who wrote in the Yiddish language.
- Haim Gamzu (1910–1982) an Israeli art and drama critic.
- Mordechai Hershman (1888–1940) an American Jewish cantor ("chazzan") and singer.
- Isaac of Chernigov (12th C.) a Jewish scholar on questions of Biblical exegesis
- Giennadij Jerszow (born 1967), Polish and Ukrainian sculptor and jewellery designer
- Yehuda L. Katzenelson (1846–1917) a military doctor, writer and publicist of Hebrew Literature.
- Anna Leporskaya (1900–1982), Soviet avant-garde artist
- Oleh Liashko (born 1972) a Ukrainian politician and journalist, leader of the Radical Party.
- Mykola Marchenko (born 1943) sculptor
- Anna Maximovitch (1901–1943) a Russian aristocrat and neuropsychiatrist
- Basile Maximovitch (1902–1944) Russian aristocrat, mining engineer and Soviet agent
- Zelda Mishkovsky (1914–1984), known as Zelda, an Israeli poet.
- Solomon Nikritin (1898–1965) a painter, avant-garde artist, philosopher and author.
- Alexander Ozersky (1813–1880) a noble Russian military geologist and governor of Tomsk.
- Anatoly Rybakov (1911–1998) Soviet and Ukrainian writer of novels and children books
- Valeria Shashenok (born 2001), Ukrainian photographer and 2022 war refugee
- Sviatoslav III of Kiev (1126–1194) ruled Kiev alongside Rurik Rostislavich
- Yulia Svyrydenko (born 1985) former Prime Minister of Ukraine
- Jacob Tamarkin (1888–1945), Russian-American mathematician
- Dora Wasserman (1919–2003) a Jewish-Canadian actress, playwright and theatre director.

=== Sport ===
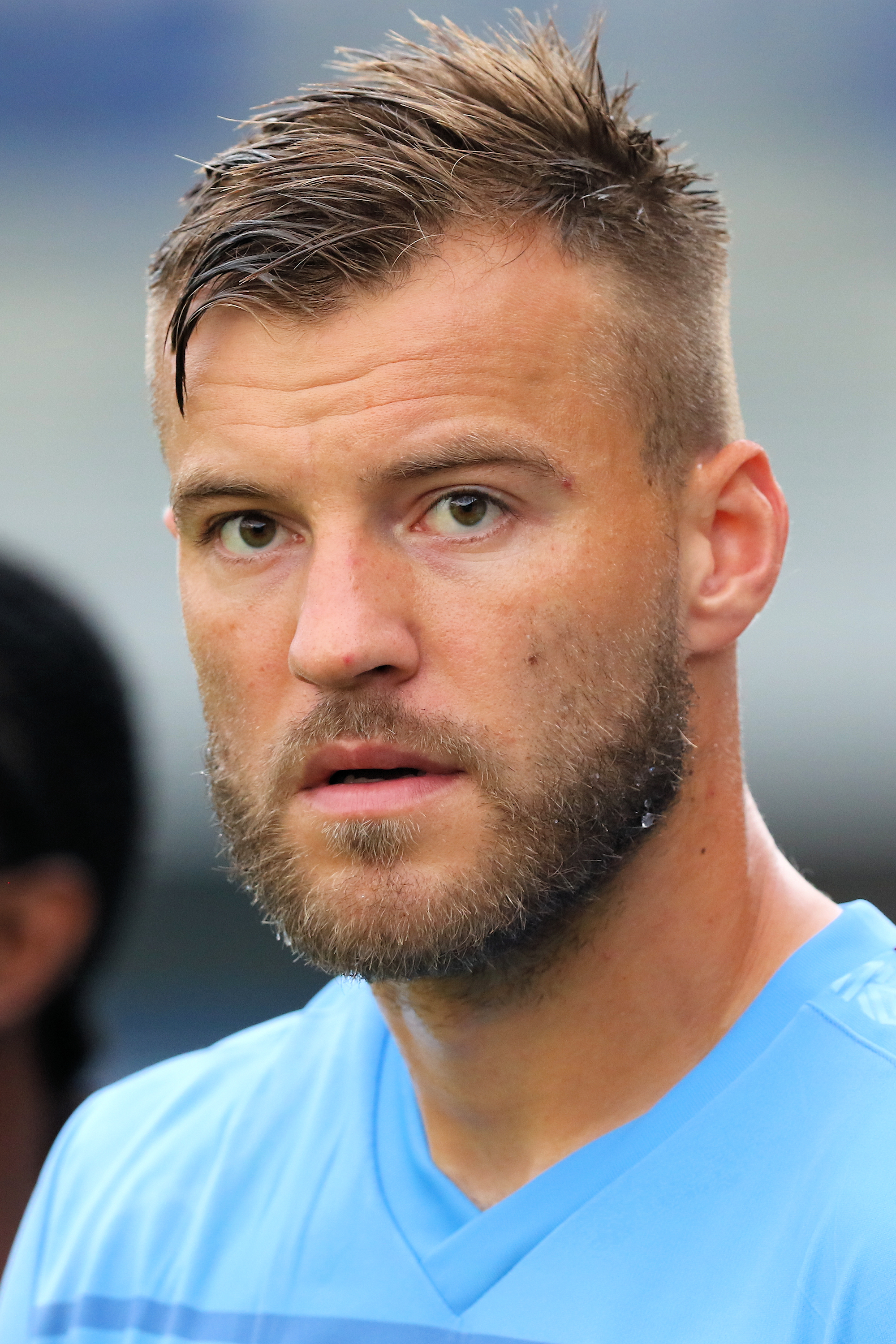
Andriy Yarmolenko, 2019

- Oleksandr Batyuk (born 1960) cross-country skier, team silver medallist at the 1984 Winter Olympics
- Denys Bezborodko (born 1994), Ukrainian footballer with 200 club caps
- Yana Doroshenko (born 1994), Ukrainian-born Azerbaijani volleyball player
- Vitaliy Havrysh (born 1986) retired Ukrainian footballer with 400 club caps
- Yuriy Hruznov (born 1947), goalkeeper and coach, 116 club caps with FC Desna Chernihiv
- Tatiana Kostiuk (born 1982) French chess player and Woman chess Grandmaster.
- Alexander Kovchan (born 1983) a Ukrainian chess Grandmaster
- Tatiana Melamed (born 1974) German Woman chess grandmaster
- Dmytro Mytrofanov (born 1989) a Ukrainian middleweight professional boxer
- Andriy Protsko (born 1947), Ukrainian footballer, over 300 club caps for FC Desna Chernihiv
- Vladimir Savon (1940–2005) a Ukrainian chess player and Grandmaster.
- Yukhym Shkolnykov (1939–2009) Ukrainian coach and Soviet footballer.
- Eduard Weitz (born 1946), Israeli Olympic weightlifter
- Andriy Yarmolenko (born 1989), Ukrainian footballer with 398 club caps and 152 for Ukraine plays for FC Dynamo Kyiv

== Twin towns – sister cities ==
Chernihiv is twinned with:

- Gabrovo, Bulgaria
- Gomel, Belarus
- Hradec Králové, Czech Republic
- Lappeenranta, Finland
- Memmingen, Germany
- Ogre, Latvia
- Petah Tikva, Israel
- Prilep, North Macedonia
- Rzeszów, Poland
- Tarnobrzeg, Poland

== Sources ==
- Ocherk istorii goroda Chernigova 907–1907 gg. (Chernihiv 1908)
- Hrushevs'kyi, M. (ed). Chernihiv i Pivnichne Livoberezhzhia (Kyiv 1928)
- Martin Dimnik. The Dynasty of Chernigov, 1146–1246.
- Rybakov, B. Drevnosti Chernigova (Moscow 1949)
- Ignatkin, I. Chernigov (Kyiv 1955)
- Iedomakha, I. Chernihiv (Kyiv 1958)
- Logvin, G.N. (Г. Н. Логвин) (1965). Chernigov, Novgorod-Seversky, Glukhov, Putivl (Чернигов, Новгород-Северский, Глухов, Путивль) (in Russian). Moscow.
- Asieiev, Iu. Arkhitektura Kyïvs'koï Rusi (Kyiv 1969)
- Karnabida, A. Chernihiv. Istorychno-arkhitekturnyi narys (Kyiv 1969)
- (1972) Історіа міст і сіл Української CCP – Чернігівська область (History of Towns and Villages of the Ukrainian SSR – Chernihiv Oblast), Kyiv. (in Ukrainian)
- Asieiev, Iu. Dzherela. Mystetstvo Kyïvs'koï Rusi (Kyiv 1980)
- Pyotr Rappoport (П. А. Раппопорт) (1993). Ancient Russian Architecture (Древнерусская архитектура) (in Russian). Saint-Petersburg.
