= Rusov =

Rusov or Russov is a Slavic male surname, its feminine counterpart is Rusova or Russova. Notable people with the surname include:

- Dobrivoj Rusov (born 1993), Slovak association football player
- Lev Russov (1926–1987), Russian painter, graphic artist, and sculptor
- Nađa Rusov (born 2005)
- Sofia Rusova (1856-1940), Ukrainian educator
