= Chernihiv Philharmony =

Concert hall in Chernihiv, Ukraine

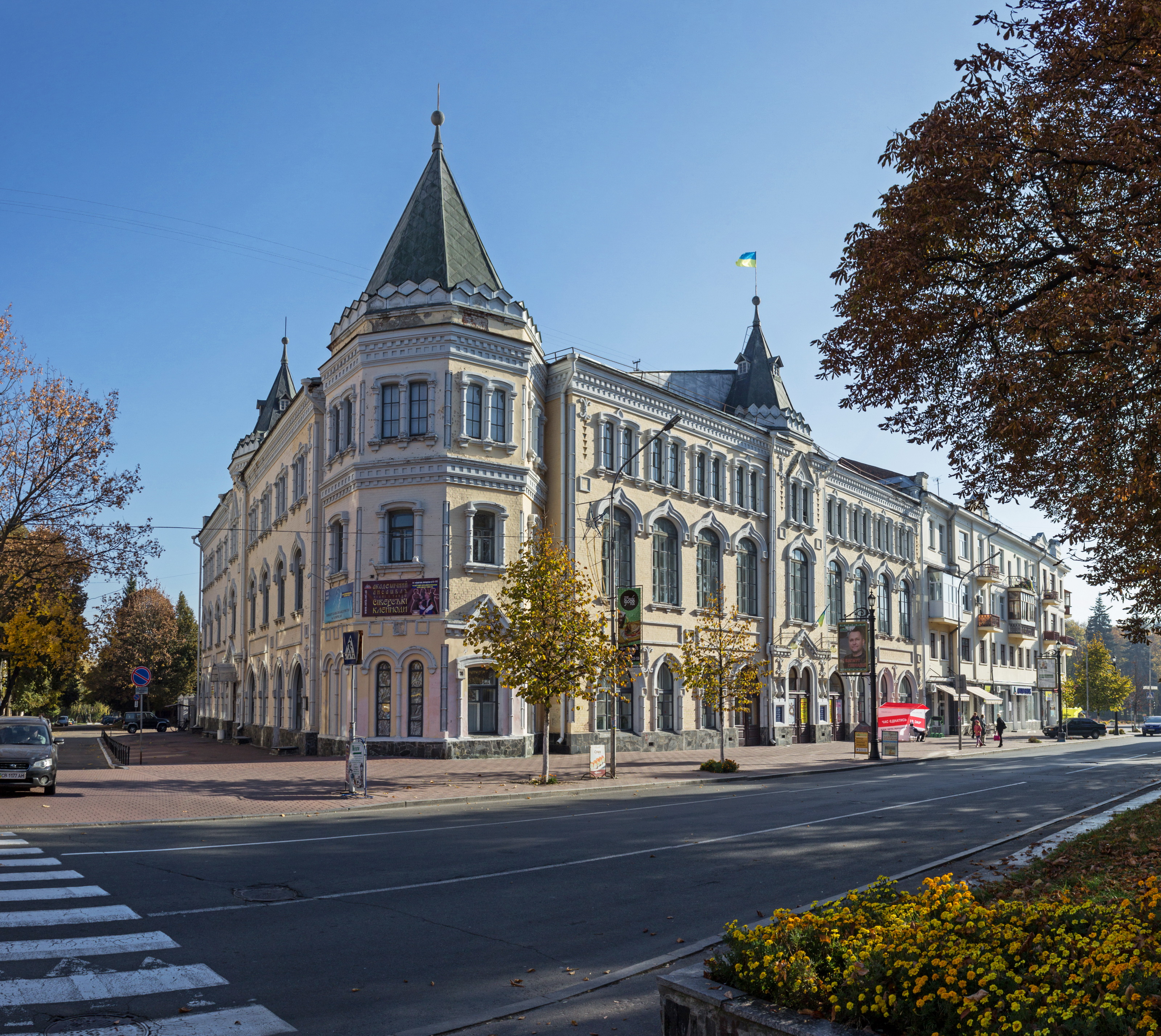

Religion
- Year consecrated: 1944

Location
- Location: Myru Avenue, 15 Chernihiv, Ukraine
- Interactive map of Chernihiv Philharmony
- Coordinates: 51°29′13″N 31°18′19″E

Architecture
- Style: Russian Revival architecture
- Completed: 19th-20th centuries
- Capacity: 612 seats (in 1964)

Chernihiv Philharmony or the Chernihiv Oblast Philharmonic Centre for Festivals and Concerts (Ukrainian: Чернігівський обласний філармонійний центр фестивалів та концертних програм) is located just few meters from Krasna Square in the center of Chernihiv, Ukraine was founded in 1944. This building is an example of Russian Revival architecture that was popular at the turn of the 19th and 20th centuries.

== History ==
First Philharmonic housed in the former convent Eletski. In August 1941, the building was burned during the Nazi bombings. In the postwar years Philharmonic has been restored with the superstructure 3rd floor. In 2000, the Chernihiv Regional Philharmonic Society was reorganized into the Regional Philharmonic Center festivals and concert programs.

== Events ==
In 2014 Anna Binneweg made her European conducting young orchestra debut Chernihiv Philharmony.

== Gallery ==
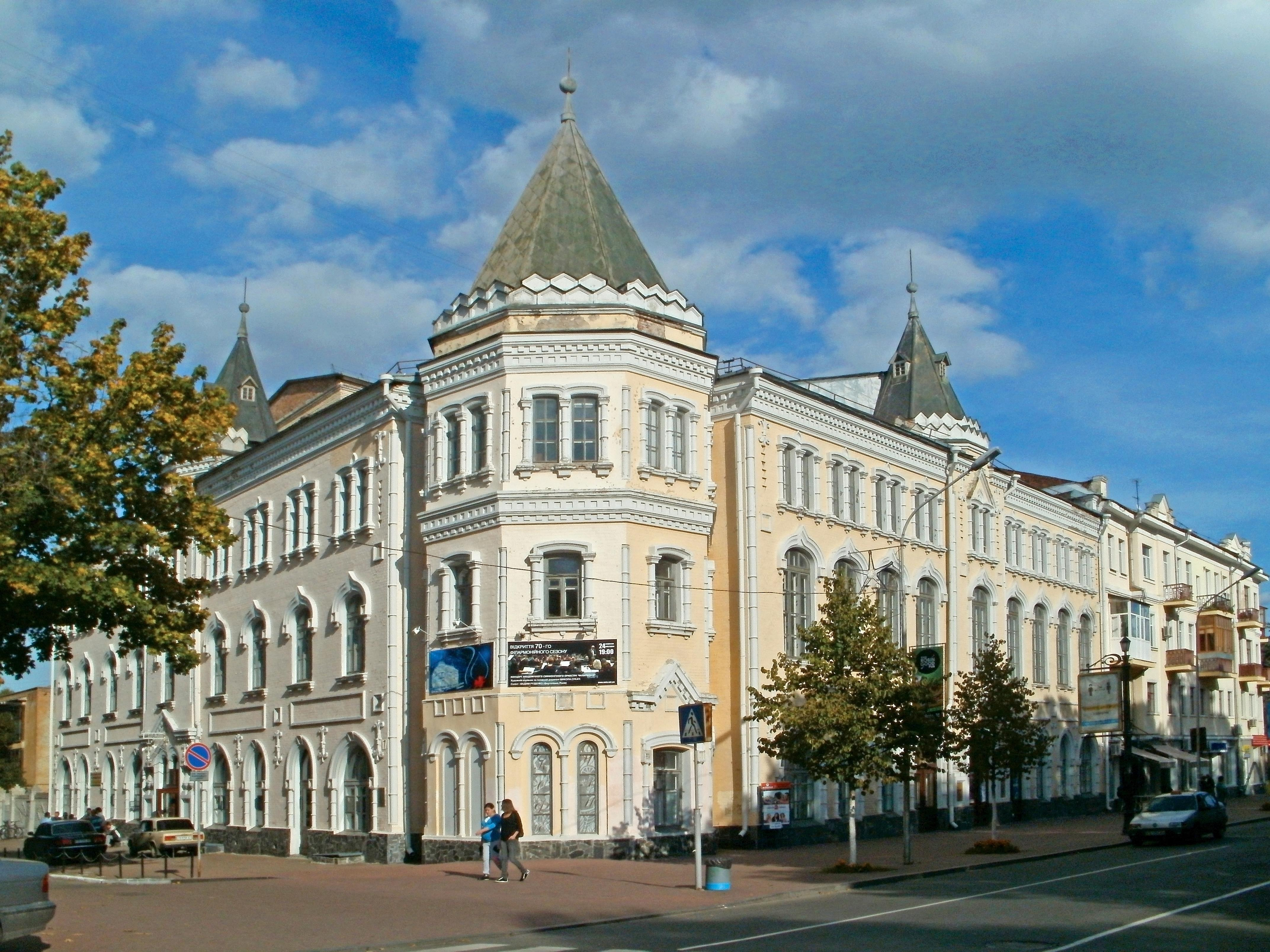

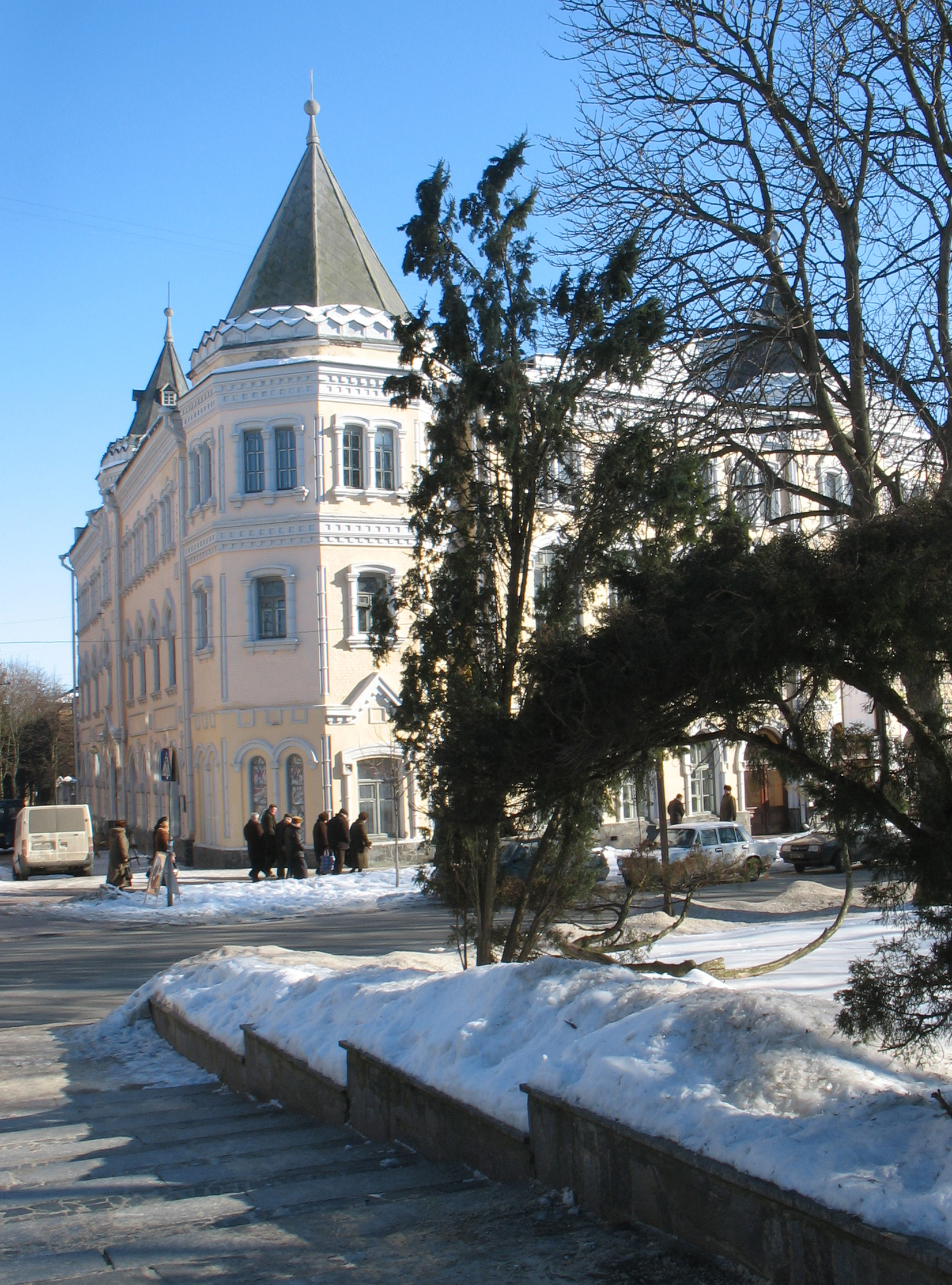

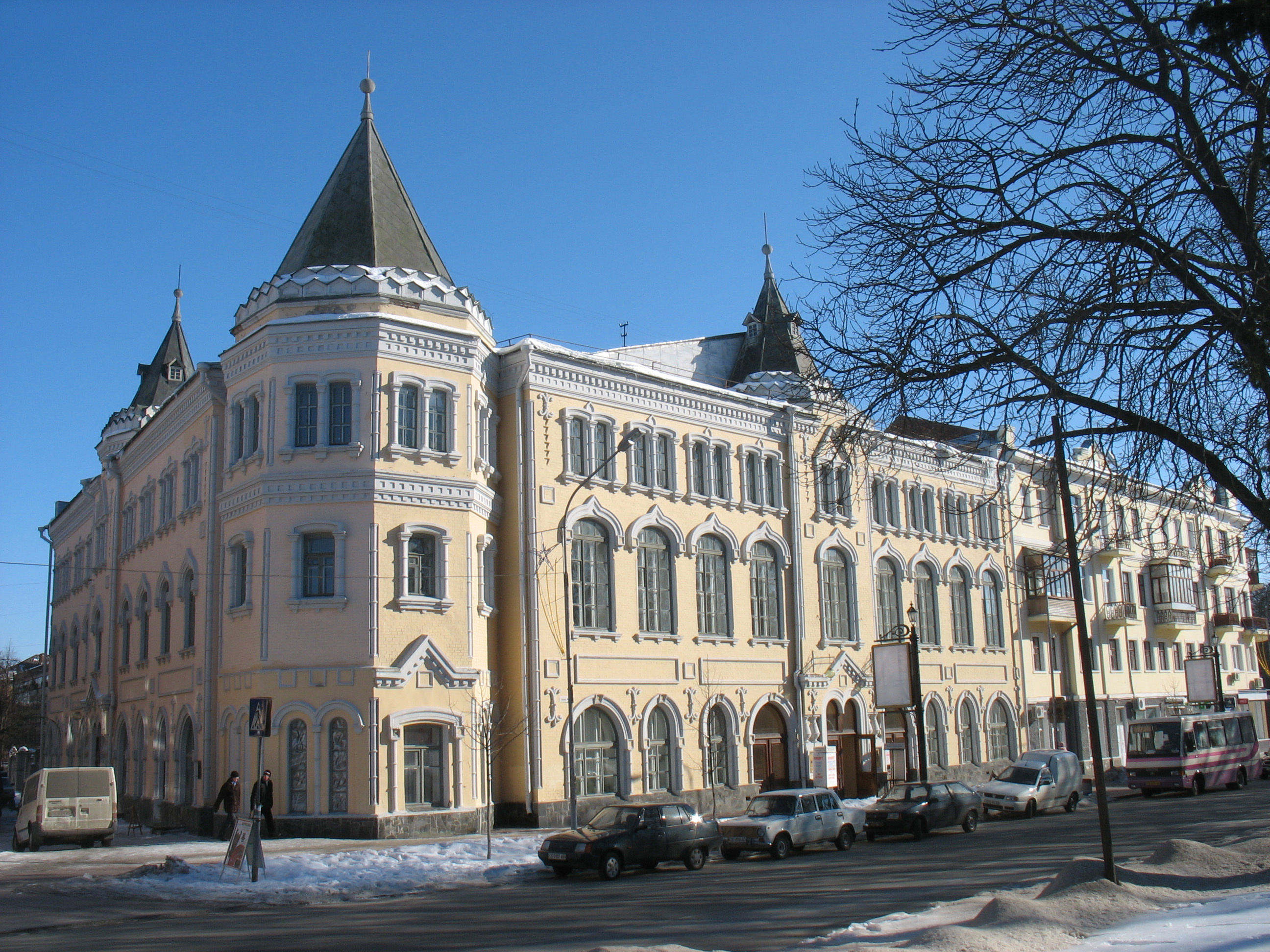

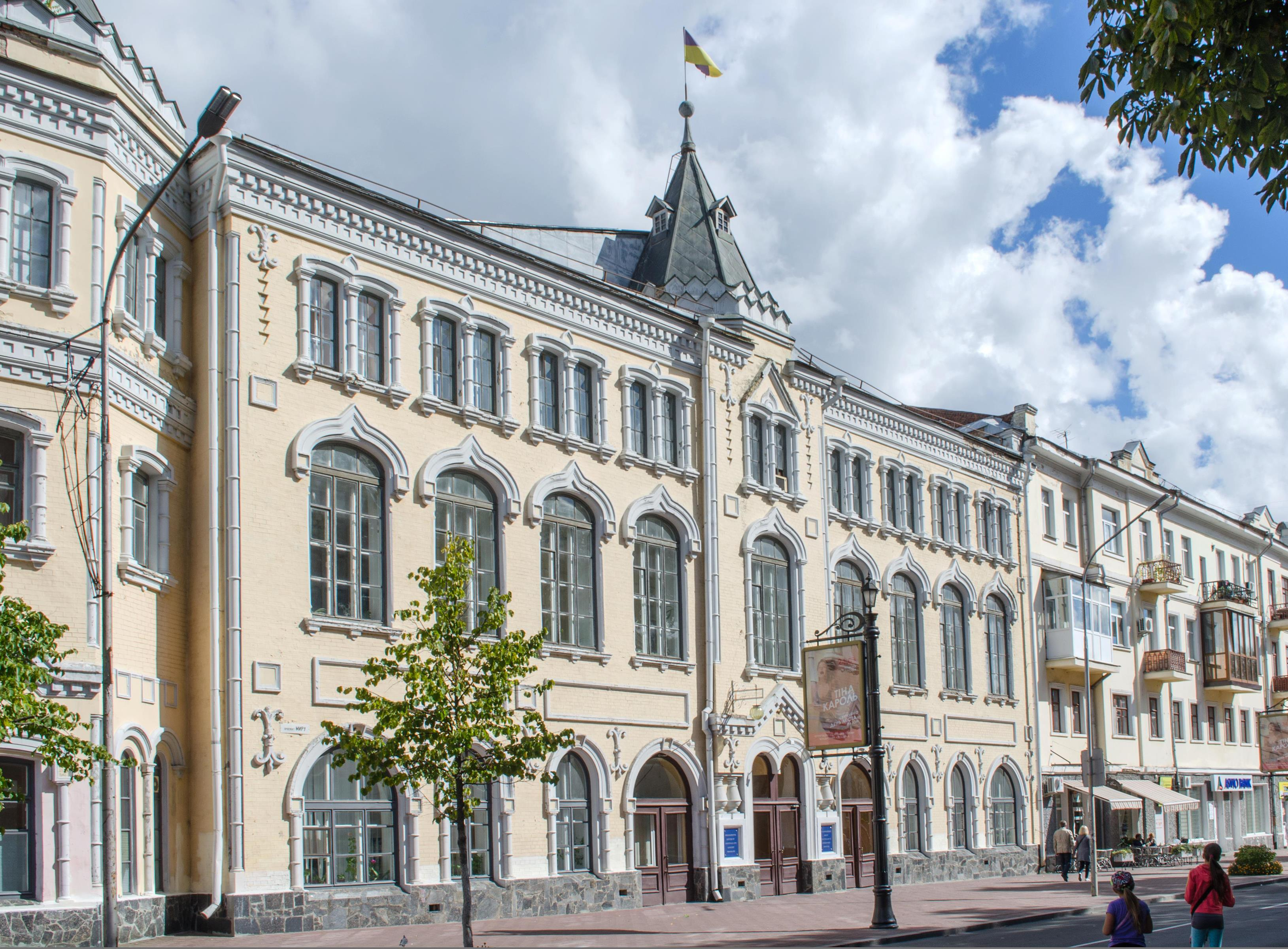

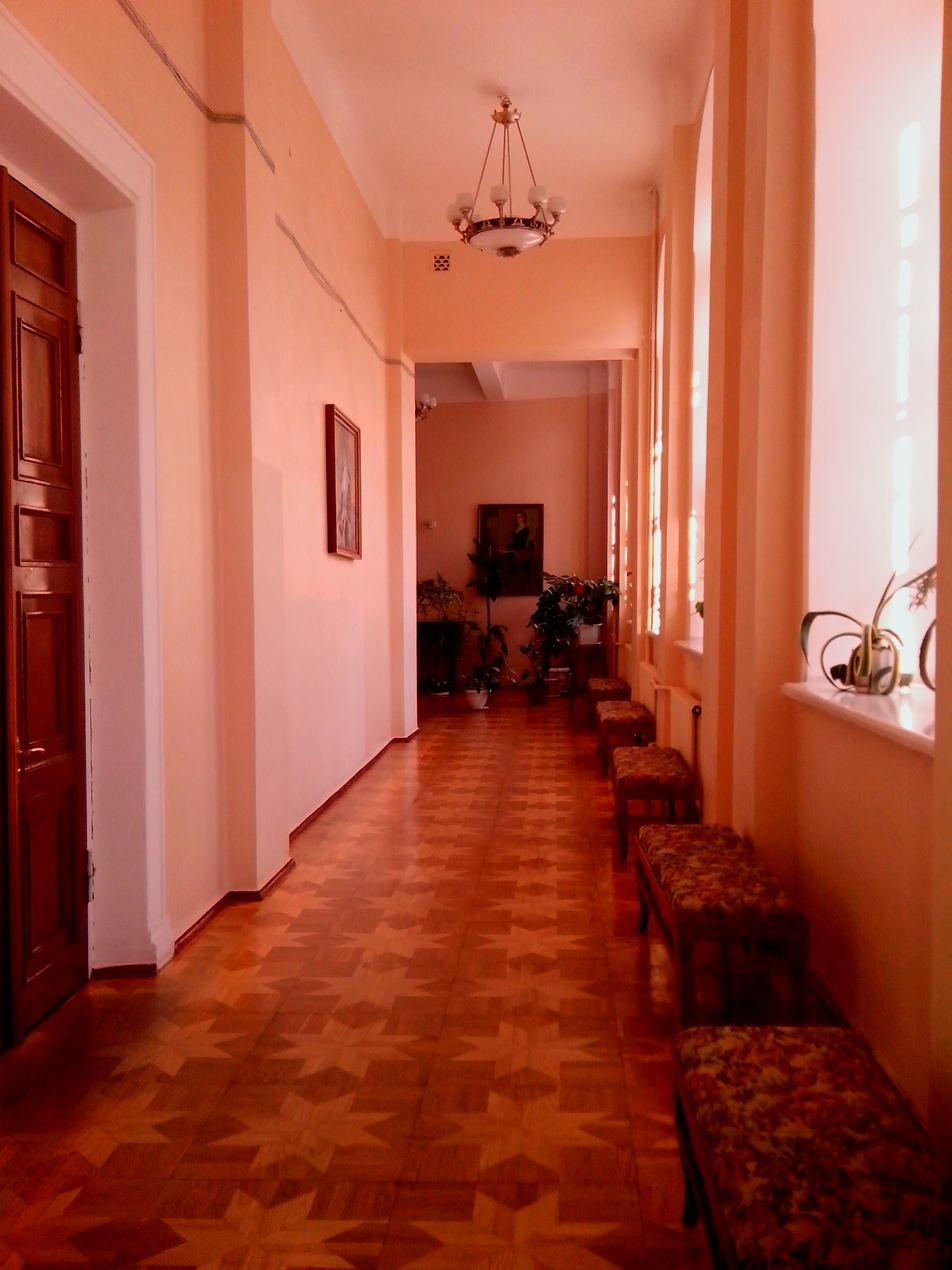
Chernihiv Philharmonic corridor left

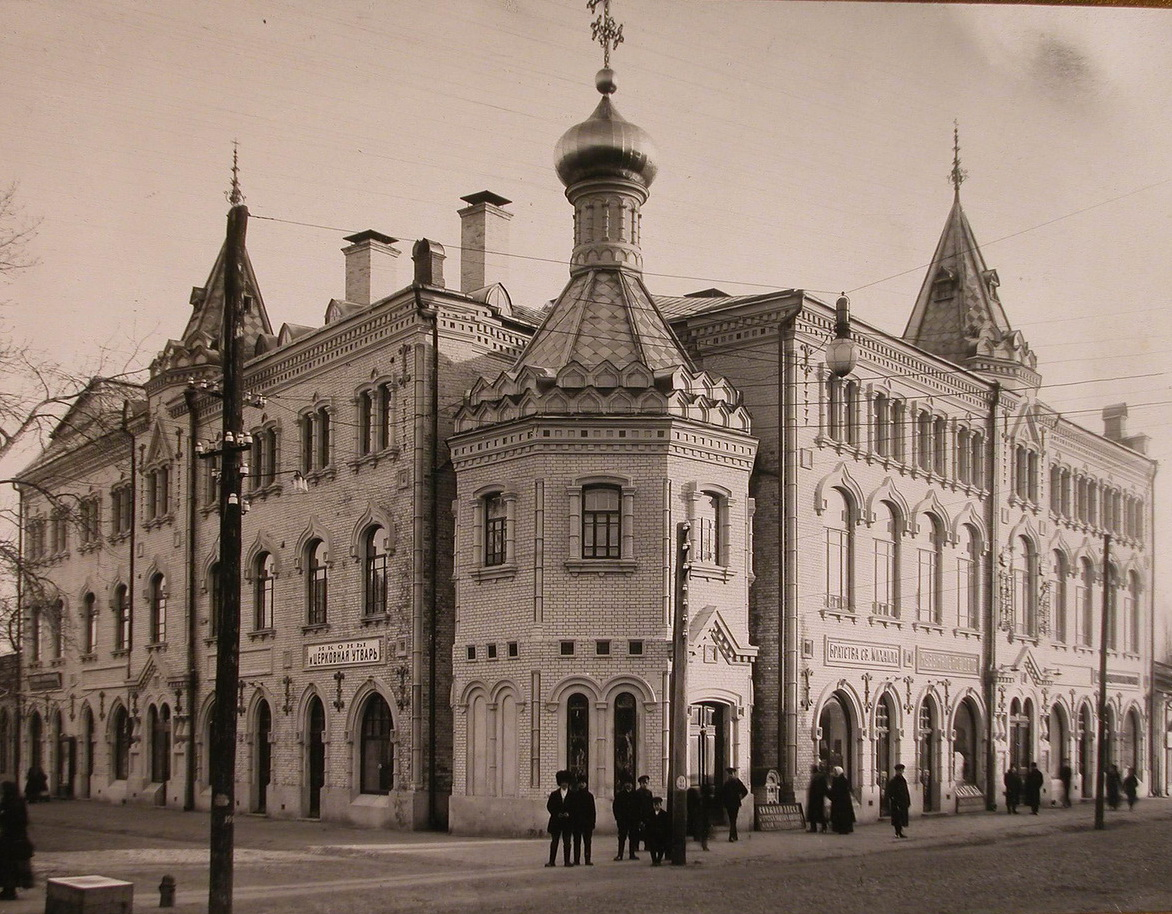
In 1911
