= Church of the Archangel Michael, Chernihiv =

Church of the Archangel Michael
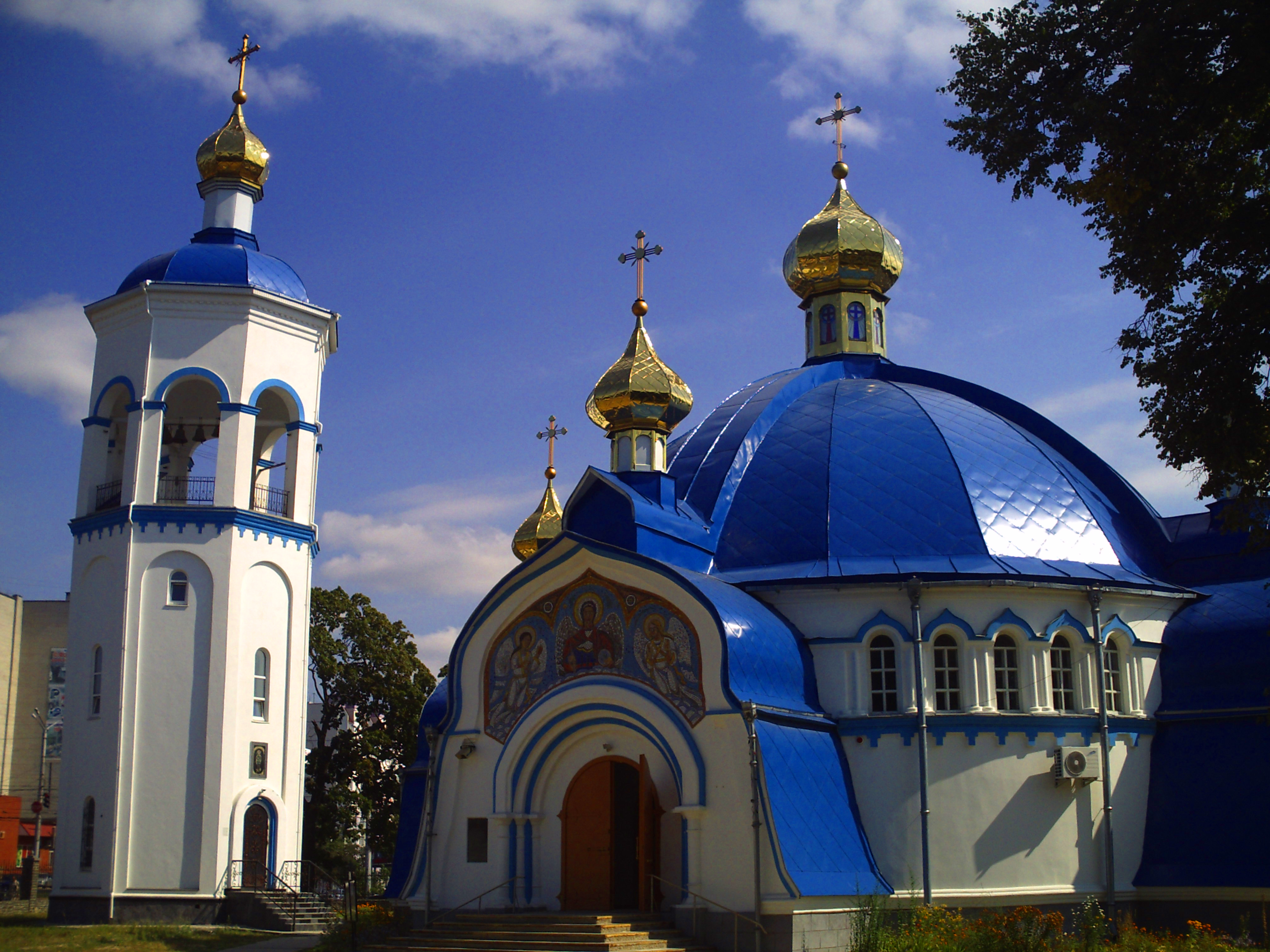
- The main facade
- Church of the Archangel Michael
- 51.5124681°N 31.2775358°E
- Location: Chernihiv
- Country: Ukraine
- Denomination: Ukrainian Orthodox Church (Moscow Patriarchate)

History
- Founded: 2001

Architecture
- Architect(s): Oleg Sleptsov, Viktor Ustinov
- Completed: 2011

The Church of the Archangel Michael in Chernihiv (Ukrainian: Свято-Михайлівський храм (Чернігів)) is a functioning church in the city of Chernihiv, located on the corner of Myru Avenue and Kozatska (formerly 50 years of the Komsomol) and Boyova (Heroes of Chornobyl) streets. The parish belongs to the Chernihiv Diocese of the Ukrainian Orthodox Church (Moscow Patriarchate).

== History ==
This neighborhood of Chernihiv is densely populated, with many Orthodox residents, but there was no church or spiritual and educational center. This was the main reason why this place was chosen for construction. Construction of the church began in 2001, a year later it was consecrated (2002). In 2011, construction was almost completed.

A significant material contribution to its construction was made by OJSC Chernihivoblenergo in the person of the chairman of the Board Yuriy Mykhailovych Lisnyak. For this charitable activity the church awarded Yu. M. Lisnyak the Order of the Apostolic Grand Duke Volodymyr of the third degree. He is the head of the community.

== Name ==
The church is named after Archangel Michael. Archangel Michael has been glorified in Kievan Rus' since ancient times. Churches and monasteries were built in his honor throughout Russia. The Archangel Cathedral was built in ancient Kyiv immediately after the adoption of Christianity. St. Michael the Archangel is considered by the people to be the heavenly patron and defender of Kyiv.

== Architecture ==
The architecture of the Church of St. Michael the Archangel is, to some extent, unique: it is a round (rotunda) church. The Church of the Holy Sepulchre in Jerusalem also has the shape of a rotunda with a dome. The church was designed by Kyiv architect Oleg Sleptsov. The design was altered during the construction process at the request of the church community. The bell tower, as well as the landscaping, was designed by Chernihiv architect Viktor Ustinov.

The church is one-storey, in a circle there are windows, which are grouped by 5 in four pairs. The windows are framed with simple platbands. The temple has 3 entrances: central - west and two side: south and north. There are no wall paintings. Under the windows in a circle are icons: 10 icons in simple icon case and 4 icons - in complex.

== Iconostasis ==
The main decoration of the church is a 3-tiered iconostasis. The project of the iconostasis, as well as the carving was executed by Oleksiy Korets. He also made carved kiosks for icons. Everything is done in a single style. In the center of the iconostasis is the royal doors, which rises to the height of two tiers. They depict four evangelists and the composition "Annunciation". The carving is gilded. In the first tier of the iconostasis to the left of the royal gates is the icon of the Virgin and Child, and on the deacon's door is the icon of Archdeacon Lawrence, depicted in full length with a scroll in his hand. To the right of the royal gate is the icon of Jesus Christ. Christ is depicted in full length with the gospel in his hand. On the Ponomarev door - the icon "St. Archdeacon Stephen. Above the royal gates is the icon of the Last Supper. On the second tier there are 8 holiday icons: "Christmas", "Introduction to the Temple", "Nativity of the Mother of God", "New Testament Trinity", "Jesus Christ", "Annunciation", "Assumption of the Mother of God", "Baptism". All icons are in simple frames. On the third tier above the royal gate is a large icon "Jesus Christ - King of Glory" and 8 icons depicting the apostles. The iconostasis ends with a cross. All icons were painted by icon painter Volodymyr from Novhorod-Siverskyi. To the left of the iconostasis is the "Crucifixion", to the right - the composition "Resurrection".

== Bell tower ==
In addition to the temple, a bell tower was built on the territory. It is octagonal in plan, 34 meters high, on the fourth tier there are 8 bells. There is a Sunday school for children, there will be a well with holy water.

== Gallery ==
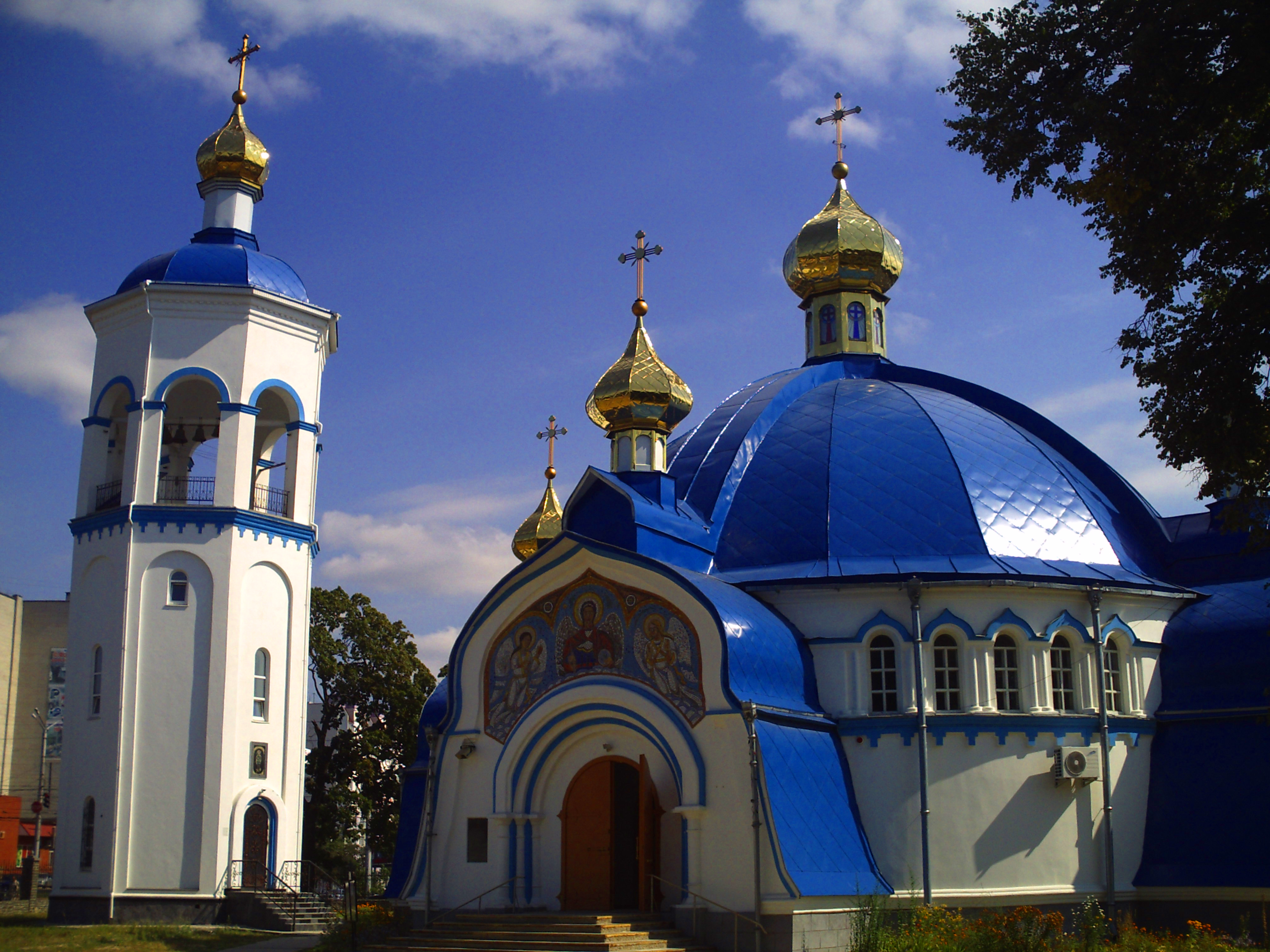

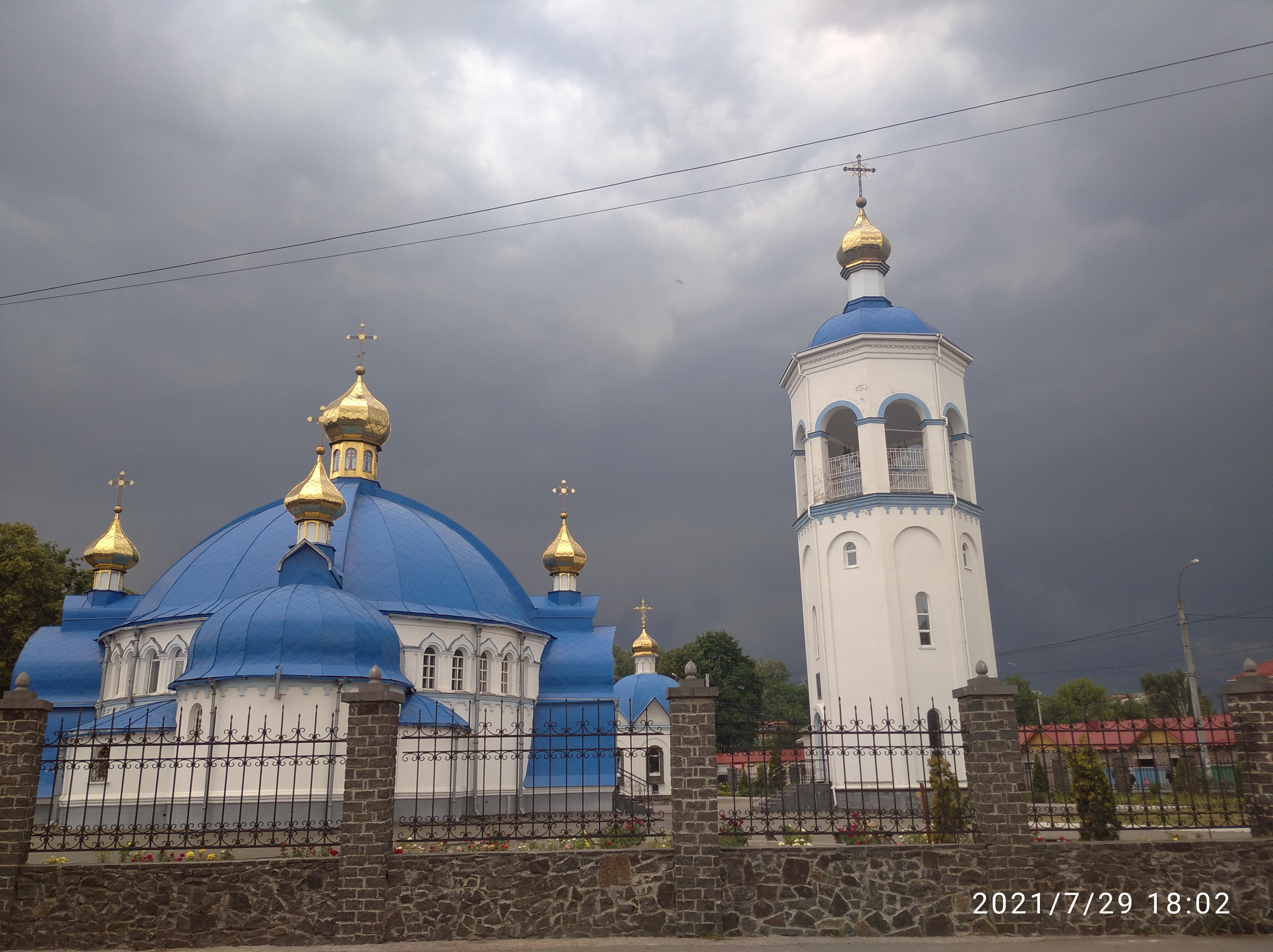

== See also ==
- List of Churches and Monasteries in Chernihiv
- List of St. Michael's Church
