= Sofia and Oleksandr Rusov Chernihiv Regional Universal Scientific Library =

Library in Chernihiv, Ukraine

- Чернігівська обласна універсальна наукова бібліотека імені Софії та Олександра Русових
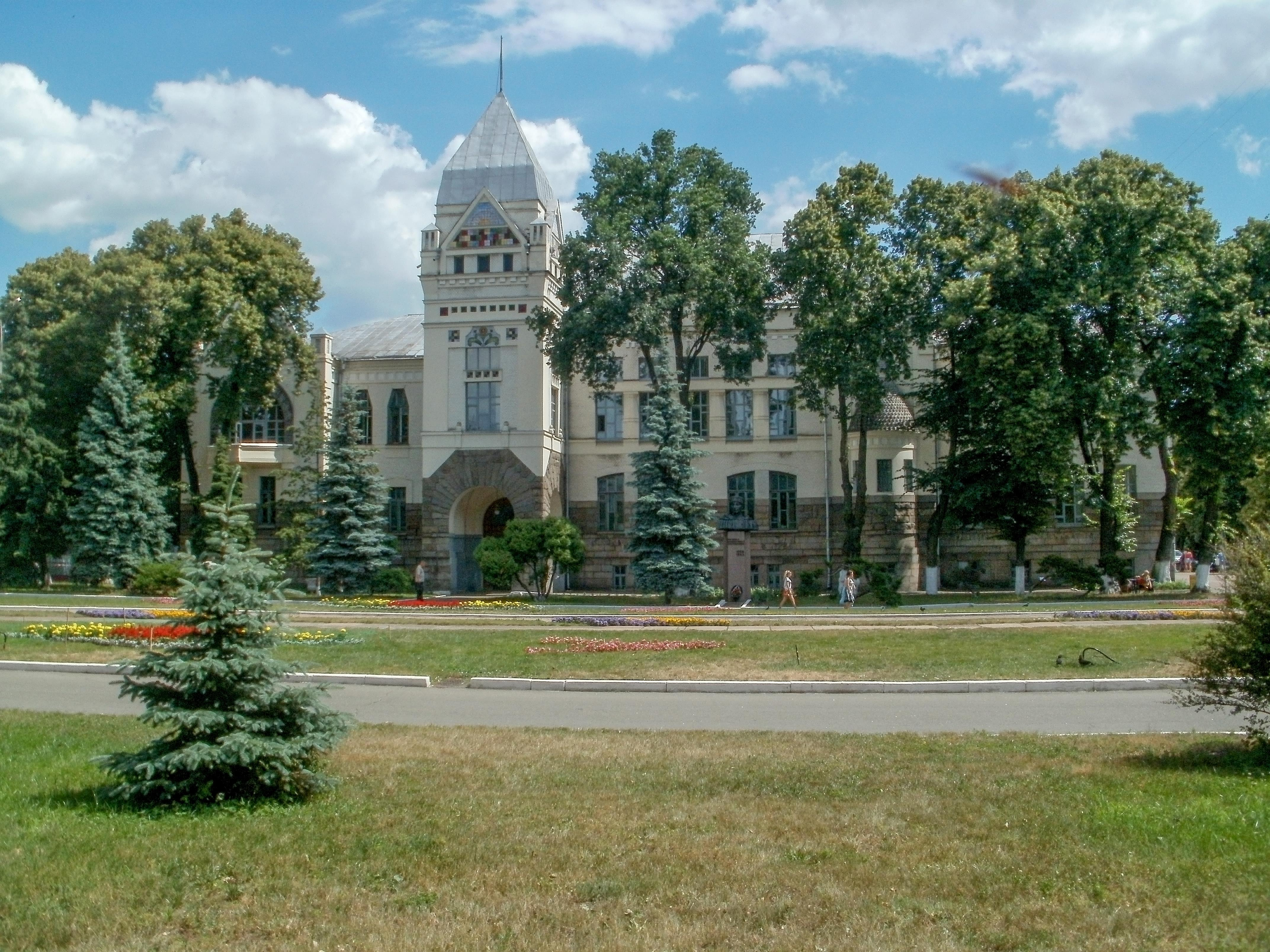
- 51°29′48″N 31°17′32″E
- Location: Myru Avenu, Chernihiv, Chernihiv Oblast, Ukraine, 14000, Ukraine
- Established: 15 March 1877

Other information
- Director: Sobol Yuri Oleksiyovych (since 2023)
- Website: libkor.com.ua

The Sofia and Oleksandr Rusov Chernihiv Regional Universal Scientific Library (Ukrainian: Чернігівська обласна універсальна наукова бібліотека імені Софії та Олександра Русових, romanized: Chernihivska oblasna universalna naukova biblioteka imeni Sofii ta Oleksandra Rusovykh) is a public library in Chernihiv, Ukraine. It is the largest library in the Chernihiv Oblast and is devoted to culture, education, history, and science. The library has over 800,000 documents, most of which are scientific reference books and publications. It is notable for its collection of over 15,000 rare editions from the 19th and early 20th centuries, including 5,700 from before the 1917 Russian Revolution.

From 1922 to 2023, the library bore the name of the Russian-Ukrainian writer Vladimir Korolenko. In June 2023, it was renamed after two of the original founders, Sofia Rusova and her husband Oleksander Rusov.

The library is equipped with a common reading room, six specialized reading rooms, and two computer rooms with free Wi-Fi access. There are about 30 different clubs in the library. Literary evenings, exhibitions, presentations and conferences are regularly held at the library. It is located within the historic building of the Noble and Peasant Land Bank, considered a National Heritage Site in Ukraine.

== History ==
=== Origin ===
The Chernihiv Public Library was founded on 28 March [O.S. 15 March] 1877 by a group of local intellectuals, including Oleksandr Tyshchynsky, Sofia Rusova, Oleksandr Rusov, Petro Chervinsky, O. M. Borsuk, O. P. Karpinsky, M. O. Konstantinovich, K. D. Miloradovich, Vasyl Varzar, and Ivan Rashevsky. During its first year of operation, it was intended as a "newspaper reading room," only becoming a library on 18 February 1878. The initial collection of books was donated by the founders themselves, especially Oleksandr Tyshchynsky and Stepan Nis, who donated their own personal libraries. Monetary donations for the maintenance of the institution and the purchase of new books came from members of the board, various cultural institutions, and over time, from payment for the use of books. By the end of its first year of operation, the library catalogue had 564 books.

During its first eight years, the library did not have its own premises. It was finally allocated its own building, located on Preobrazhenskaya Street, by the city council in 1895.

The expansion of the library over the coming years was facilitated by the appointment of Mykhailo Kotsiubynsky, Mykola Voronyi, and other writers to the board, with additional help from the Chernihiv municipality and the Prosvita society. The influx of attention allowed the library to organize folk readings, public lectures, and concerts, turning it into a center for dissidents of the Russian Empire. In 1909, under the pretext of the discovery of illegal literature, the Russian imperial government closed the library. The following year, the library was appropriated by the municipal government and renamed to the City Library.

=== Soviet period ===
After Chernihiv fell under the control of the rapidly expanding Soviet Union in 1919, the municipal government was dissolved and the management of educational institutions, including libraries, was handed over to the People's Commissariat for Education. On 12 January 1919, the library was temporarily closed while it underwent "reorganization," eventually reopening in July of that same year as the "central provincial library."

In 1920, the library was moved to a new building on Sovetskaya street. In 1921, a fire destroyed a significant portion of the property and its valuables, hampering the library's regular operations. It was not until 1922 that it began to function regularly again, this time under the name of the writer Vladimir Korolenko. In 1934, it became a "state regional library."

During World War II, German air raids caused the total destruction of the library and its 216,000 documents on 24 August 1941. The German authorities tried to restore the library during its occupation of the city, gathering 148,000 volumes from various city libraries that had not yet been looted or destroyed. However, in 1943, while the Soviets fought to wrest the city from German control, this new collection was destroyed by fire again. Following the recapture of Chernihiv by the Soviets, the regular work of the library resumed on 1 December 1943.

After the war, the library slowly rebuilt its collection in its new home on 60 Popudrenko Street. In 1974, it was moved to its current building, located at 41 Lenina Street (now Myru Avenue), which was built in 1913 in the Ukrainian Art Nouveau architectural style and is now considered a historic monument.

On the occasion of the 100th anniversary of its founding in 1977, the library was awarded the Honorary Certificate of the Verkhovna Rada of the USSR.

=== Post-independence ===
By the 2000s, the Chernihiv Regional Universal Scientific Library had become a repository of considerable size and significance, serving as a cultural and scientific centre for not just the city, but the region as a whole. As such, it was often used as a supplementary educational institution for students of Chernihiv universities.

On 30 June 2018, the library's basement flooded after a heavy downpour, affecting 3,000 local periodicals and 26,000 art publications. The water level reached 1.65 m.

In 2022, the Russian invasion of Ukraine led to the bombing of the library on 30 March during the siege of Chernihiv.

On 6 June 2023, the Chernihiv Oblast Council voted to rename the library, replacing Korolenko with the names of two of the original founders, Sofia Rusova and Oleksandr Rusov. Since then, the library has borne the title Sofia and Oleksandr Rusov Chernihiv Regional Universal Scientific Library.

== Gallery ==
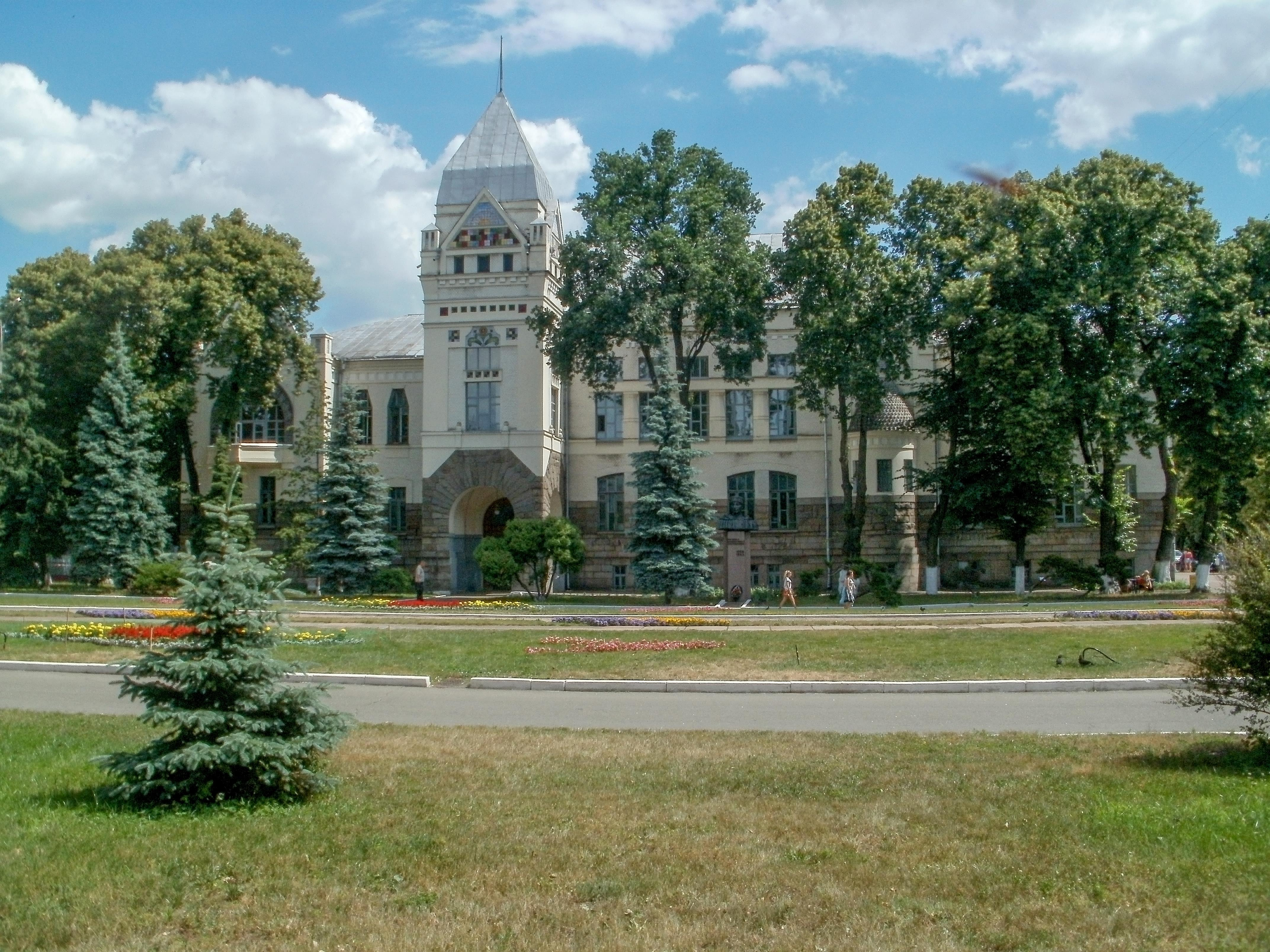

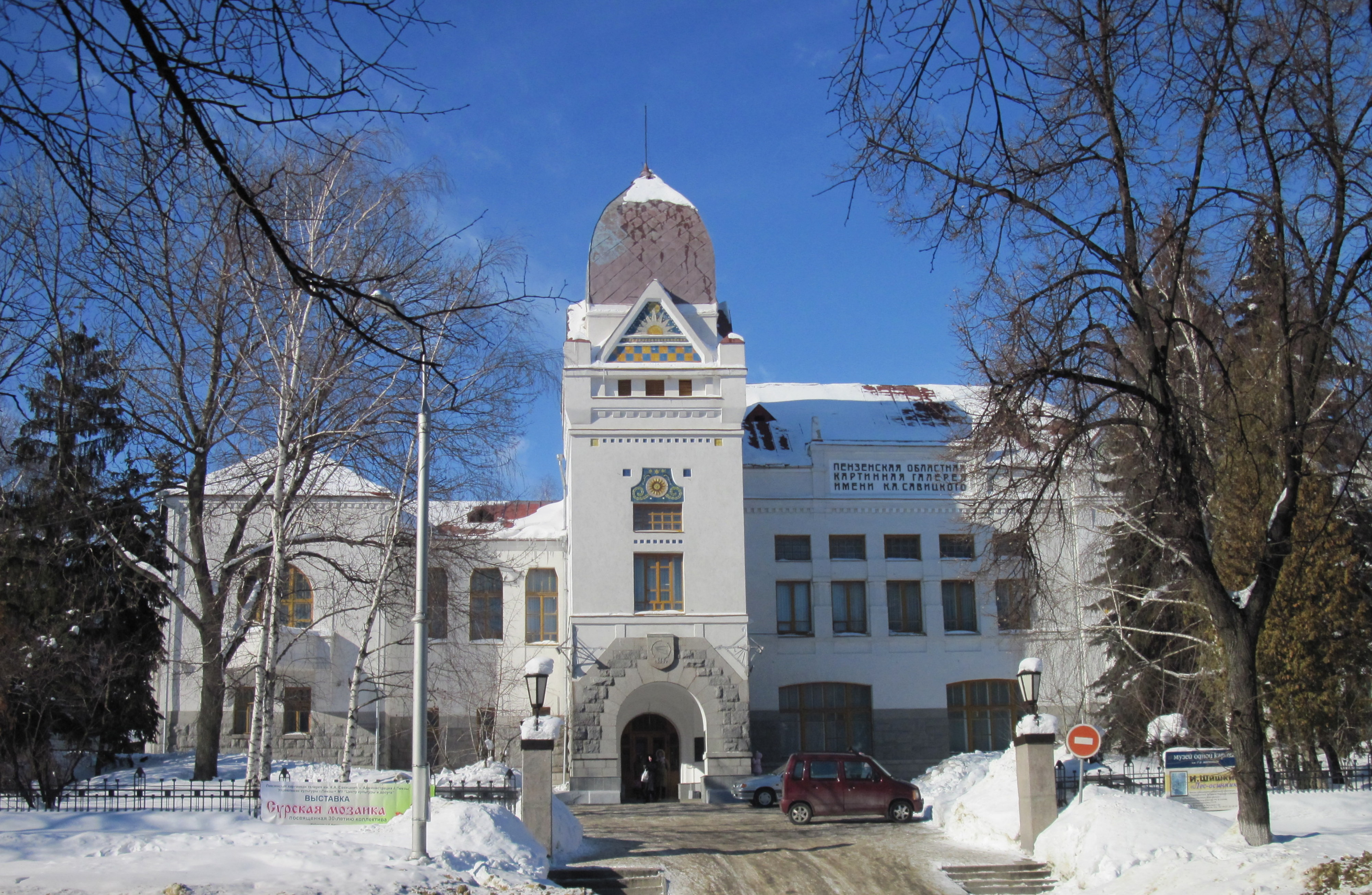

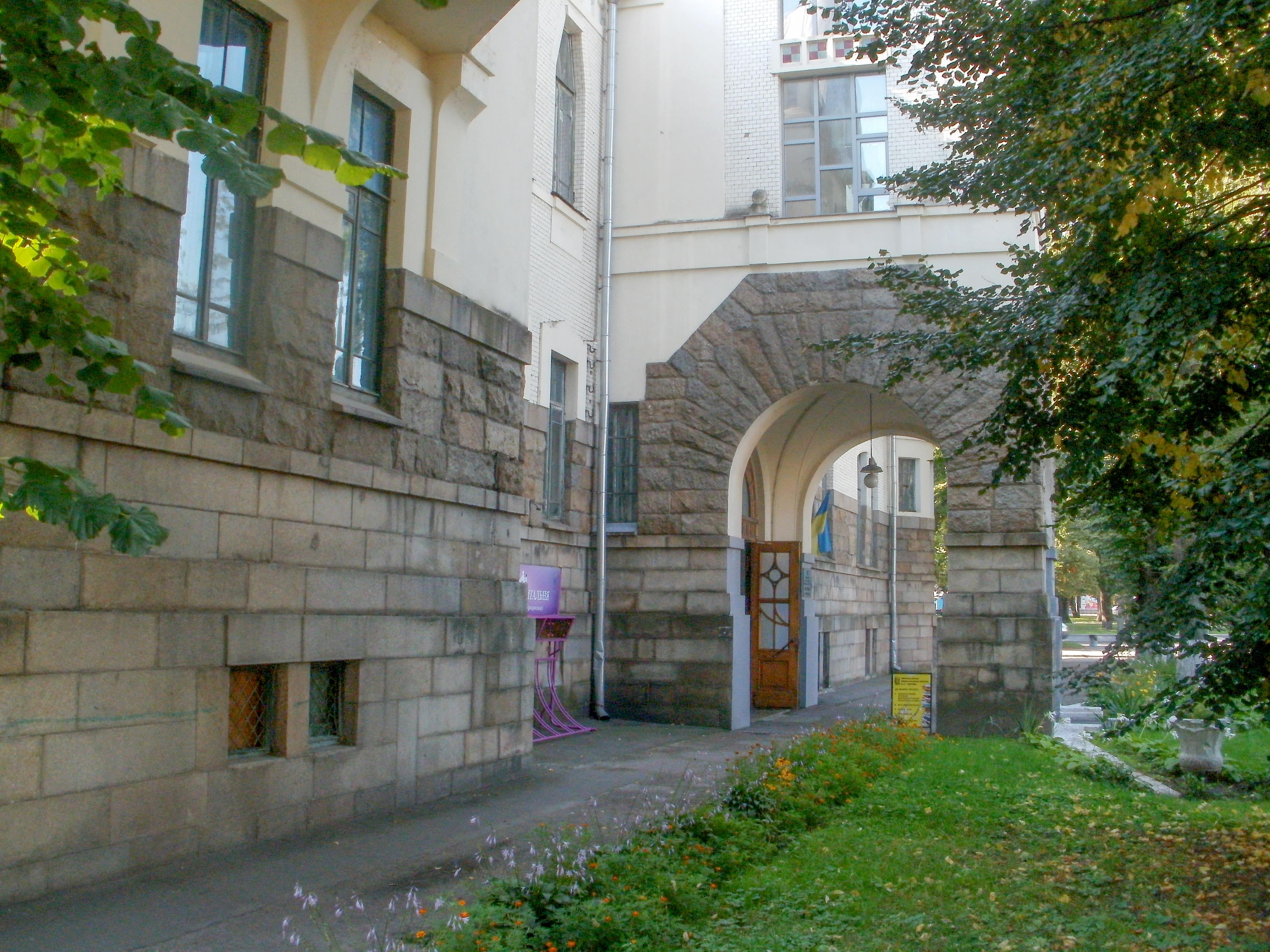

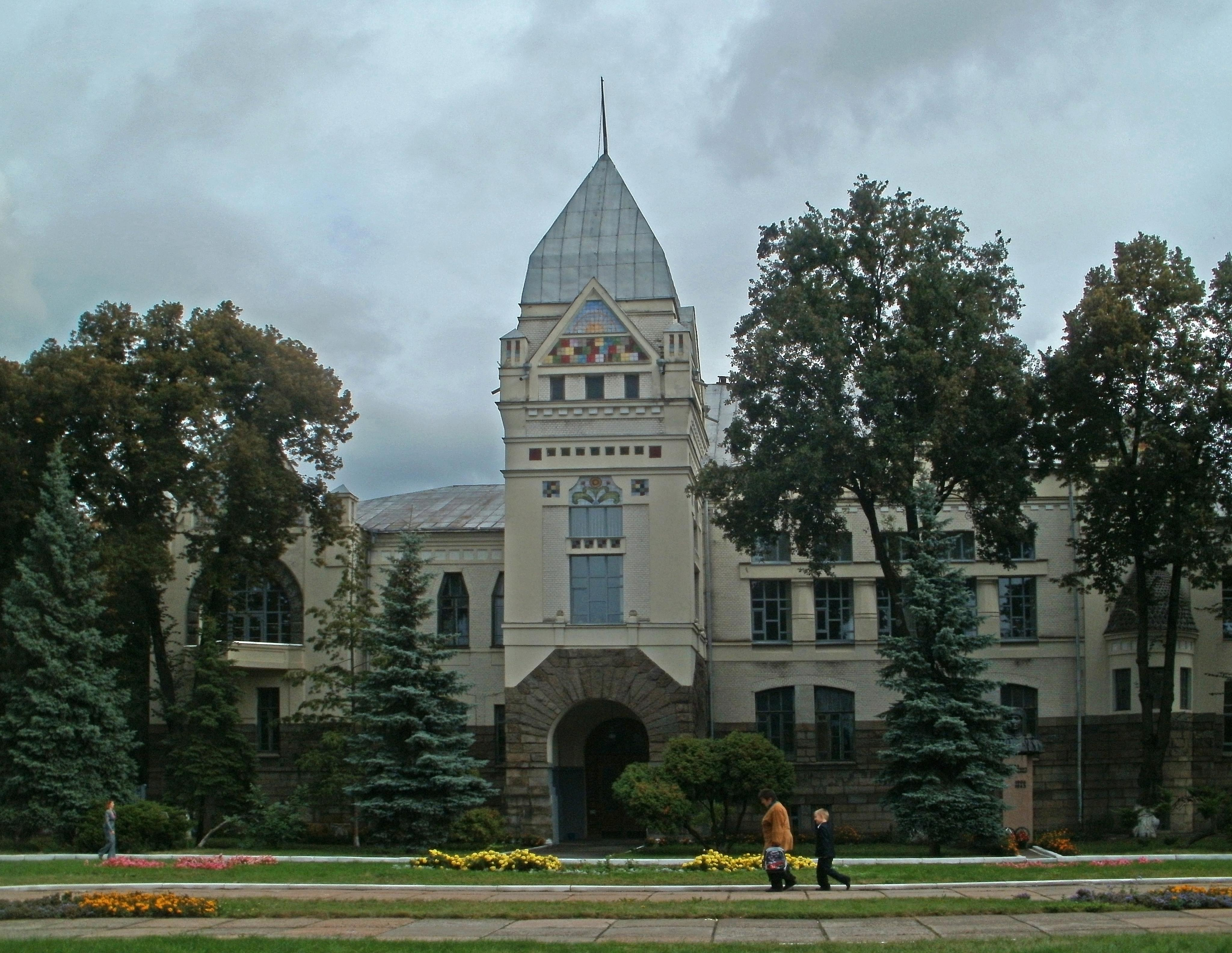

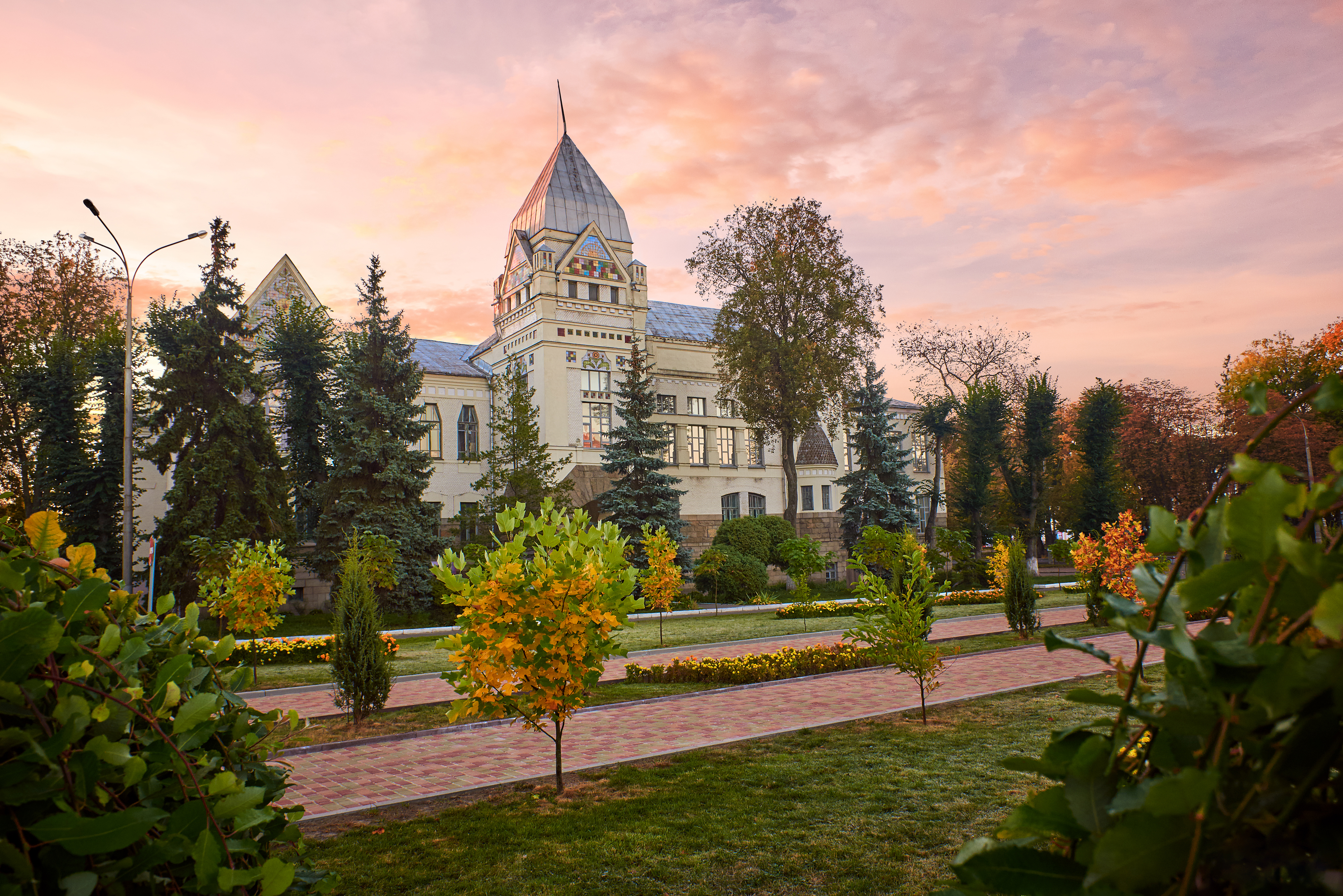

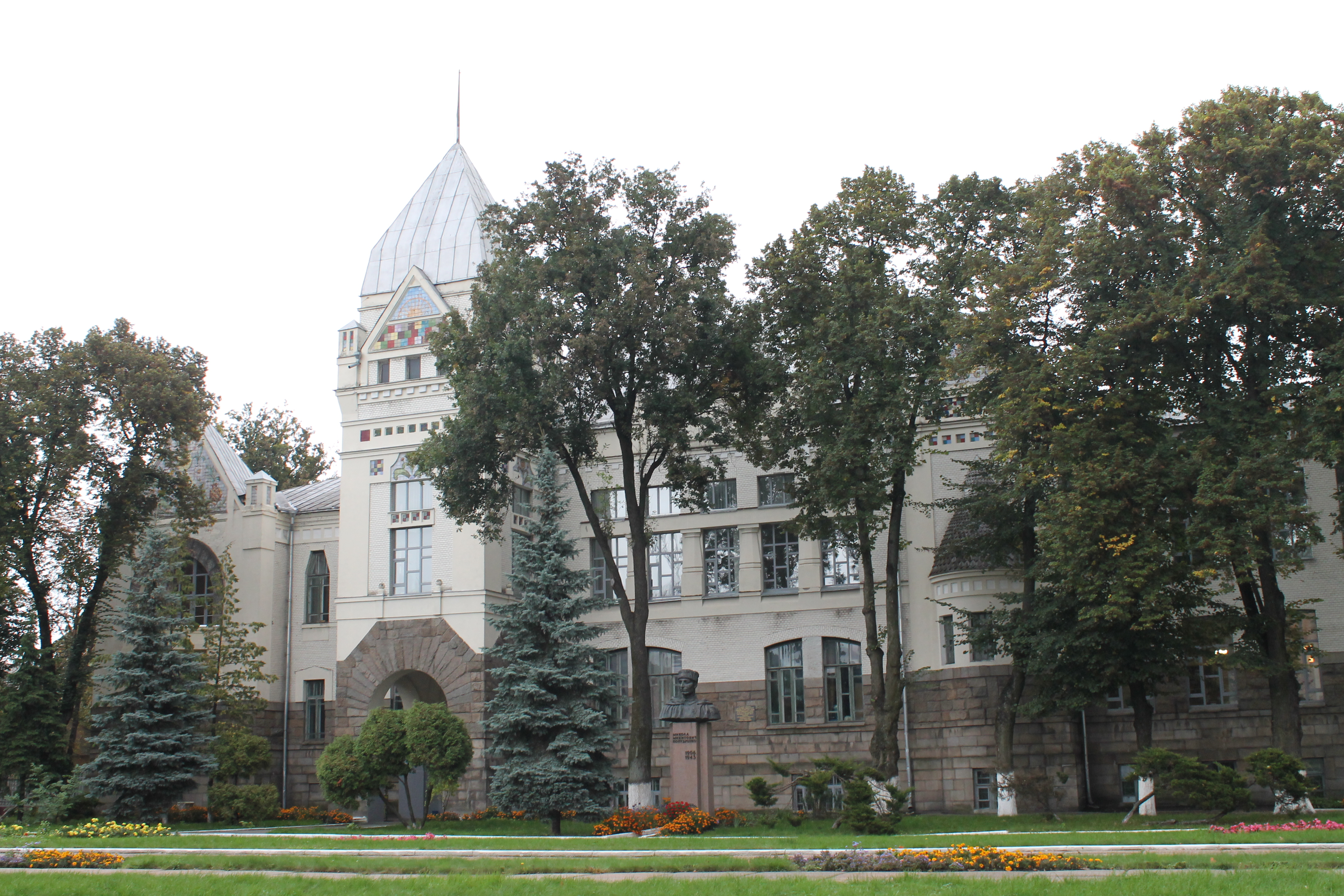

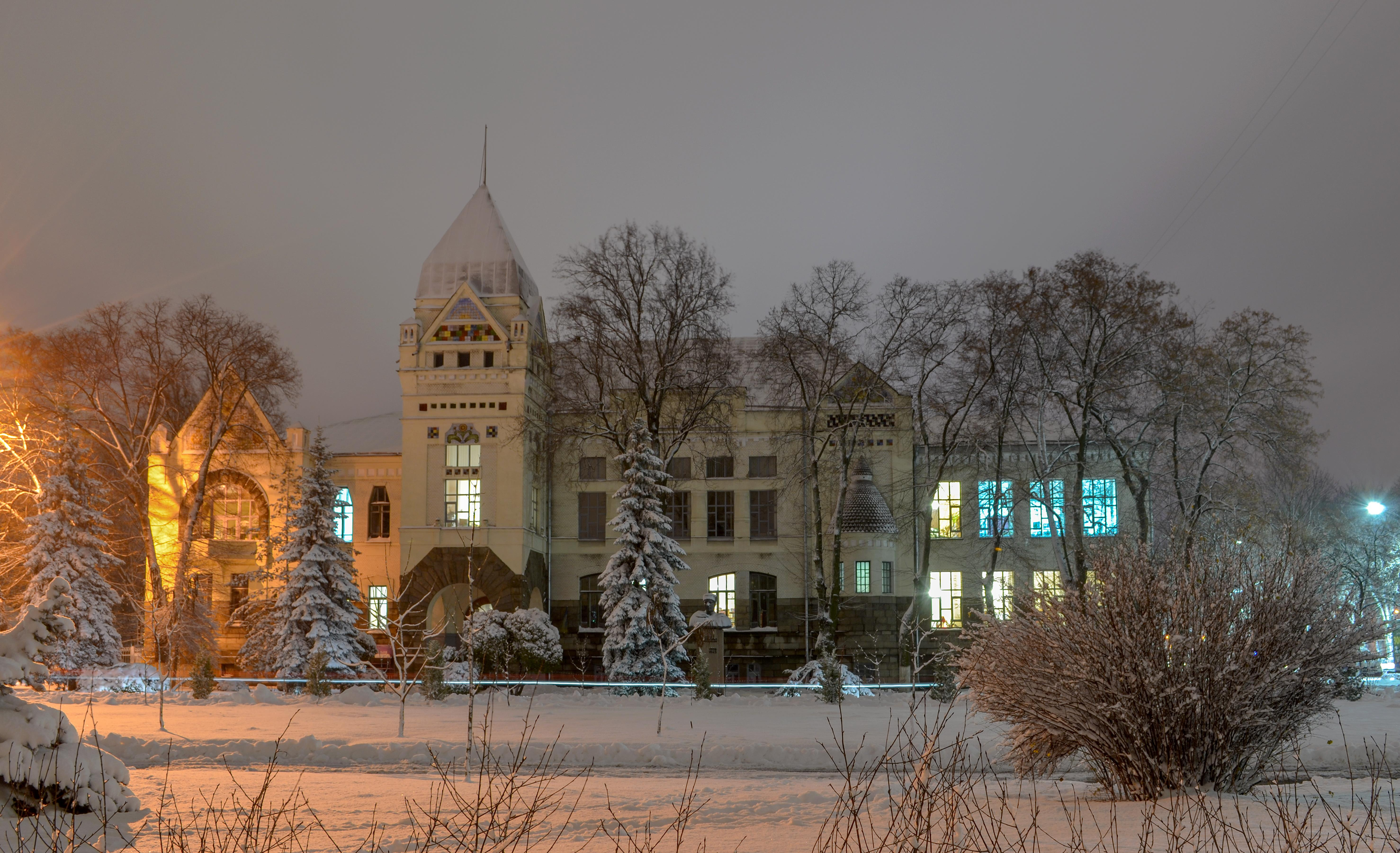

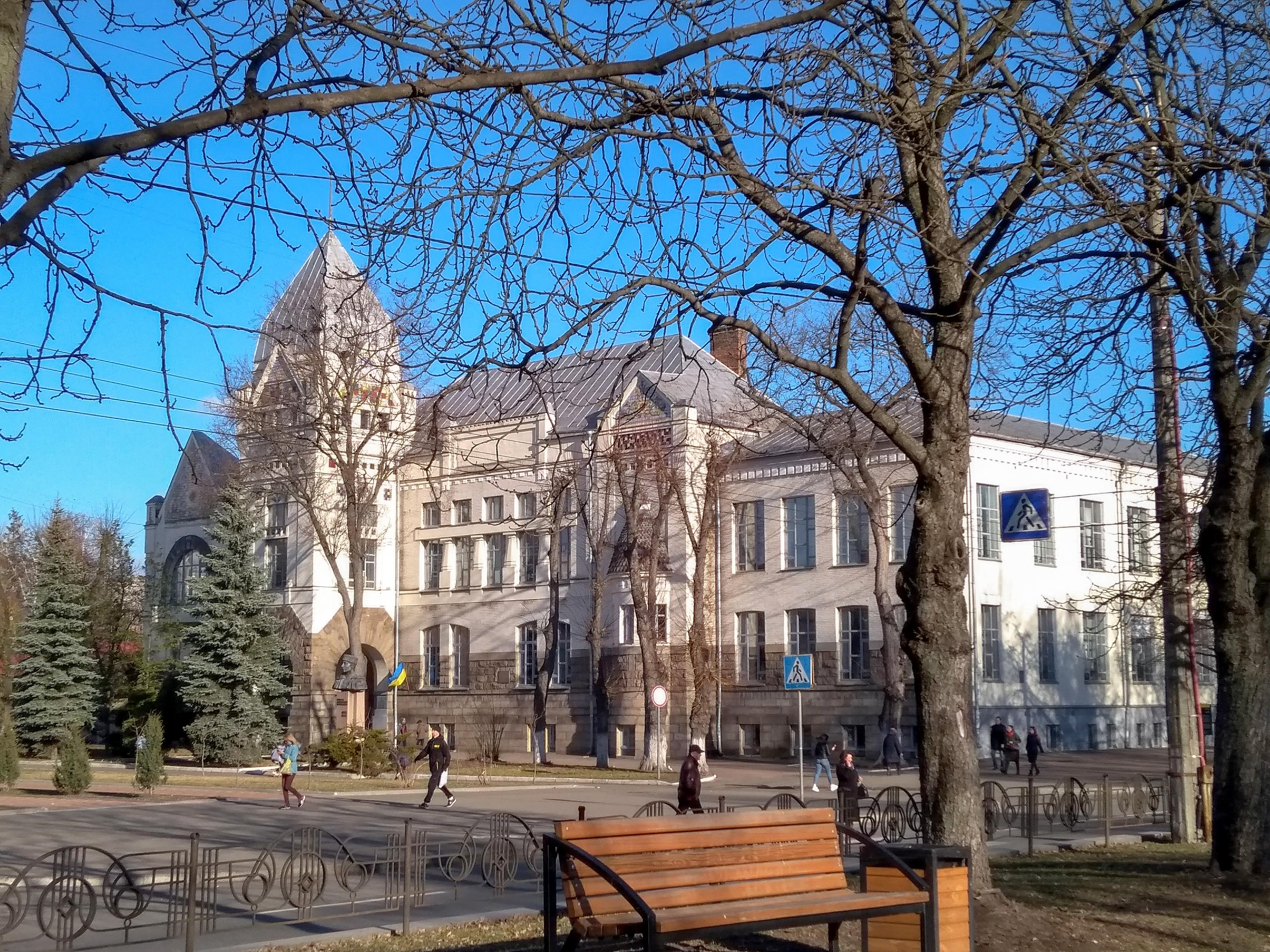

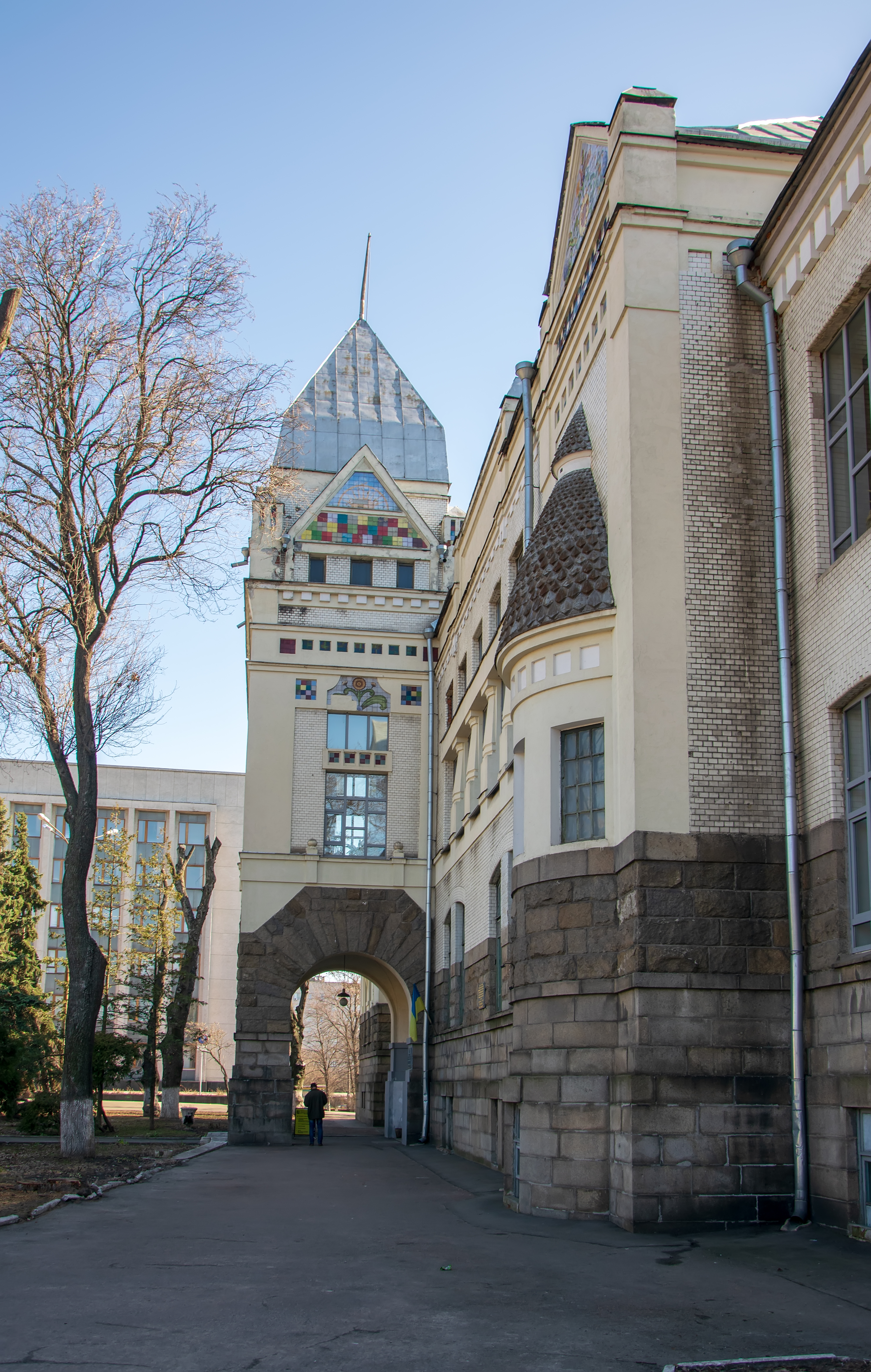

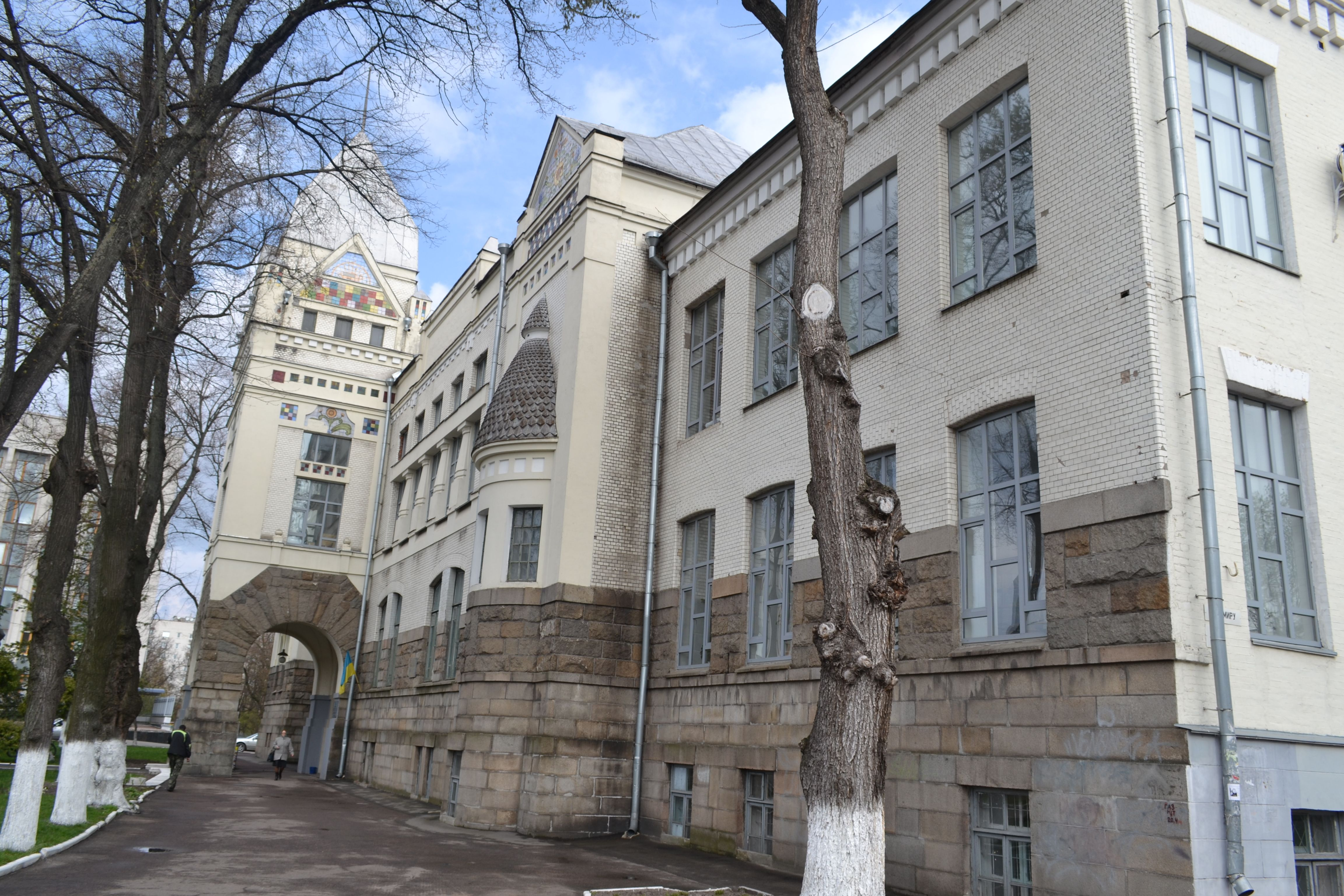

== See also ==
- List of libraries in Ukraine
