= Myru Avenue, Chernihiv =

Street in Chernihiv, Ukraine

Myru Avenue
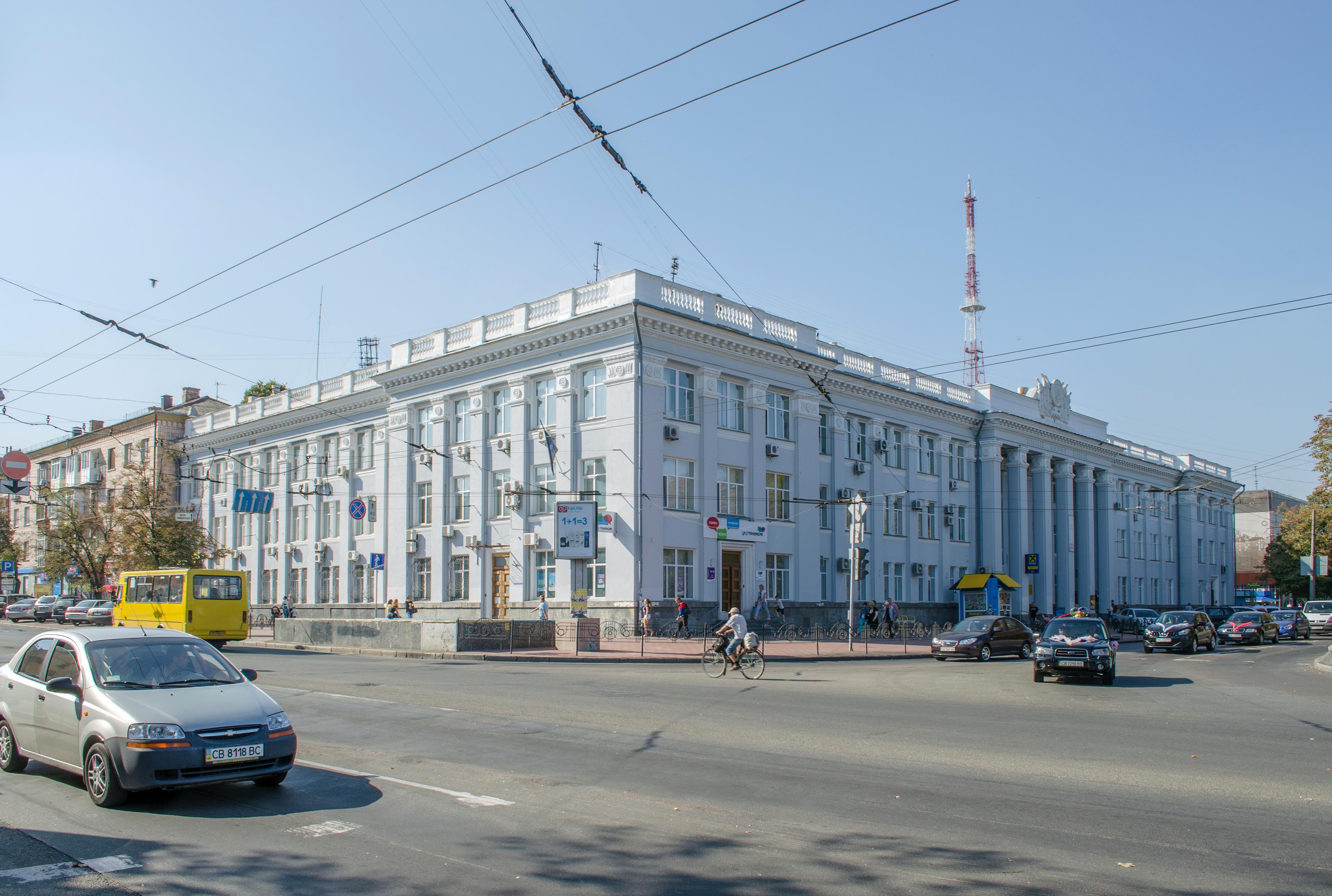
- View of the central Post Office in Chernihiv
- Interactive map of Myru Avenue
- Former name: Lenin Street
- Length: 7.2 km (4.5 mi)
- Location: Chernihiv, Chernihiv Oblast, Ukraine
- From: Catherine's Church and Dytynets Park
- Major junctions: Street Shevchenko, Victory Avenue, Kiltseva street
- To: Chernihiv Arena

Myru Avenue (Ukrainian: Проспект Миру) is a street in central Chernihiv. It starts from the southern outskirts of Chernihiv and Red Square. Extends north through the city to the city limits. Many streets and alleys adjoin the avenue. The beginning of the avenue passes through the center of Chernihiv, so there are many boutiques, several shopping centers, many cafes, restaurants, hotels "Ukraine" and "Gradetsky". In the area of visiting "Ukraine" Peace Avenue is transformed from Victory Avenue, another major highway in Chernihiv.

== Description ==
The avenue is very wide in the center, 4 lanes in each direction, for any length (from "Ukraine" to ZAZ), equipped with wires for trolleybuses. In the central part of the city there are 2 parks on the avenues - the Alley of Heroes and the Central Park. From Hradetsky to the end - 2 lanes on each side. The beginning of the name was Lenin Street until 2021.

== History ==
This street is first mentioned in documents of the XVIII century. Then it was called Lyubetska and stretched from Dytynets Park to Pyatnytsky Field (Red Square). The Statue of Lenin was located in the middle of Myru Avenue, near the Central Post Office and it was toppled on February 21, 2014, as part of the demolitions of the statues of Lenin in Ukraine. During the COVID-19 pandemic, synevo company placed a Lab center in Myru Ave 198-A.

== Sights ==
Along the promenade's length are kiosks that sell newspapers and souvenirs, other kiosks selling flowers, street traders, performers, and pavement cafes and bars. Several notable sights are also located within the promenade, a fountain in Krasna Square and popular meeting point. From its origins from at the entrance of the city of Chernihiv along the Myru Avenue are historic buildings such as Catherine's Church, Dytynets Park, Krasna Square, the Chernihiv City Council, Chernihiv Regional Youth Center (formerly Shchors cinema), Hotel Desna Opera and Drama Theatre, designed by Semyon Fridlin. You can also admire the Chernihiv Oblast Council, Church of the Archangel Michael.

- Catherine's Church
- Dytynets Park
- Chernihiv Philharmony
- Statue to the Chernobyl Disaster
- Krasna Square
- Chernihiv Regional Youth Center
- Chernihiv City Council
- Chernihiv Governorate Zemstvo building
- Hotel Ukraina
- House of the Fire Society
- Cinema Druzhba
- Institute of Physical Therapy
- Chernihiv Oblast Council
- Korolenko Chernihiv Regional Universal Scientific Library
- Church of the Archangel Michael
- Chernihiv Arena

== Transport ==
- Buses 1, 2, 2A, 3, 5, 7, 9, 10, 15, 17, 20, 22, 23, 24, 25, 27, 28, 29, 30, 31, 32, 33, 34, 35, 37, 38, 39, 42,
- Trolleybuses 1, 2, 3, 4, 5, 6, 9, 10
- Minibuses 33

== Buildings ==
In the future, the ZAZ plant and other small industrial enterprises will be opened.

- Bus. № 13-Educational and Scientific Institute of History, Ethnology and Law named after O.M. Lazarevsky; Severyan thought;
- Bus. № 32 - TV channel "Baby";
- Bus. № 33 - Ukraine (hotel, Chernihiv);
- Bus. № 36 - Institute of Physical Therapy. Vorovsky, construction in 1912;
- Bus. № 40 - SSh №1;
- Bus. № 41 - Noble and Peasant Land Bank, now Chernihiv Regional Universal Scientific Library named after VG Korolenko
- Bus. № 44 - Chernihiv City Hospital № 1;
- Bus. № 51 - Druzhba cinema;
- Bus. № 68 - Hradec Králové (hotel);
- Bus. № 74 - Poltoratsky Doctors' House (historical monument);
- Bus. № 100 - Church of the Archangel Michael MP (built in 2011);
- Bus. № 116 - Rashevsky's house (historical monument; actually disappeared);
- Bus. № 137-School-college №11
- Bus. № 207a - SSh №28
- Bus. № 207b - School №33
- Bus. № 211-Municipal special preventive institution "Chernihiv Regional Oncology Center"

== Gallery ==
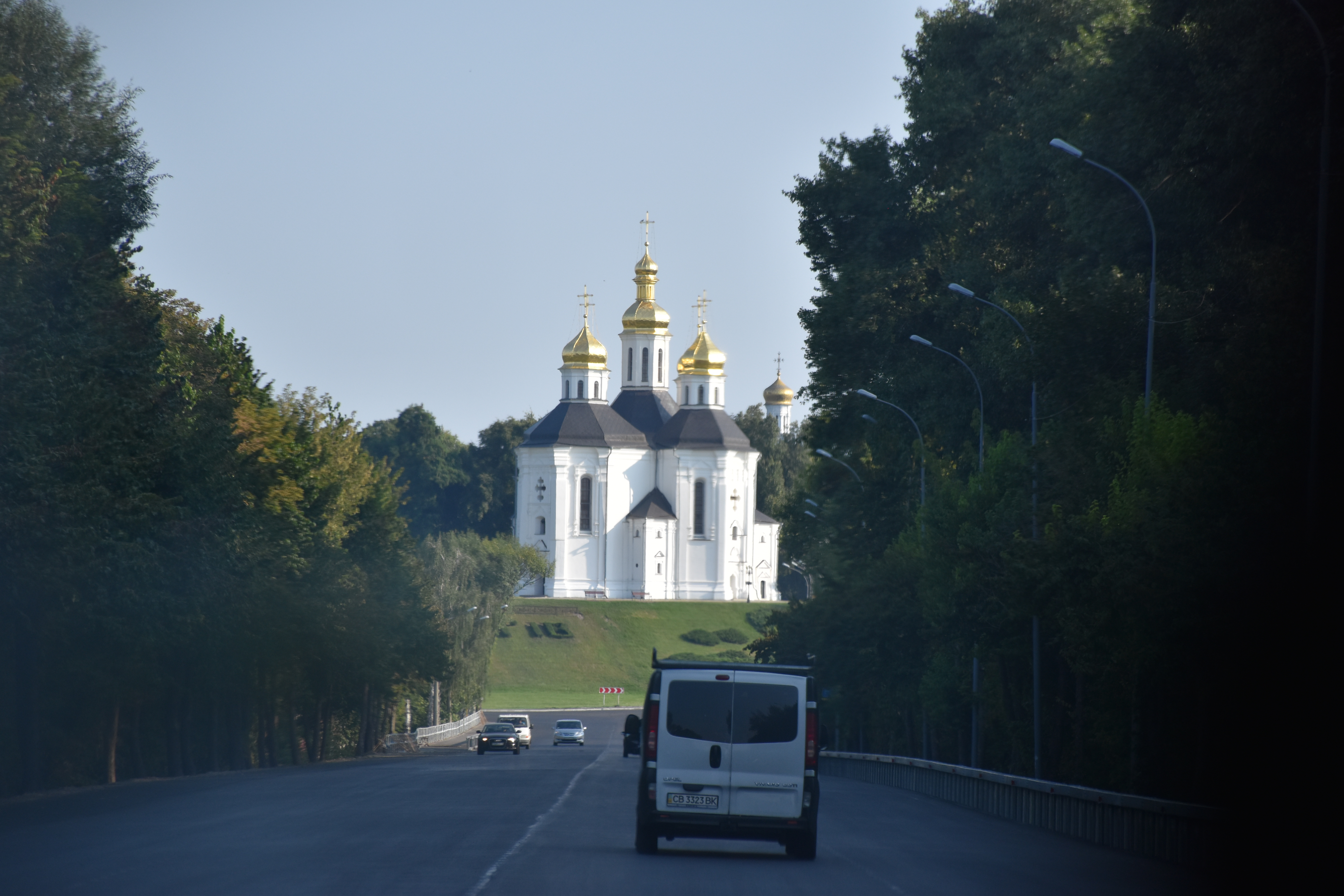
View of the Cathedral at the entrance of Chernihiv

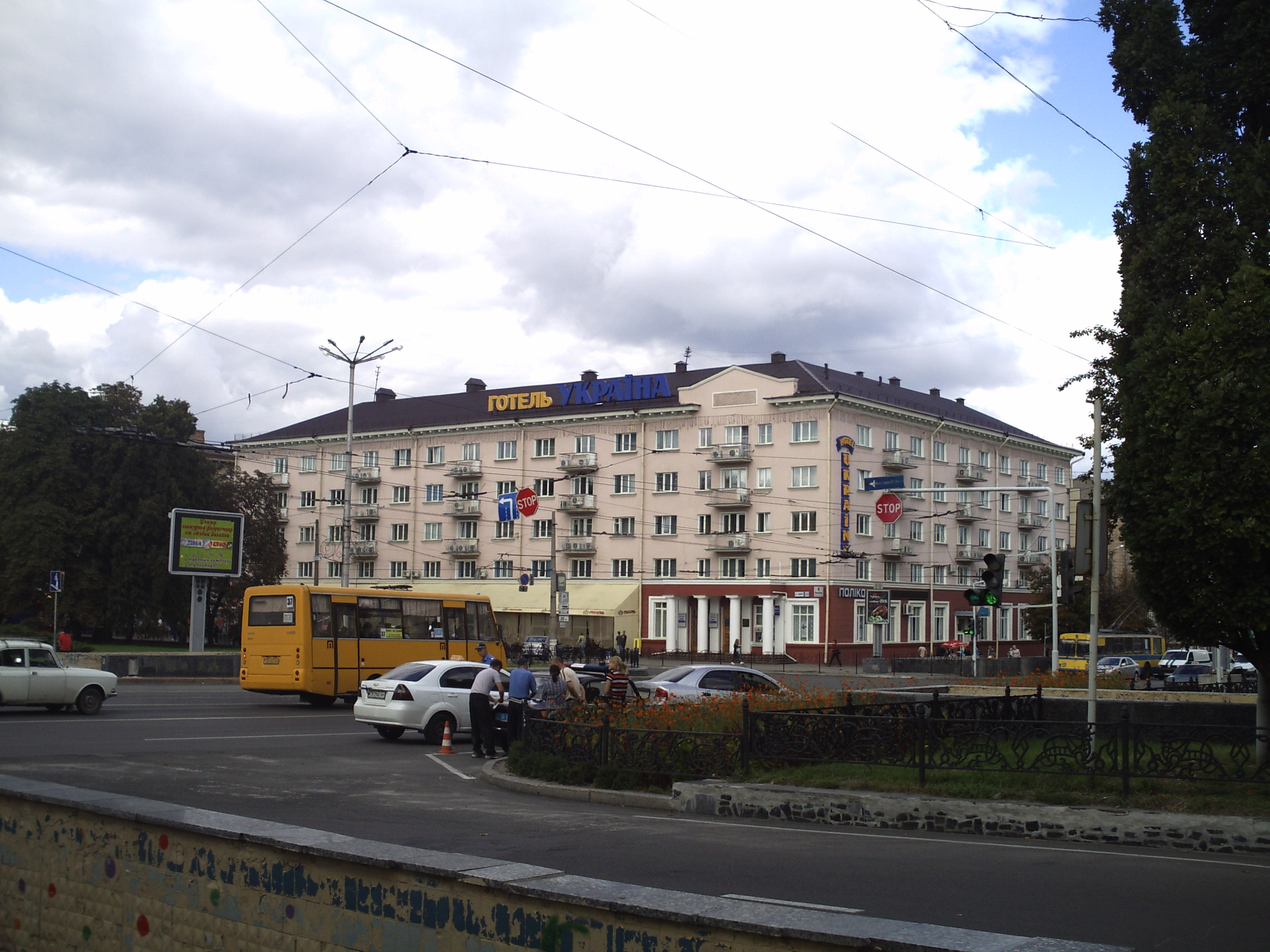
Hotel Ukraine (33 Prospekt Mira)

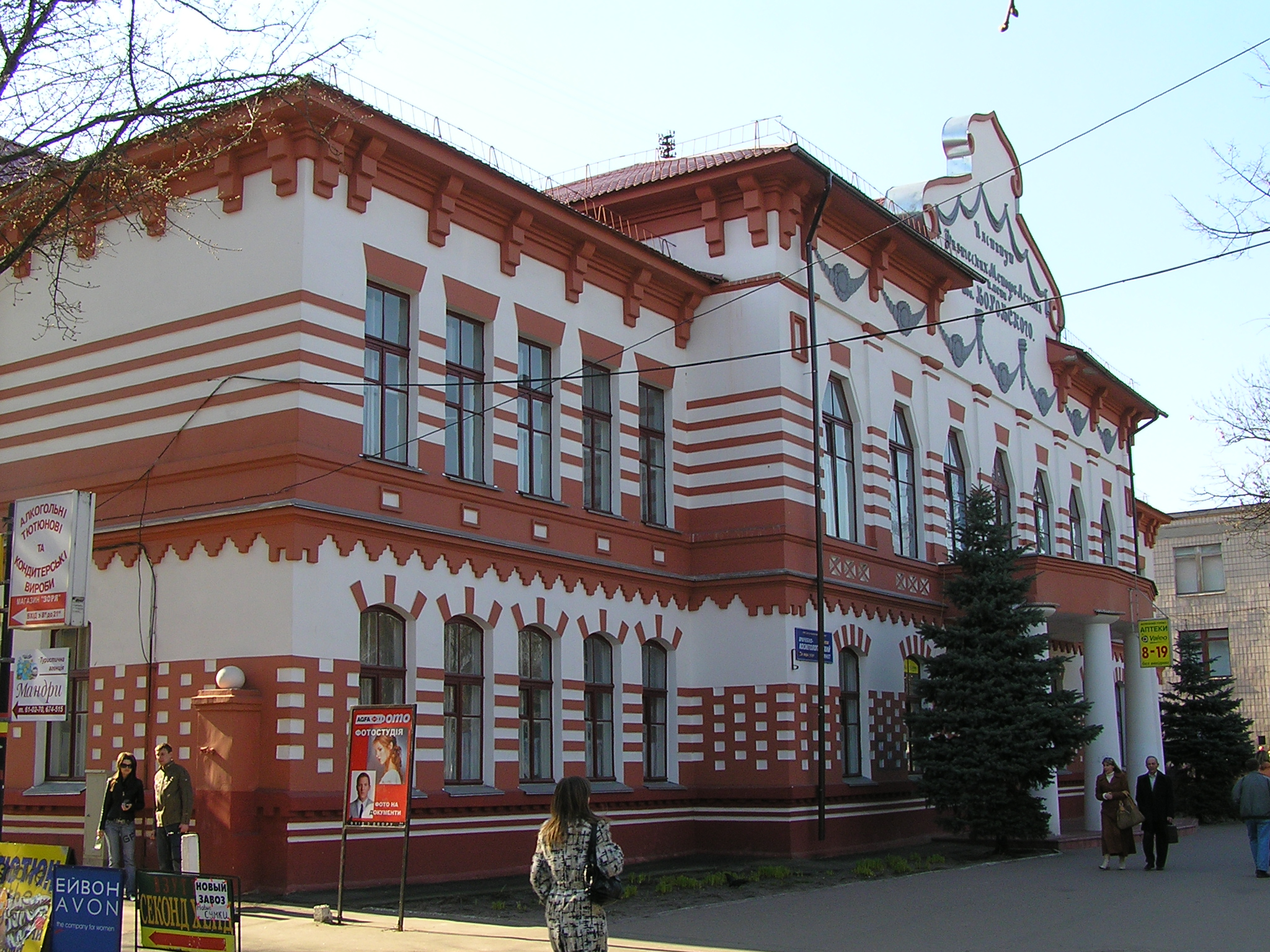
Institute of Physical Therapy. Vorovsky, building 1912 (36 Mira Avenue)

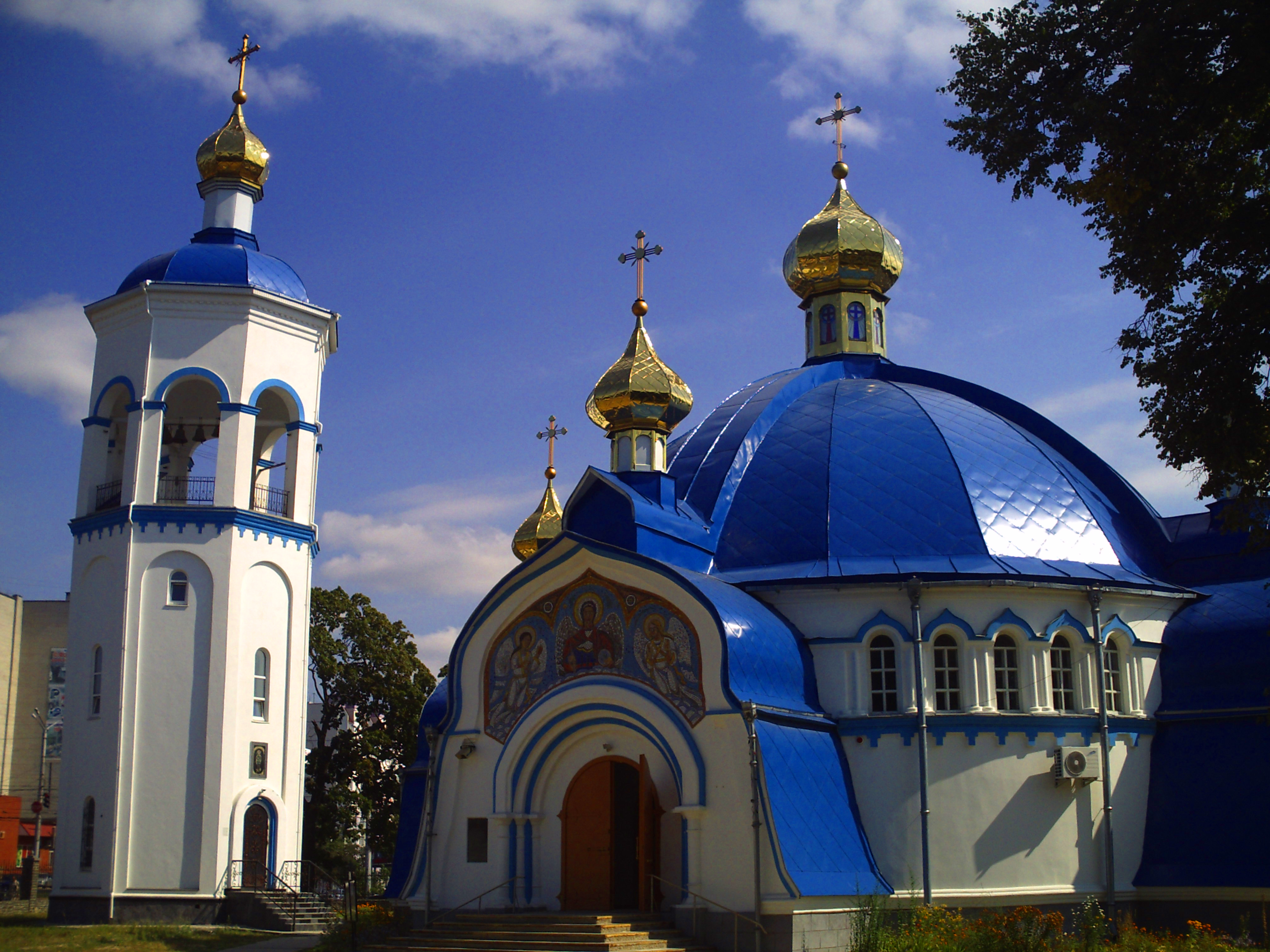
Church of the Archangel Michael

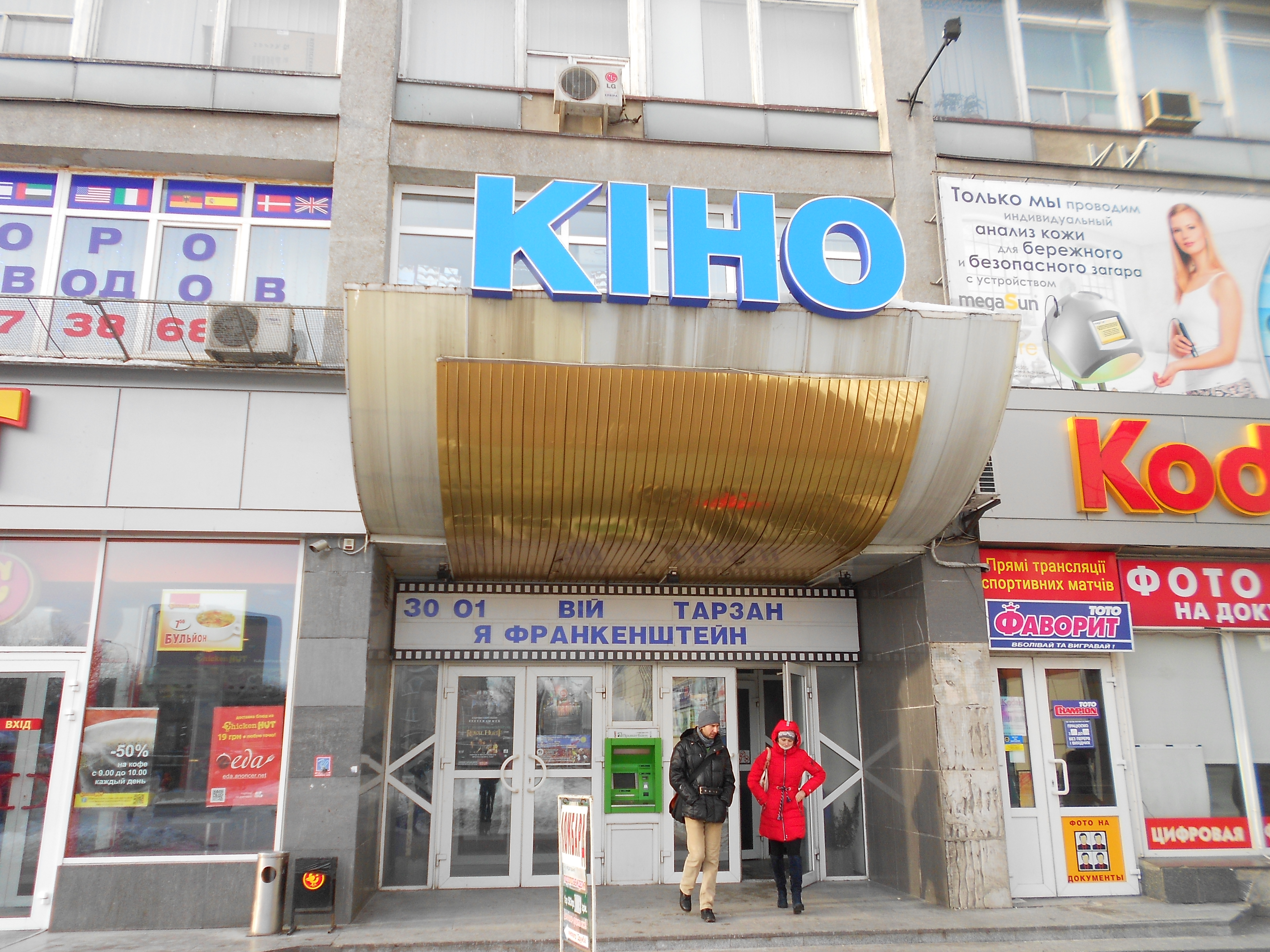

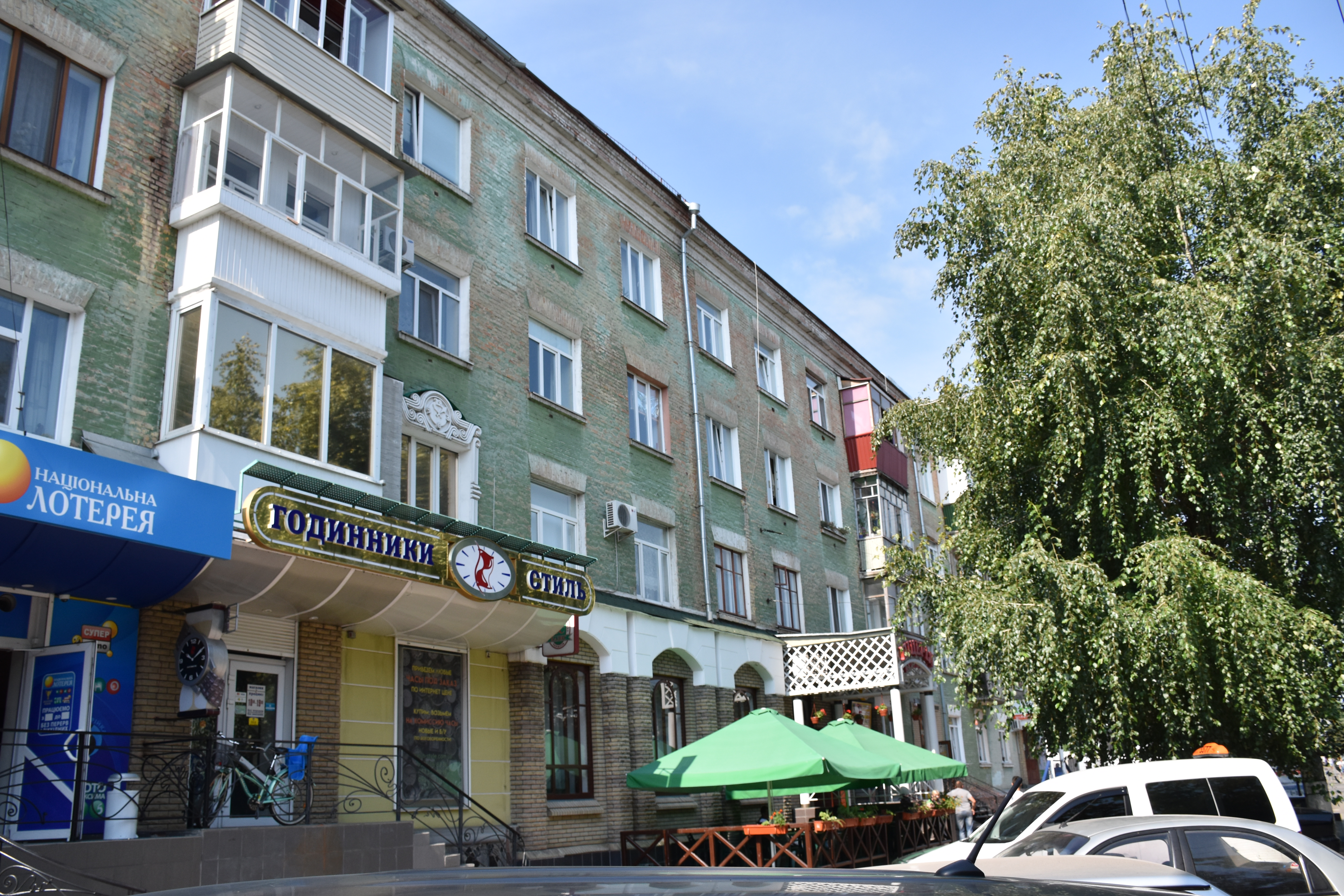

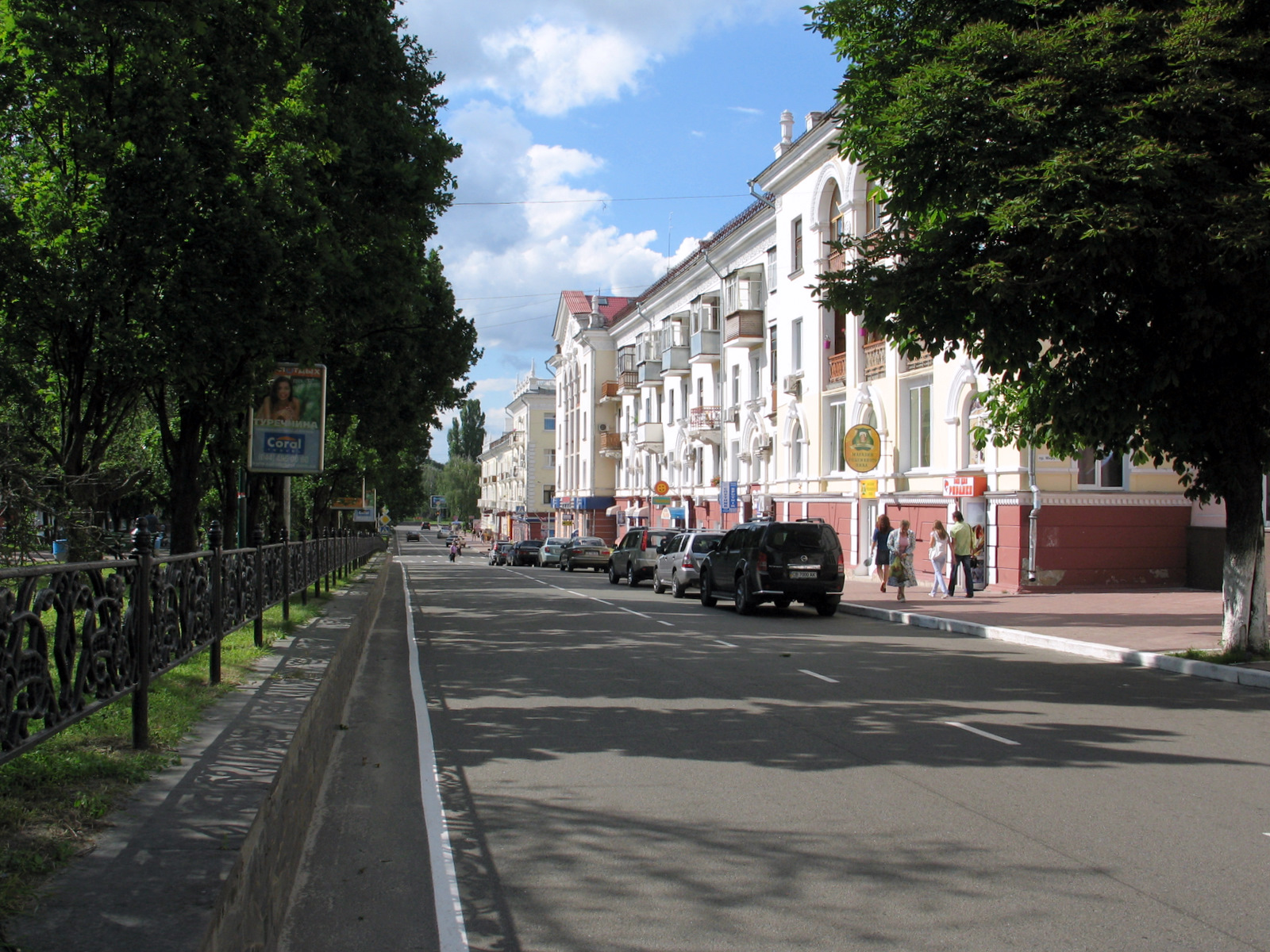

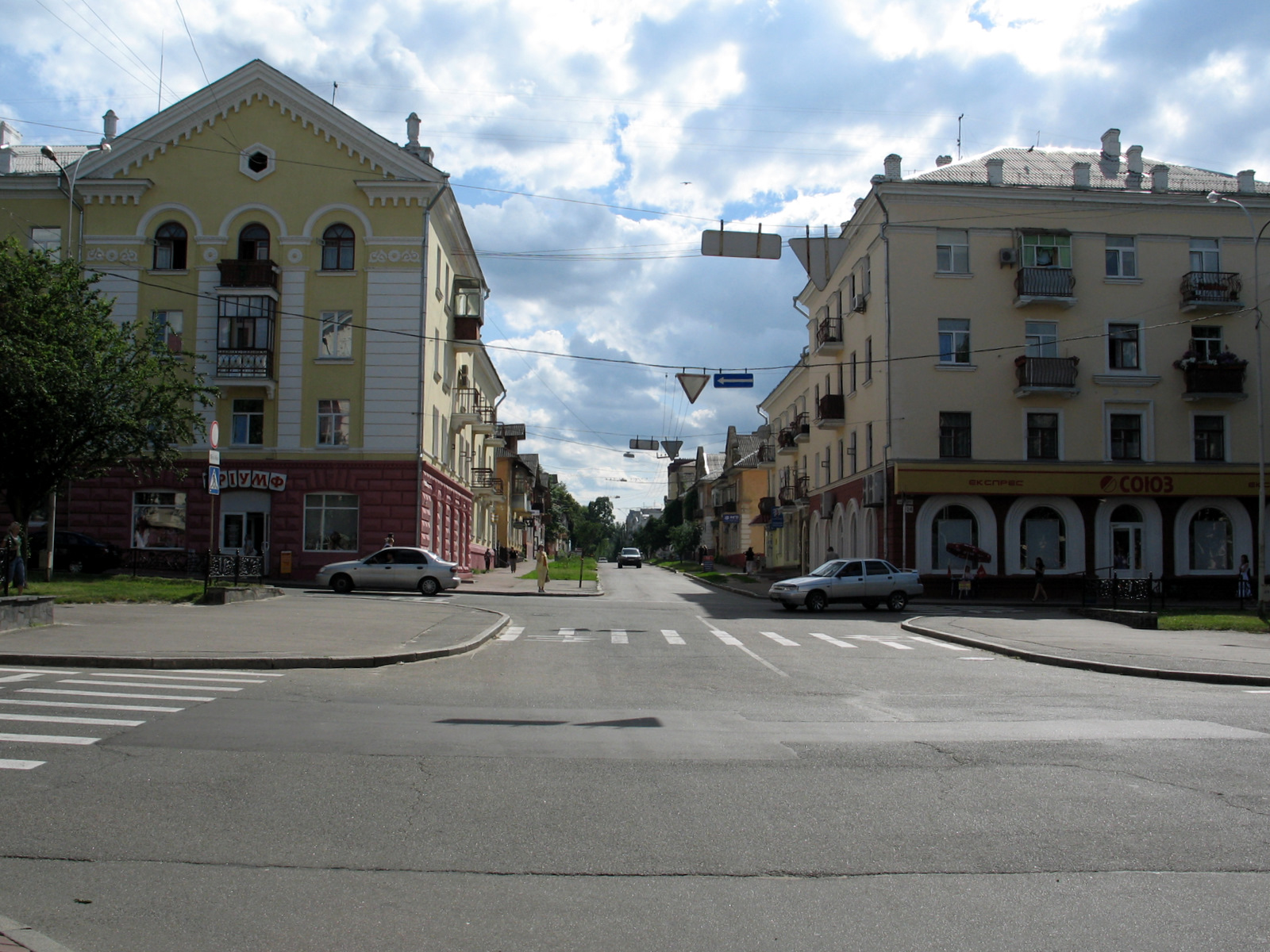

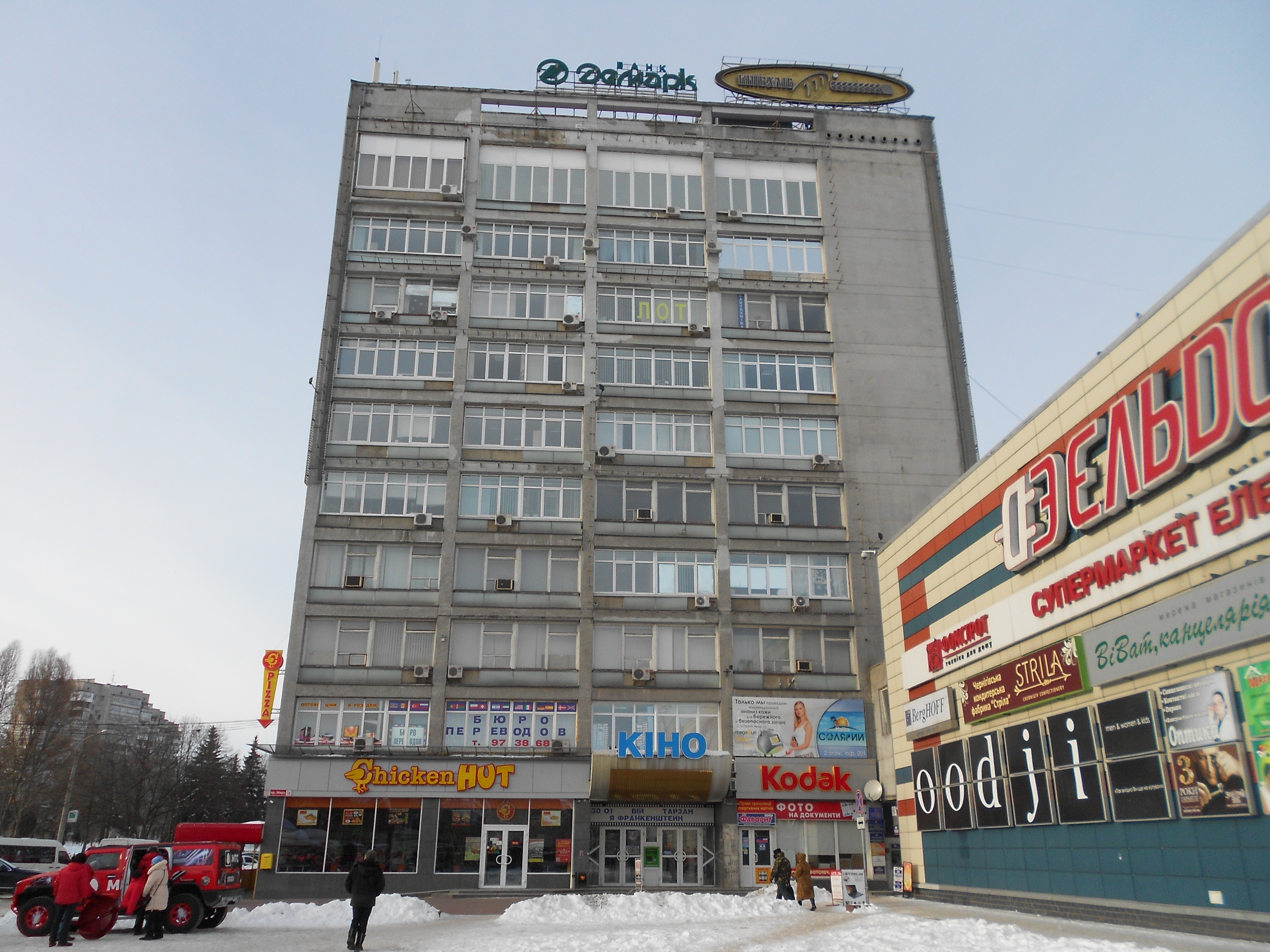
Cinema Druzhba in Chernihiv

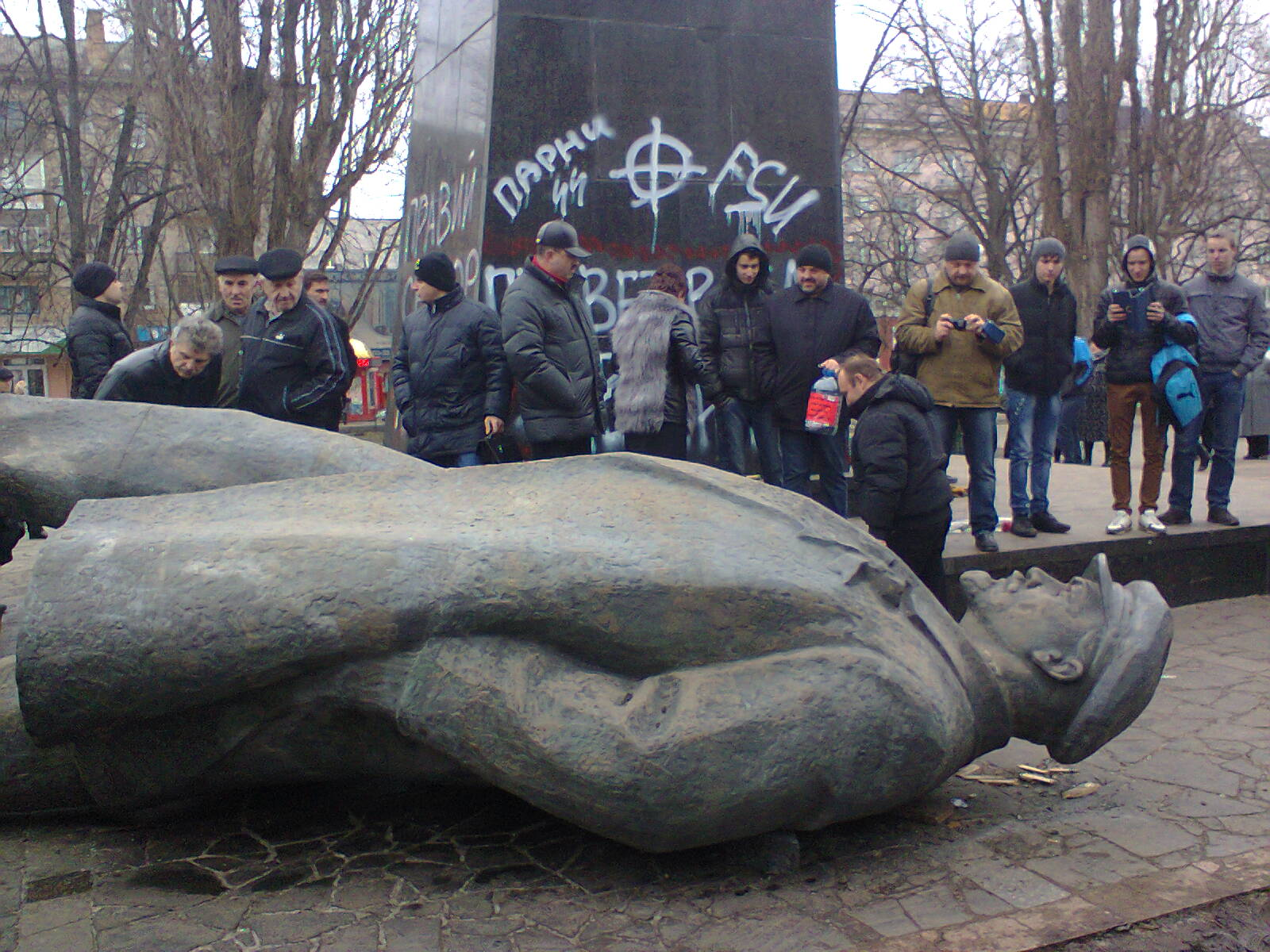
The Statue of Lenin located in the center of Myru Avenue toppled in 2014

== See also ==
- List of streets and squares in Chernihiv
