= Sofia Rusova =

Ukrainian author, women's rights advocate and political activist

- Софія Русова
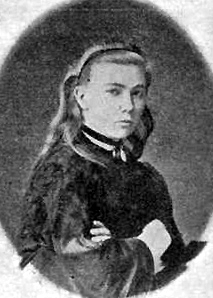
- Born: Софія Федорівна Ліндфорс; Sofia Fedorivna Lindfors; 18 February 1856; Oleshnia, Gorodnyansky Uyezd, Chernigov Governorate, Russian Empire (now Ukraine)
- Died: 5 February 1940 (aged 83); Prague, Protectorate of Bohemia and Moravia
- Spouse: Oleksander Rusov (m. 1874; died 1915)
- Children: 2

Sofia Fedorivna Rusova (née Lindfors; Ukrainian: Софія Федорівна Русова; 18 February 1856 – 5 February 1940) was a Ukrainian educator, writer, women's rights advocate, and political activist. A member of the Central Rada, Rusova was head of the Ministry of Education Department of Preschool and Adult Education. Rusova was a founding member and the first president of the National Council of Ukrainian Women and the All-Ukrainian Teachers' Association.

== Early life ==
Sofia Fedorivna Lindfors was born on 18 February 1856 in the selo of Oleshnia, Gorodnyansky Uyezd (present-day Koriukivka Raion, Ukraine). Her father, Fedir Lindfors, was a retired military officer from a Baltic noble family of Swedish origin, and her mother, Hanna Gervais, was of French descent. The everyday languages in the Lindfors household were Russian and French. Rusova was a child when her ten-year-old sister, Natalia, and six-year-old brother, Volodymyr, died. Her mother contracted tuberculosis and died soon after. Rusova's older sister, Maria, barely a teenager, stepped in to fill the role of mother. The family moved to Kyiv when Rusova was ten years old, and there Rusova completed the Fundukleiev Gymnasium.

== Educator ==
In 1871 Rusova's father died, leaving Rusova, her 27-year-old sister Maria and 31-year-old brother Oleksander orphaned. Soon after, Rusova and her sister Maria moved in together. There were no existing kindergartens in Kyiv, and the sisters set out to study early childhood education and to eventually open a kindergarten. In 1872, they opened Kyiv's first kindergarten. In the following years Sofia engaged in the organization of sunday schools and public readings, created a Ukrainian alphabet book and a schoolbook in geography, served as professor of education at the Froebel Pedagogical Institute in Kyiv and took part in numerous teachers' congresses, speaking in support of the right to receive education in native language.

Rusova is recognized as a prominent pedagogue and an advocate for national education. Despite having no formal higher education, she went on to receive an honorary degree in sociology in Prague and read lectures at the Bestuzhev Courses in Saint Petersburg. In 1910-1914 she published Svitlo - the first Ukrainian-language pedagogical magazine in Dnieper Ukraine.

After being forced to emigrate, Rusova headed the pedagogical chair of the Drahomanov Higher Pedagogical Institute in Prague. In 1927 and 1930 she published treatises on preschool and social education.

== Political activist ==
By the 1800s, the political and military institutions of Ukraine had been dismantled by the Russian Empire. Ukrainians were labeled “Little Russians” and treated as subordinates. Ukraine was reduced to provincial status. By the late 1800s the Russian Empire was promoting a fierce anti-Ukrainian sentiment. The imperial regime under Tsar Alexander II issued the Ems Ukaz, which outlawed the use of the Ukrainian language in print. The Ukrainian intelligentsia was determined to publish Taras Shevchenko's complete Kobzar in two volumes, including the parts of the text that had been censored and were virtually unknown in Ukraine. Rusova and her husband spent time in Prague preparing the text for publication. Fedir Vovk, an anthropologist and archeologist, furnished Shevchenko's manuscripts that he had purchased from Shevchenko's brothers with money donated by wealthy Ukrainians. At great personal risk, the couple brought the complete, published Kobzar back to Ukraine. Their success was achieved at cost of a personal tragedy, as during their stay in Prague, Rusovs lost their three-month old daughter Liudmyla.

The Rusov couple was exiled to Saint Petersburg more than once for their civic and political activity. Rusova was arrested and imprisoned on several occasions for her "revolutionary" views and writing. As the family's house would be repeatedly searched by the police, Sofia would resort to hiding confidential documents in her daughter's diapers. Rusova's youngest son Yuriy was born when his mother stayed under arrest on accusation of smuggling of prohibited books from Galicia for the Tarasivtsi Brotherhood. In 1915 Sofia became a widow after her husband Oleksandr fell ill and died during evacuation from Kyiv to Saratov.

In 1917 Rusova became a member of the Central Council of Ukraine, one of 11 women to sit in that organ. She served in the Department of Preschool and Adult Education in the Ministry of Education and was responsible for the Derussification of schools and preparatio of new schoolbooks. Between March and September 1917 Rusova supervised the establishment of 66 schools and 21 gymnasiums where education was performed in Ukrainian. Afterwards she lectured at the Kamyanets-Podilsky National University. Rusova was a founding member and first president of the National Council of Ukrainian Women. She represented Ukrainian women at the international convention in The Hague (1922), where she informed the participants about the ongoing famine in Ukraine, and in Rome (1923). She became an honorary member of the Ukrainian Women's Union in Galicia and took part in a Ukrainian women's society in Bukovina. Rusova condemned the discrimination of Ukrainians in Second Polish Republic and issued an appeal to the League of Nations, protesting against the classification of Ukrainian migrants as "Poles" or "Russians". In 1933 she issued a message to the worldwide community, condemning Soviet policies during the Holodomor. In 1934 Rusova participated in the Ukrainian Women's Congress in Stanislaviv.

== Personal life ==
In August 1874, Rusova married Oleksander Rusov (1847–1915), a statistician and folklorist. On Rusov's advice Sofia visited her native village in order to collect Ukrainian folk songs. The couple's wedding was attended by Mykhailo Drahomanov and Mykola Lysenko, who wrote a rhapsody for the bride. Oleksandr was a convinced narodnik, and after their marriage he and Sofia engaged in civic, intellectual and revolutionary activities, travelling around the country and discussing the development of the national movement with fellow supporters of Ukrainian national cause.

The couple had two children Mykhailo Rusov (1876–1909), a ethnographer and member of the Revolutionary Ukrainian Party, and Yurii Rusov (1898–1961), a biologist.

== Legacy ==
Rusova promoted daycare, continuing education, human rights, and the political organization of the peasants. She escaped from Soviet Ukraine in 1922 and settled in Prague, where she taught at the Ukrainian Higher Pedagogical Institute between 1924 and 1939. She died in Prague at the age of 84 and was buried at the Olsanske Cemetery.

In 2016 a commemorative coin was minted in Ukraine in honor of the 160th anniversary of Rusova's birth. A monument was installed on the school grounds in the town of Ripky. The Sofia Rusova School in Oleshnia, where Rusova was born, houses a modest museum and hosts scholarly workshops dedicated to Rusova.

In June 2023, the Vladimir Korolenko Rusov Chernihiv Regional Universal Scientific Library was renamed the Sofia and Oleksandr Rusov Chernihiv Regional Universal Scientific Library.
