= Wedding Palace =

Wedding Palace may refer to:

- Gulustan Palace, formerly known as Gulustan Wedding Palace Complex, Azerbaijan
- Wedding Palace (Almaty), Dagestan
- Wedding Palace (Ashgabat), Turkmenistan
- Wedding Palace (Chernihiv), Ukraine
- Wedding Palace (Tbilisi), Georgia
