= Central Bus Station (Chernihiv) =

Bus station in Ukraine

Chernihiv Central Bus Station Автовокзал Чернигов–1
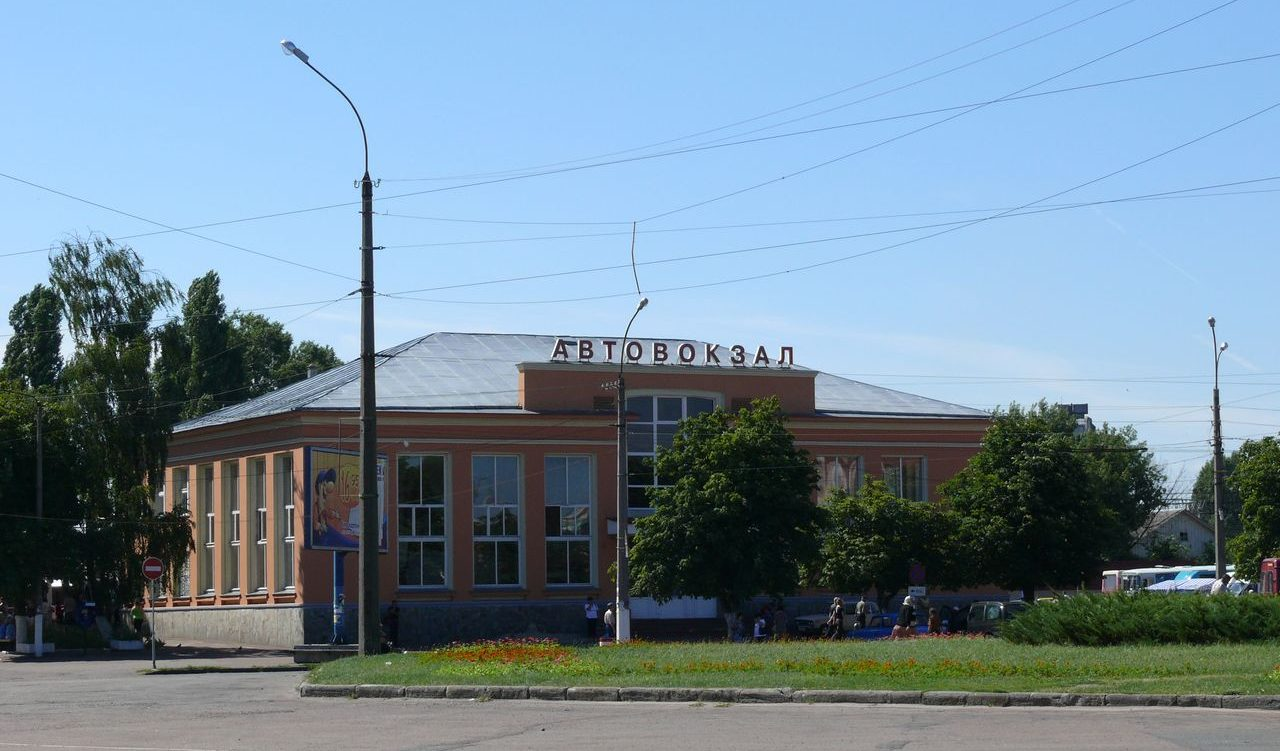
- Chernihiv Central Bus Station

General information
- Location: Station Square; Chernihiv, Ukraine
- Coordinates: 51°30′4″N 31°17′4″E
- System: Bus interchange

Other information
- Website: opaschernigiv.com.ua

History
- Opened: 1964
Location

The Chernihiv Bus Station (Ukrainian: Автовокзал "Чернигов) is located just beside the Chernihiv–Ovruch railway in the Station Square just few metres from the Victory Square.

== Description ==
The bus station was put into operation in 1964. The central bus station "Chernihiv-1" is located on the forecourt next to the Chernihiv–Ovruch railway in the Station Square just ten minutes by car with Myru Avenue and Krasna Square in Chernihiv.

== Transport connections ==
It carries out international, intercity, suburban passenger transportation. Its proximity to the railway station makes it convenient for long-distance travel. Routes leave daily in the direction of Minsk, Bryansk, Kyiv, Kharkov, Nikolaev, as well as small settlements of the Kharkiv Oblast. The interval between flights to Kyiv is from 25 to 30 minutes. Up to five flights are carried out every day to Korop, Slavutich. Flights to Zhytomyr depart two times a day.

Bus station "Chernihiv №1"

1. A city connected with Kyiv and Gomel by a highway with a dividing strip M 01
2. City connected with Gorodnya highway R 21
3. City connected with Mena and Novgorod-Northern Highway R 20
4. The city connected with Chernobyl by the route P 56

== Station services ==
=== Tickets ===
The Central Bus Station building has seven ticket offices, an information desk, also boxes (both own and third-party) offering tickets for bus, Ukrainian national railway and air travel throughout Ukraine and abroad. Booking and electronic ticket services are available, also left-luggage offices, and a buffet.

=== Passenger accommodation ===
The station sells tickets for buses and fixed-route taxis and provides the availability of seats and the cost of the ticket at the box office in the station or by phone. Bus timetables are available. The station features most kinds of passenger services, including toilets, large waiting hall, several cafes and a barber shop. However, the main station building is open from 05:30 to 24:00 (local time).

== See also ==
- List of trolleybus systems in Ukraine

== Gallery ==
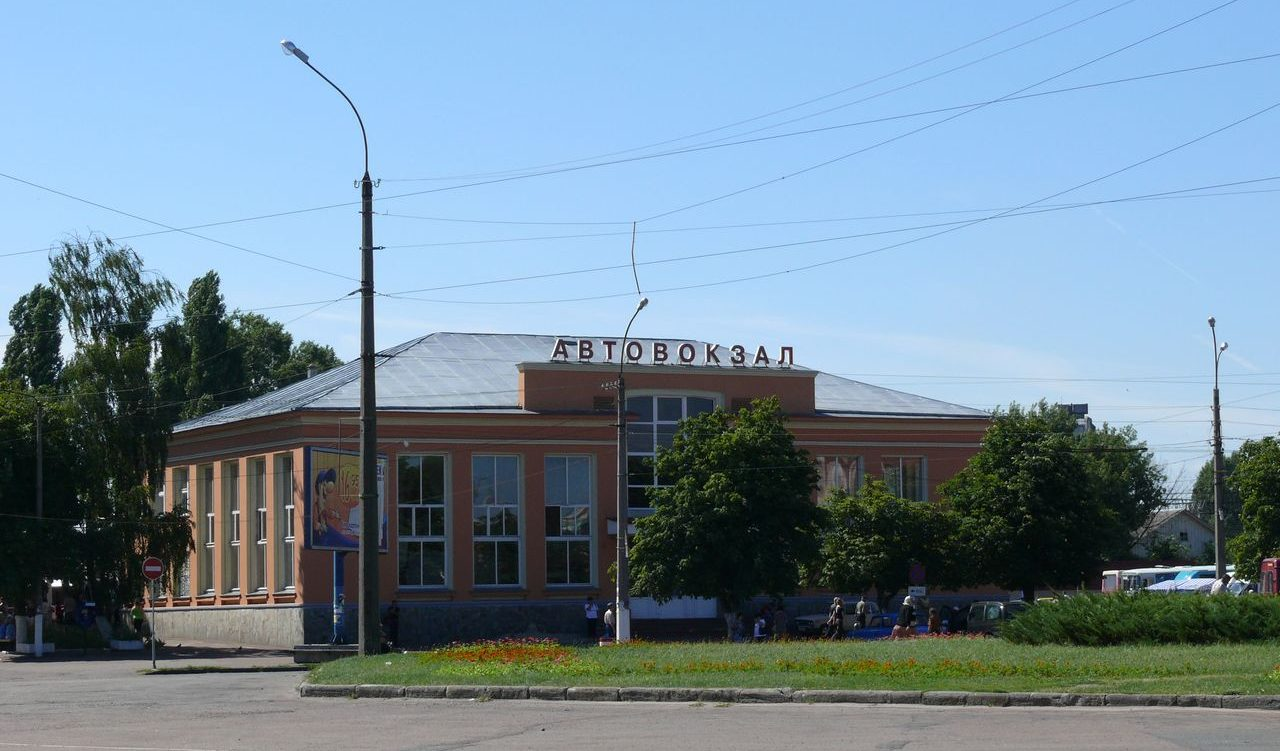
View of the Central Bus Station

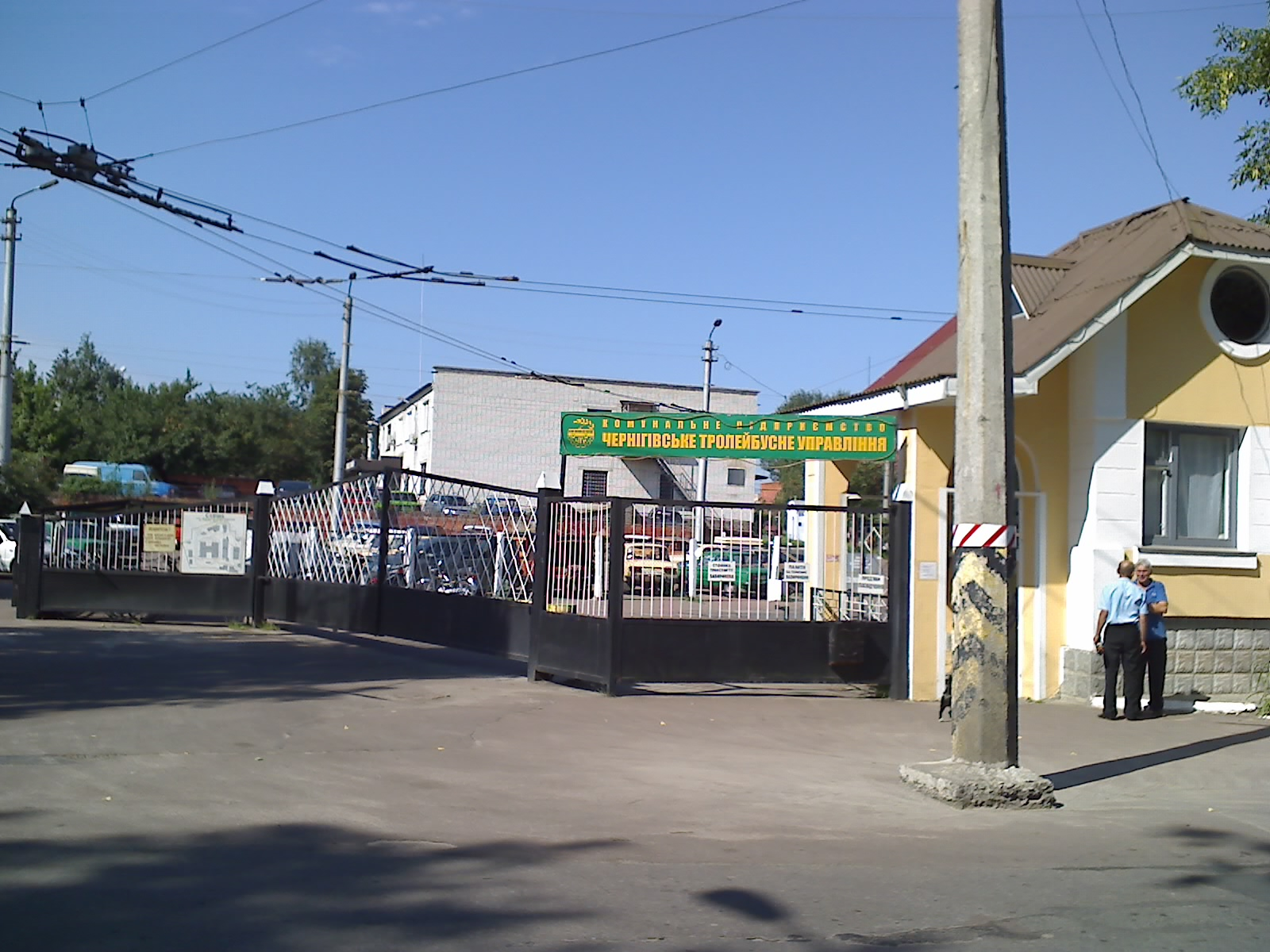
Trolleybus depot in Chernihiv

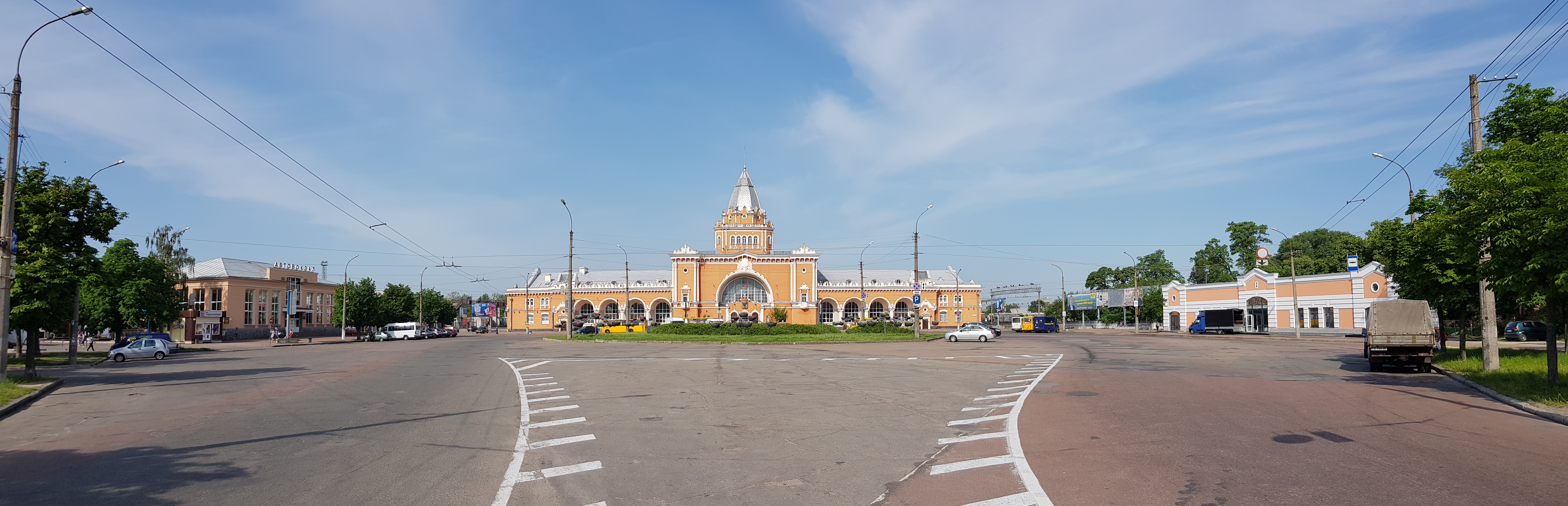
View of the Central Bus Station and the Station Square
