= Peoples' Friendship Square =

Square in Chernihiv, Ukraine

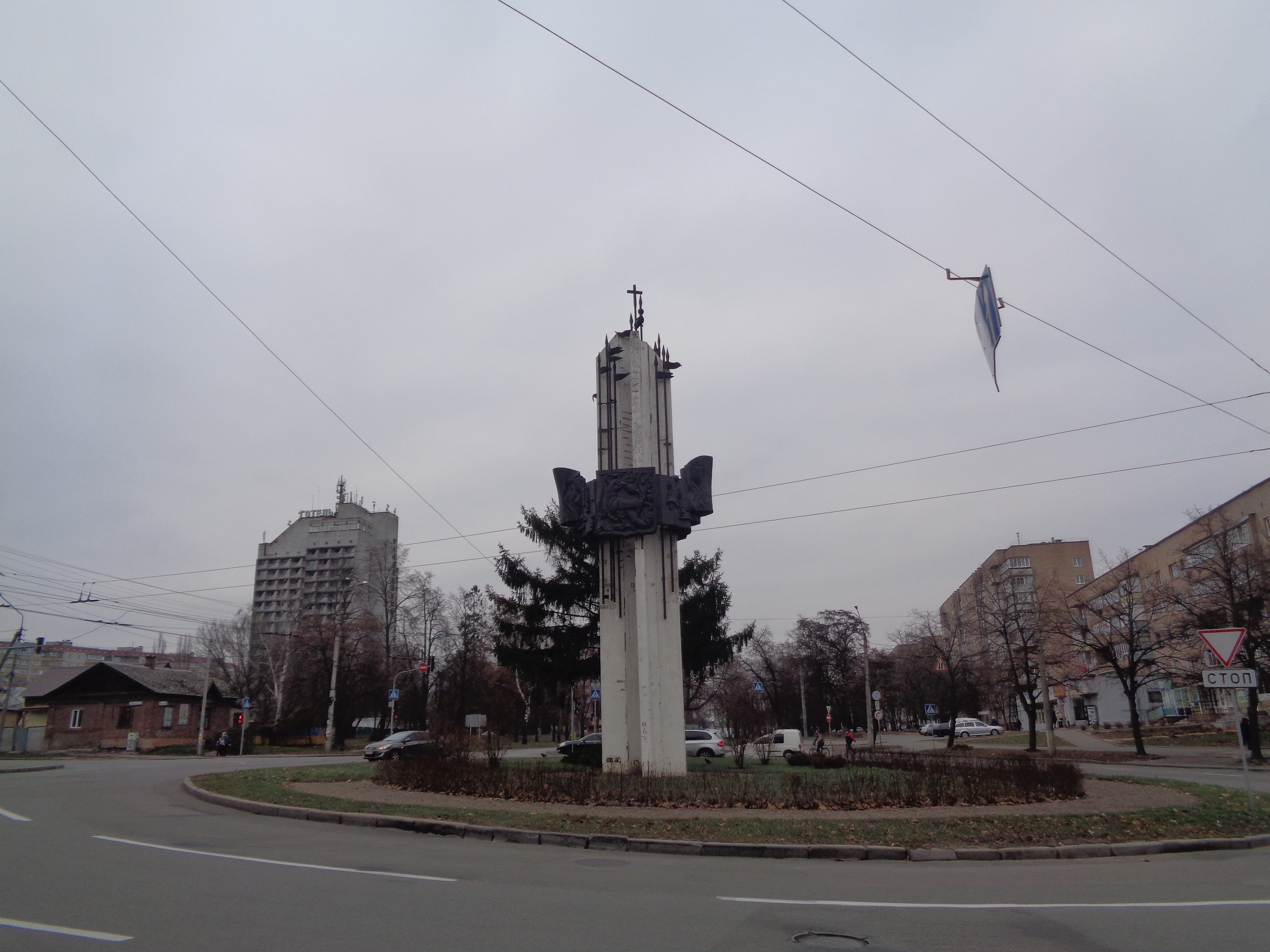
- Interactive map of Peoples' Friendship Square
- Native name: Площа Перемоги (Ukrainian)
- Former name: Peoples' Friendship Square
- Type: Square
- Location: Chernihiv, Ukraine
- Coordinates: 51°30′4″N 31°17′4″E

Peoples' Friendship Square or Droozhby Narodiv Square (Ukrainian: Площадь Дружбы Народов) is a square in the Desnianskyi district of Chernihiv at the intersection of Myru Avenue, Chernihiv, Sofia Rusova and Vyacheslav Chernovol streets.

== Description ==
Traffic is partially regulated by traffic lights. The Peoples' Friendship Stele is located on the square. On both sides of Mira Avenue there is a multi-storey residential building, the north-western corner of Myru Avenue and Vyacheslav Chernovol Street and the south-eastern corner of Myru Avenue and Sofia Rusova Street are occupied by manor buildings. To the south of the square is the boulevard on Mira Avenue. There is a turn for trolleybus routes in the square, which is not currently used for existing routes.

== History ==
The square arose as a result of the reconstruction and new residential development of Lenin Street (now Mira Avenue). In 1982 it was named in honor of the 60th anniversary of the formation of the USSR. A column with the image of the Emblem of the USSR and the flags of the union republics was installed in the center; now coats of arms and flags are replaced by symbols of the city of Chernihiv. In 1982, 14-storey houses were built on Lenin Street, in particular around the new Peoples' Friendship Square, by the Chernigovgorstroy plant.

== See also ==
- List of streets and squares in Chernihiv

== Gallery ==
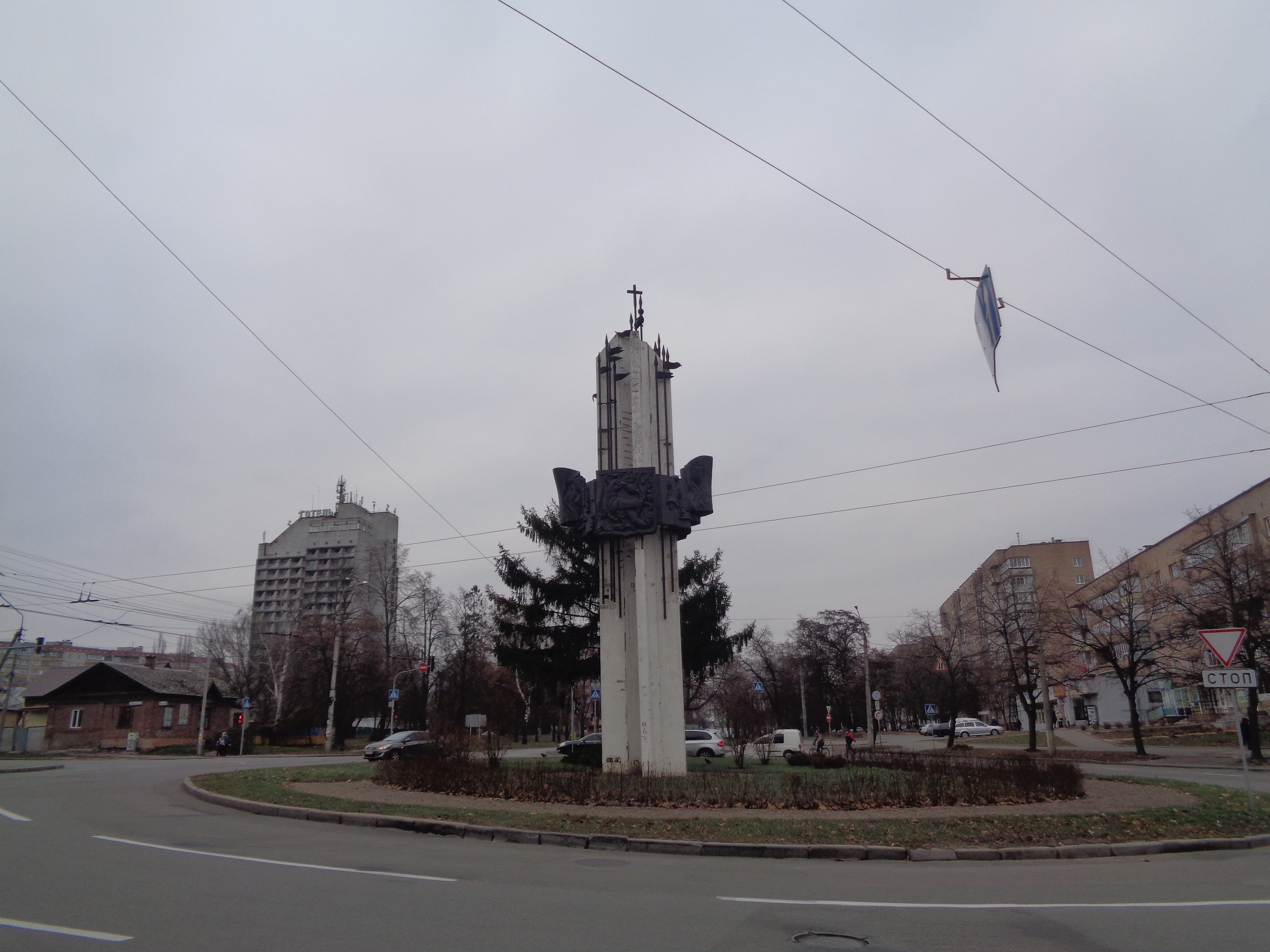
