= Cathedral Square, Chernihiv =

Square in Chernihiv, Ukraine

Cathedral Square
- Interactive map of Cathedral Square
- Native name: Соборная площадь (Ukrainian)
- Former name: Cathedral Square
- Type: Square
- Location: Chernihiv, Chernihiv Oblast Ukraine
- Coordinates: 51°29′13″N 31°18′19″E

Construction
- Construction start: 19th century

Cathedral Square (Ukrainian: Соборная площадь) a historical square in the Desnyansky district of Chernihiv, on the territory of Detinets, as part of the park of culture and recreation named after M. M. Kotsiubinsky. Since 1920 - the area of the Dictatorship of the Proletariat.

== Description ==
Cathedral Square was located on the territory of Dytynets Park in Chernihiv to the west of the Transfiguration Cathedral and Saints Borys and Hlib Cathedral. Now the area is part of the park of culture and recreation named after M. M. Kotsyubinsky.

Historical monuments of local importance: A memorial sign on the site of the house of the Chernigov Local Party Committee, from where in August 1941 a concentrated group of 186 people entered the area, which became the core of the regional partisan formation (1941, a memorial sign 1966) - recommended for deregistration Bratsk grave of Soviet warriors (Brother's grave Chervonoarmіjtsіv Bogunskoye Regiment Divіzії, Yaki, zaginulya, at delegated m. Chernigov Vіd Petlyurivtsіv 12.01.1919 R.A. Tu 11 Radyantsky, Yaki, Yaki attacked at a degraded m. Chernigov at Veresnі 1943 p. ) (1919 and 1943, commemorative badge 1948)

== History ==
Cathedral Square - in honor of the Spaso-Preobrazhensky and Borisoglebsky Cathedrals - has been known since the beginning of the 19th century. It was a place of solemn ceremonies. A monument to Alexander II was erected.

In 1920, Cathedral Square was renamed the Square of the Dictatorship of the Proletariat (also known as the Square of the Proletarian Dictatorship) - in honor of the form of political power of the Dictatorship of the Proletariat. On it, in front of the house of the former noble boarding house, where the executive committee of the city council and the city committee of the CP (b) U were located, rallies, demonstrations and sports holidays were held. In 1921, a bust of V. I. Lenin (sculptor G. V. Neroda) was erected on the square on the pedestal of the dismantled monument to Alexander II, over time it was replaced by a full-length sculpture of V. I. Lenin. A memorial sign was erected on the mass grave during the Civil War. After 1932, the square was planted with trees and ceased to exist.

During the Great Patriotic War, the buildings of the square, including the executive committee of the city council and the city committee of the CP (b) U, were destroyed by Nazi aircraft. The buildings were not restored, they were dismantled. From this building in August 1941, 186 townspeople advanced to the forests of the Kholminsky district, who became part of the Chernihiv partisan formation. At this place in 1977 a memorial sign was erected (sculptor V. Vorontsova).

== See also ==
- List of streets and squares in Chernihiv
