= Station Square (Chernihiv) =

Square in Chernihiv, Ukraine

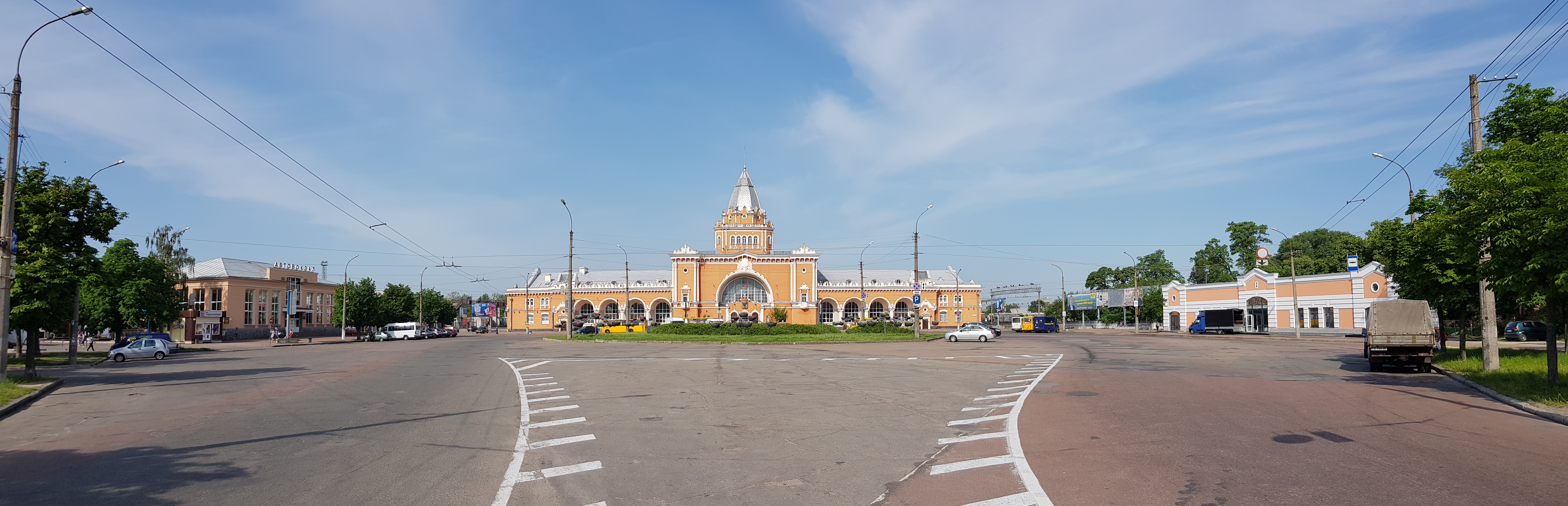
- Interactive map of Station Square
- Native name: Вокзальная площадь (Ukrainian)
- Former name: Station Square
- Type: Square
- Addresses: Vokzalna Sq. 24
- Location: Chernihiv, Chernihiv Oblast Ukraine

Vokzalna Square (Ukrainian: Вокзальная площа) is a square in the Novozavodskyi district of Chernihiv near the Chernihiv–Ovruch railway, the beginning of Peremohy Avenue. Privokzalna Street joins in the north.

== History ==
It was planned in the 1960s on the site of a former park. Reconstruction of the area is planned.

== Description ==
Traffic is not regulated by traffic lights. The central part of the square is occupied by a round flower bed. Adjacent to the railway station and bus station №1, grocery store.

The composition of the square is completed by the building of the railway station (1948) - a monument of architecture of local significance. A memorial plaque in honor of Chernihiv underground heroes (1941-1945, 2001) is attached to the station building.

The area is surrounded by non-residential buildings, in the north there is a manor house (Privokzalnaya Street).

== Transport ==
trolleybus routes № 1, 3, 5 stop Railway station on Pobeda Avenue.

== See also ==
- List of streets and squares in Chernihiv
- Chernihiv–Ovruch railway
- Central Bus Station
