= List of streets and squares in Chernihiv =

This List of streets and squares in Chernihiv

== Squares in Chernihiv ==
- Krasna Square
- Victory Square, Chernihiv
- Peoples' Friendship Square
- Bohdan Khmelnytsky Square
- Popudrenka Garden Square
- Heroes of Stalingrad Square
- Five Corners Square
- Aviators Square
- Alexander Square
- Station Square
- Cathedral Square

== Streets in Chernihiv ==
- Myru Avenue
- Remeslennaya Streets
- Pyrohova Street
- Victory Avenue
- Lyubetska Street
- Street Shevchenko
- Vsikhsviatska Street
- Hetmana Polubotka Street
- Rokossovsky Street
- Kotsiubynskoho Street
- vulytsia Zhabynskoho
- Ivan Mazepa Street
- Pobedy Avenue
- Novozavodsky
- Honcha vulytsia
- Peremohy Avenue
- Kitseva Street
- Nosivka
- Kotsiubynskoho Street
- Polubotka Street
- Shevchenko Street
- Pyatnitskaya Street
- Malinovsky Street
- Kyivska Street
- Remisnycha St
- Vyacheslav Chornovola Street
- Independence Street
