= Wedding Palace, Chernihiv =

Wedding Palace
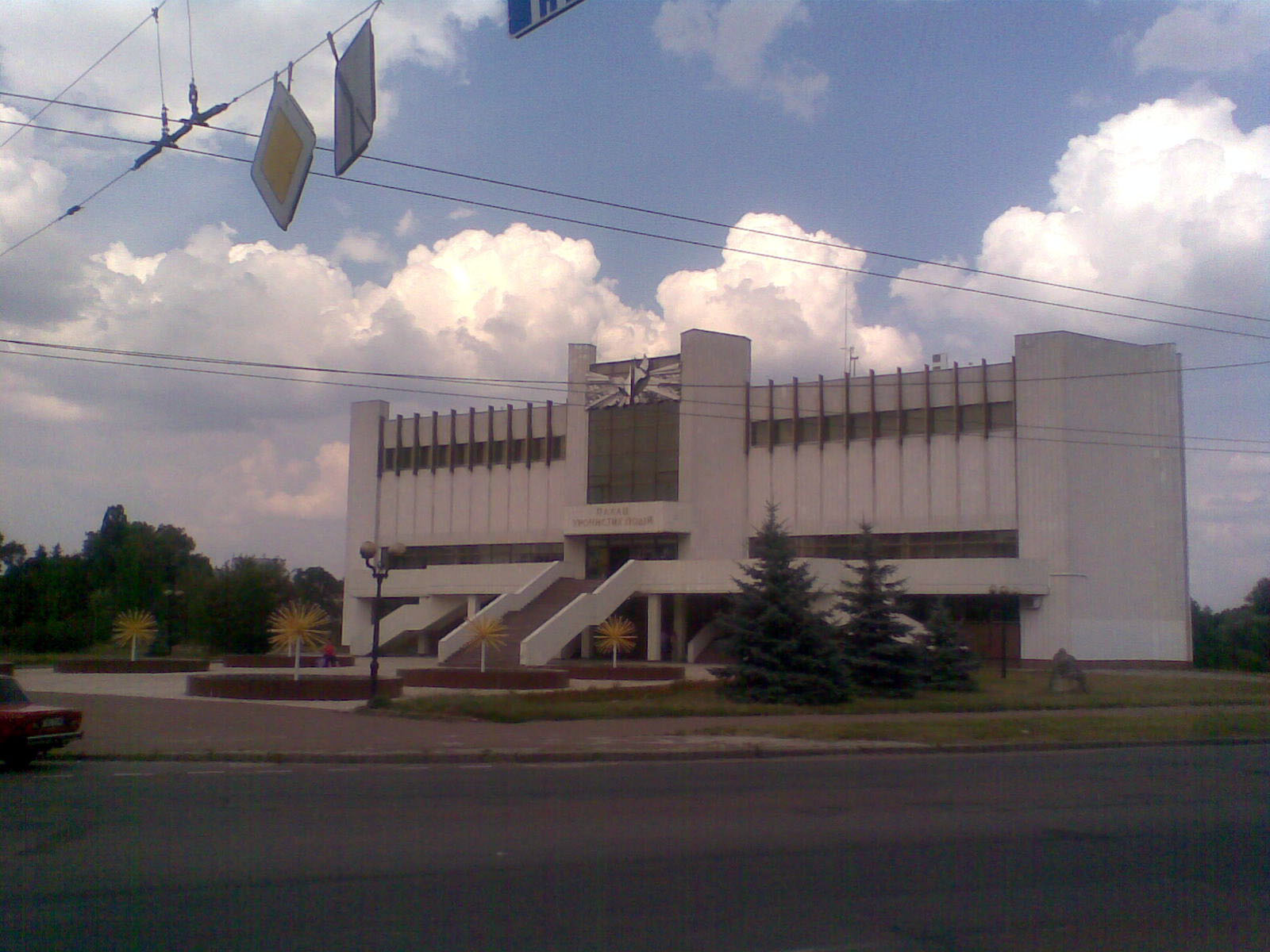
- Interactive map of the Wedding Palace area

General information
- Architectural style: Modernist, Soviet architecture, former USSR
- Location: Pushkina Street, 15, Chernihiv, Ukraine
- Coordinates: 51°29′44″N 31°18′33″E
- Inaugurated: 1988

Design and construction
- Architect: Vyacheslav Pavlyukov

Website
- https://www.sumyjust.gov.ua/

Wedding Palace (Civil State Registration Department) is a building completed in 1988 in the style of Modernist, Soviet architecture by the architect Vyacheslav Pavlyukov.

== Description ==
It is located on Pushkina Street, near the Red Bridge, not far from Bohdan Khmelnytsky Square and Krasna Square. There are three floors, on the first floor there are offices of various services, two small rooms and a lecture hall. On the second floor there are two preparation rooms for young people and witnesses, as well as office rooms and on the third floor there are two halls for ceremonies in blue and pink (there is a superstition that the color of the hall affects the gender of the first child, and there should be many children).

== History ==
The Wedding Palace was designed by the architect, Vyacheslav Pavlyukov during the Soviet era; it was inaugurated in 1988. In May 2021, the renovation of the RATSUFOTO building was discussed. The option of holding all wedding ceremonies is not considered in the registry office, but in the city palace of culture. The mayor of Chernihiv Vladyslav Atroshenko stated at a meeting that the renovation depends on the City Council with the project will consist in three-star hotel and conference halls. In 2021 a statistic state that a thousand couples in Chernihiv have already officially confirmed their relationship during the year. From the testimonies of many spouses, recalled that thanks to the modern approach to the registration of civil status acts, the Ministry of Justice creates all the necessary conditions for quick and convenient access to services.

The Palace of Ceremonies in Chernihiv has been included in the book *Ukrainian Modernism*, which is dedicated to modernist architecture and art in Ukraine.

== General Data ==
The Wedding Palace is open Tuesday to Friday from 8am to 12pm and 12:45 to 5–15pm. Saturday the place is open from 8m to 12pm and 12:45 to 4–15pm and on Sunday from 10am until 5pm. On Monday is closed.

== Gallery ==
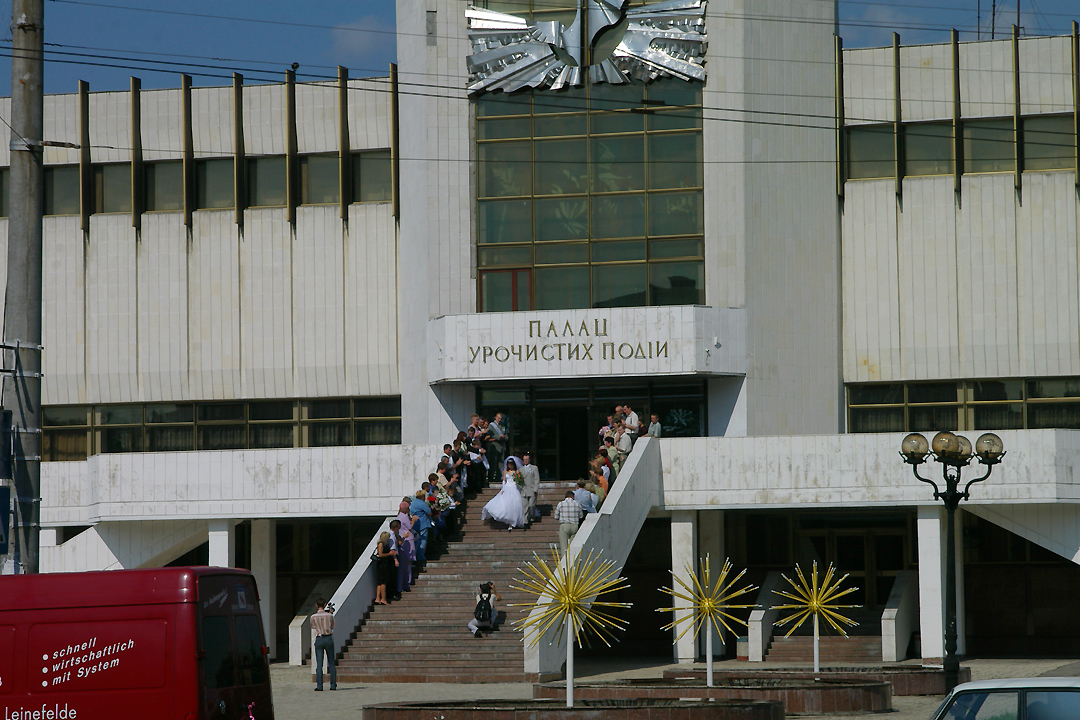
Wedding function on the stairs

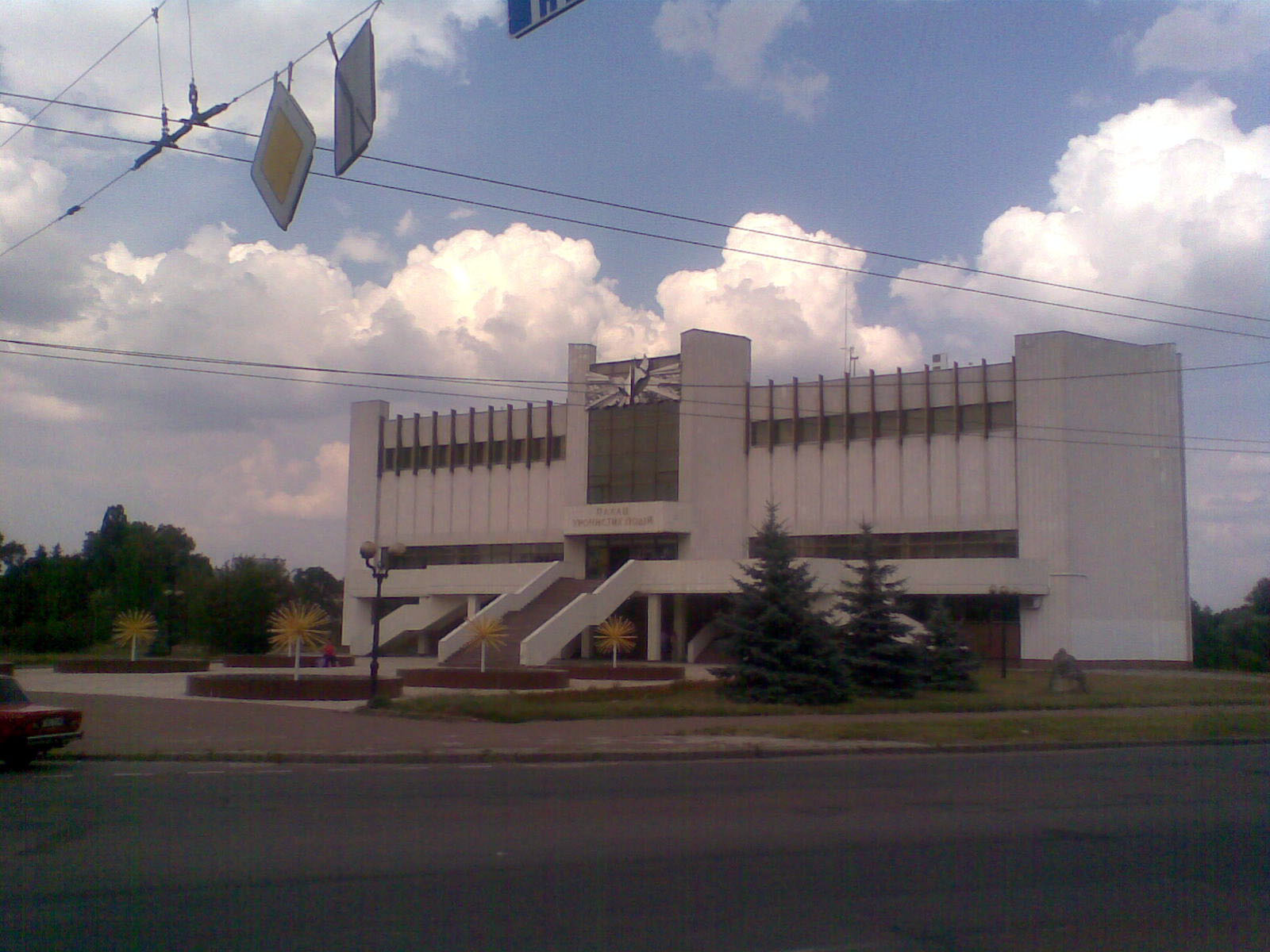
Front view

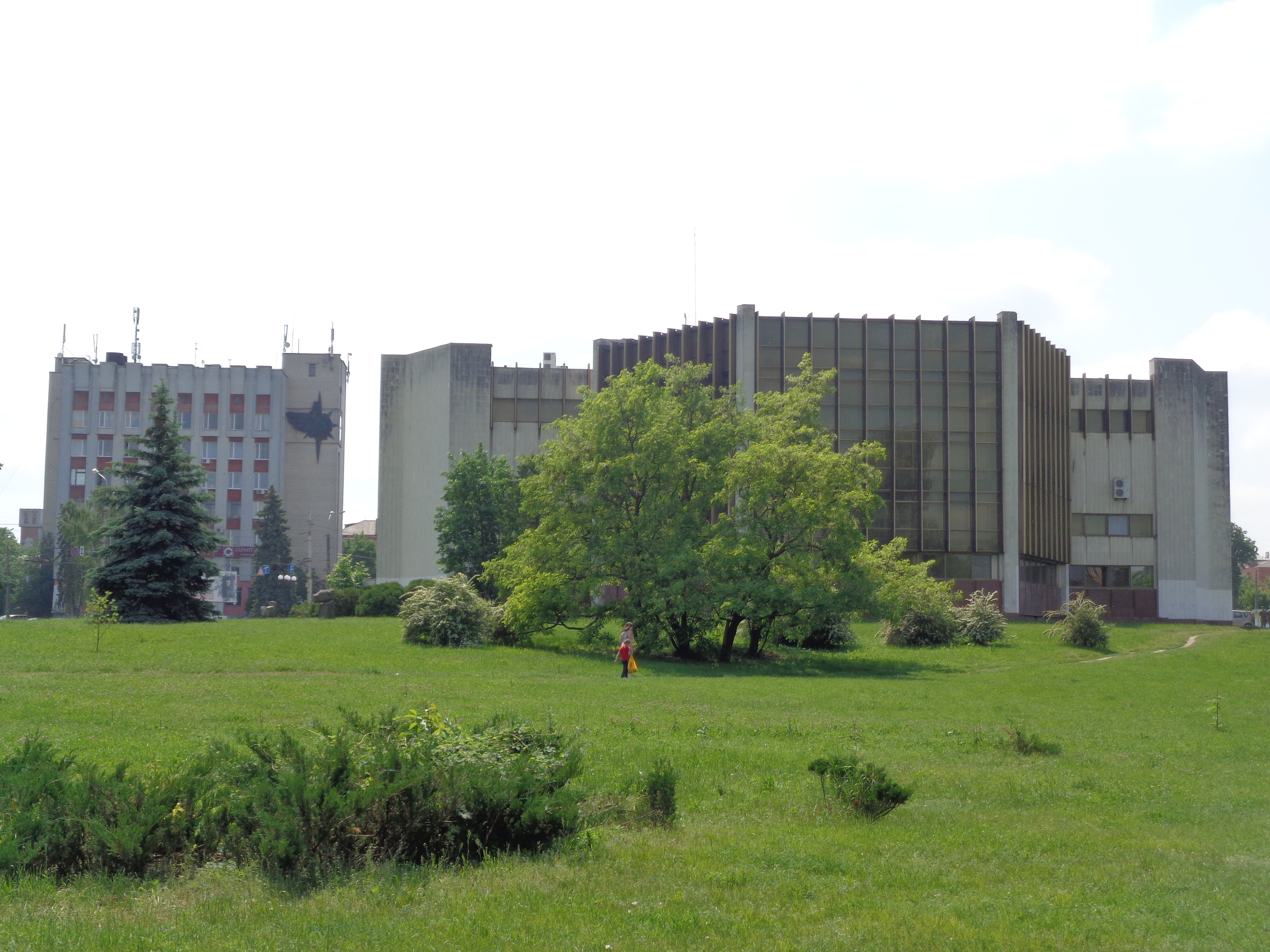
Back view

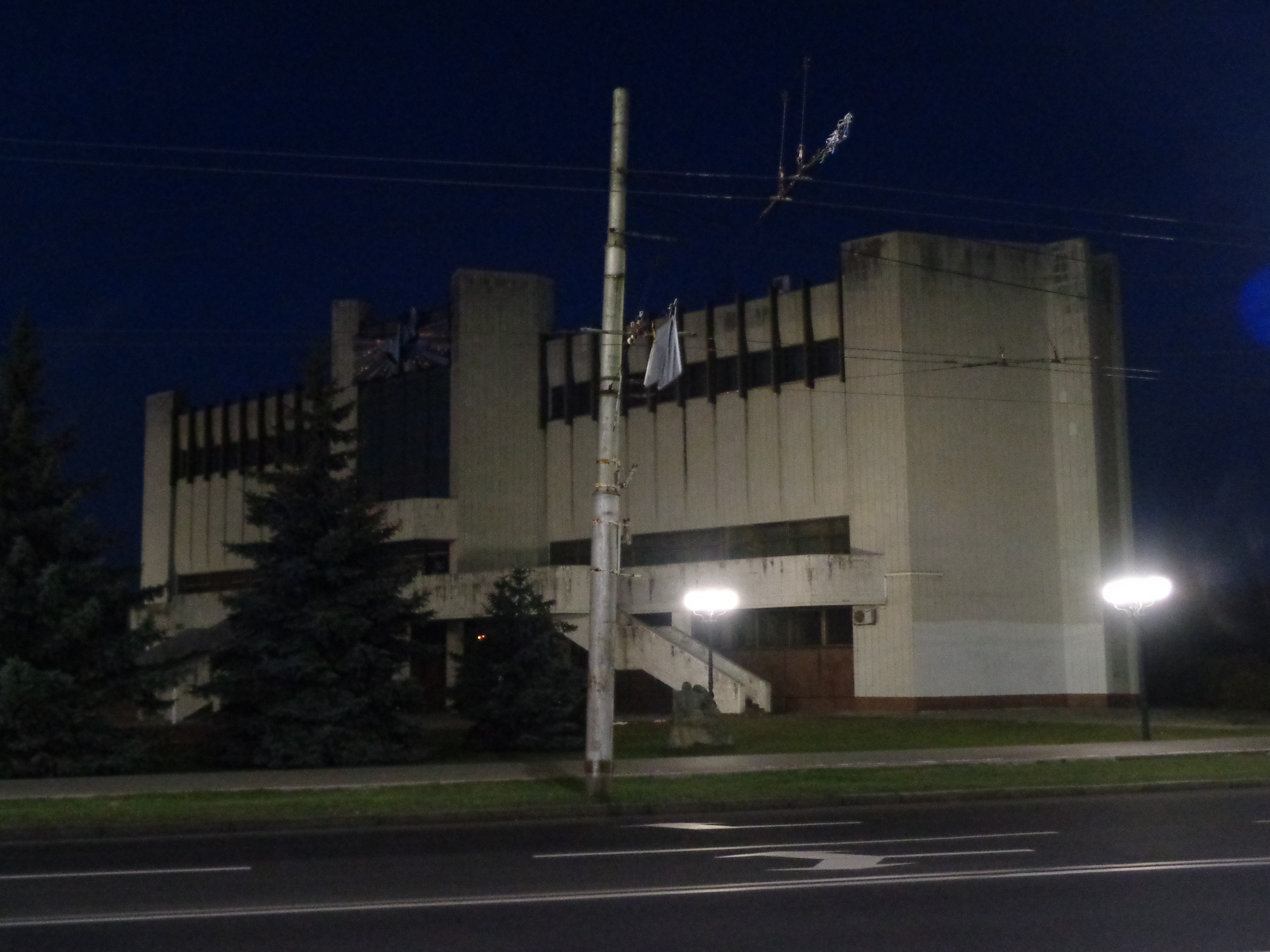
At night

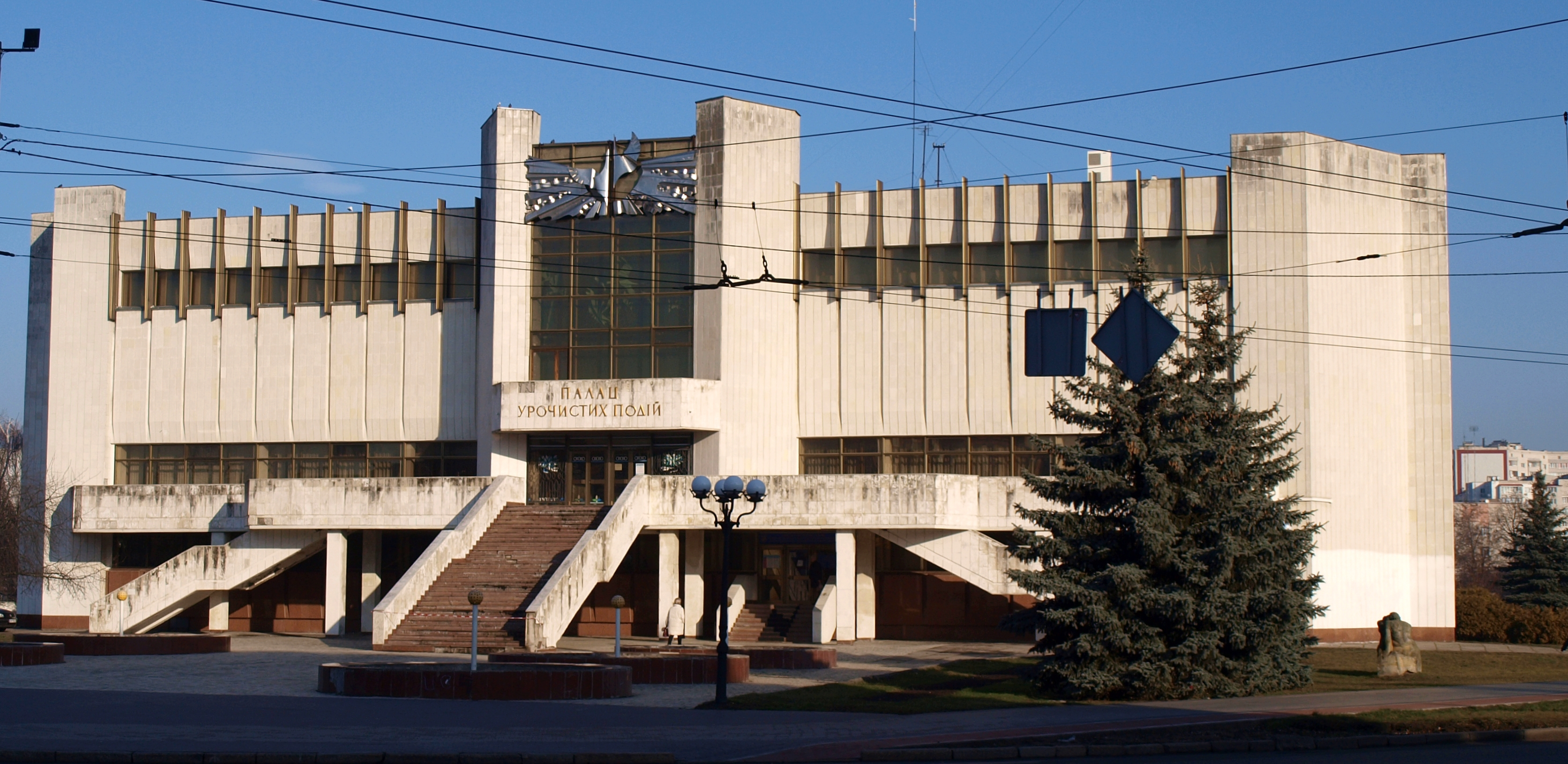
View of Wedding Palace

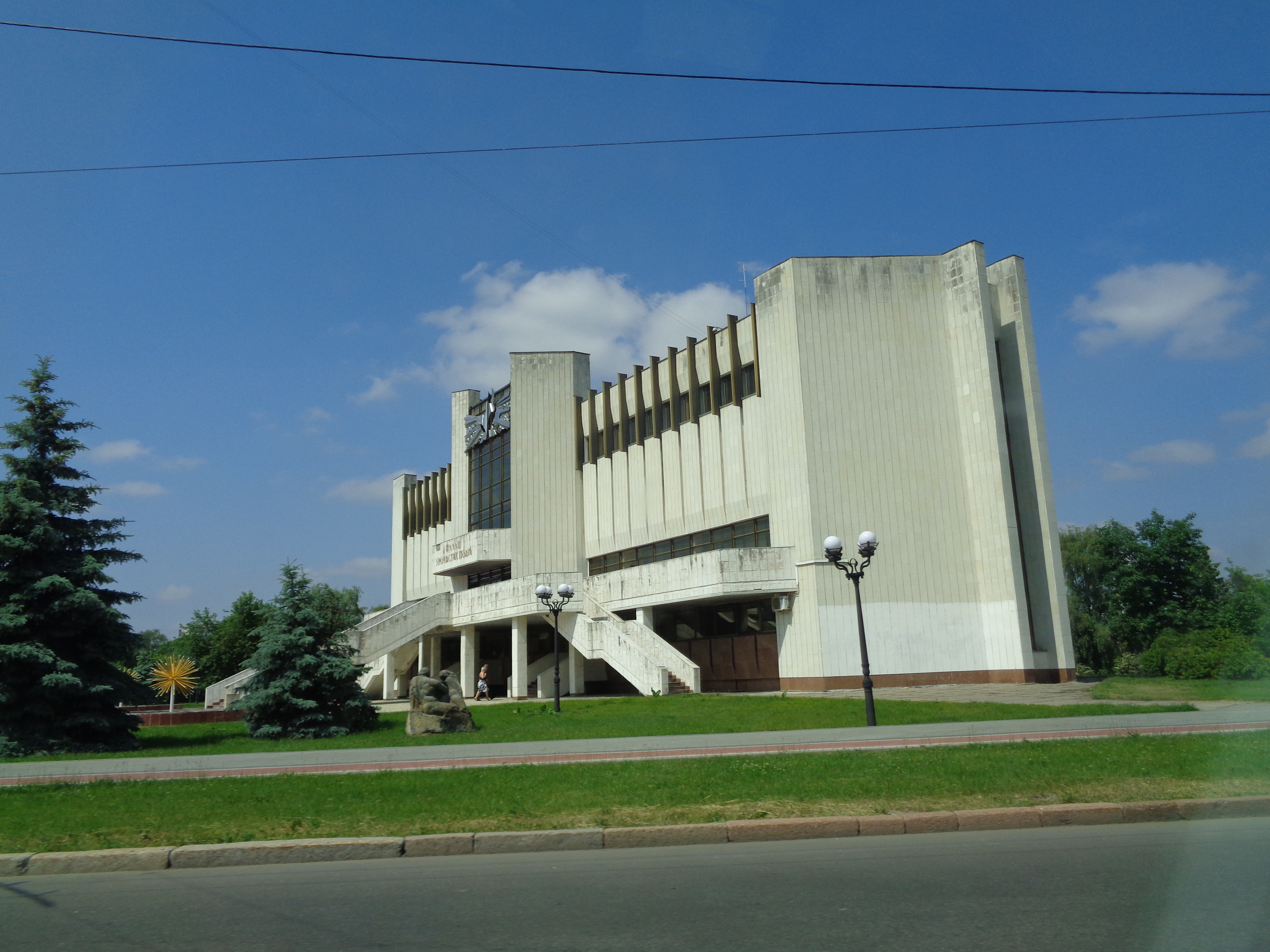
Side of the Wedding Palace
