= Aviators Square (Chernihiv) =

Square in Chernihiv, Ukraine

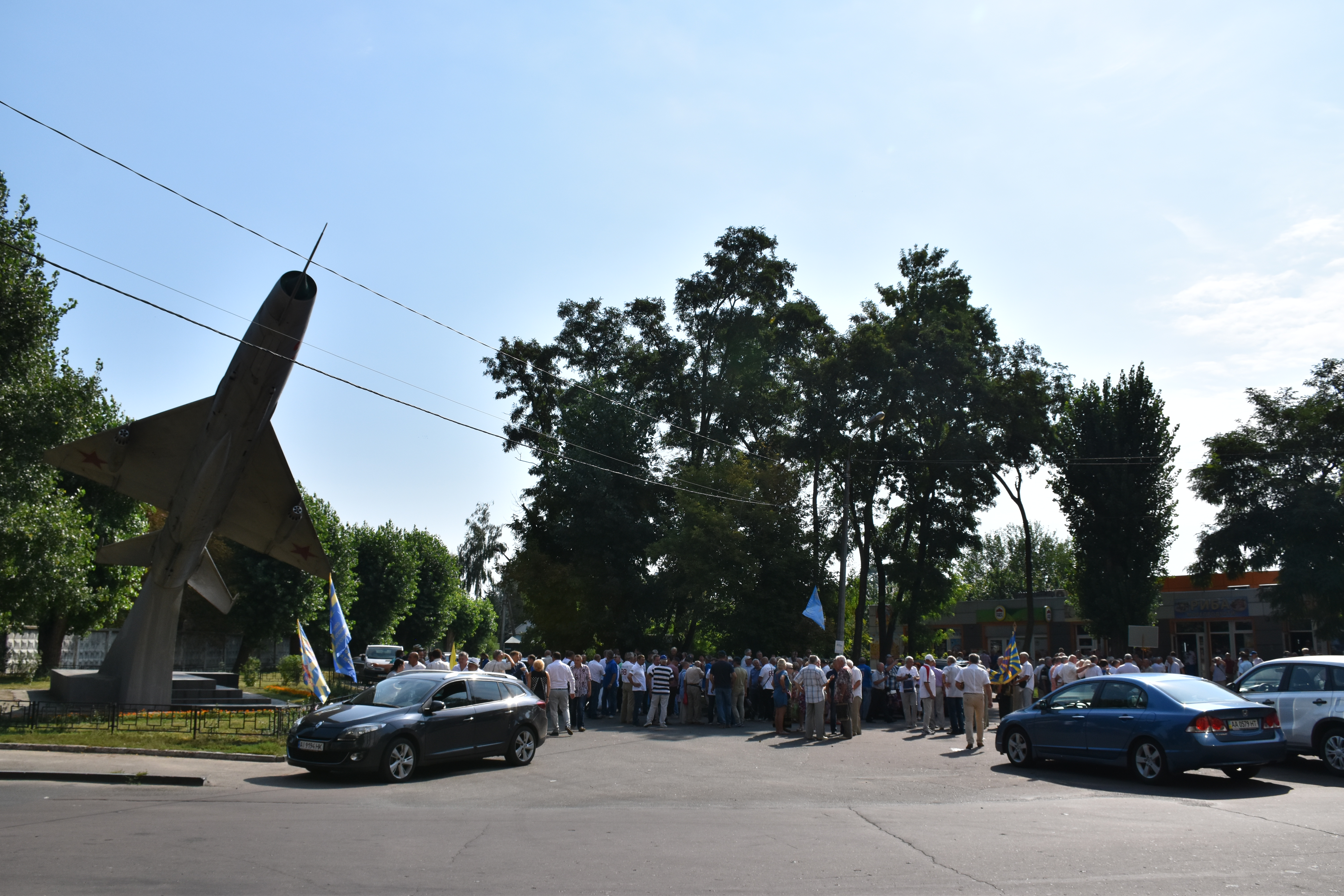
- Interactive map of Aviators Square
- Native name: Площа Авиаторів (Ukrainian)
- Former name: Aviators Square
- Type: Square
- Addresses: 4 Streletskaya street
- Location: Chernihiv, Chernihiv Oblast Ukraine
- Coordinates: 51°31′09″N 31°17′10″E
- From: Routes №7, 26, 37: Streletskaya Street

Aviators Square (Ukrainian: Площа Авиаторів) is a square in the Desnianskyi district of Chernihiv at the intersection of Kursanta Eskova and Streletskaya streets.

== History ==
On August 15, 2015, the Aviators' Square was opened and given the name. Improvement is planned and on March 19, the Commission for Organizing the Names of Chernihiv Streets unanimously decided to name the part of the territory near the monument where the model of the MiG-21 military aircraft is located on Streletskaya Street.

== Description ==
Traffic is not regulated by traffic lights. A monument to the MiG-21 military aircraft is located on the square. To the west of Kursanta Eskova Street there is a multi-storey residential building (on Letnaya Street), to the east - a park area and a manor house (on Yuriy Mezentsev Street). To the north of the square is the territory of the Educational and Scientific Institute of Economics of the University of Technology (until 1995 the territory of the Pilot School).

== Transport ==
- there are no trolleybus routes.
- bus / march. taxi routes № 7, 26, 37 stop Streletskaya Street.

== Gallery ==
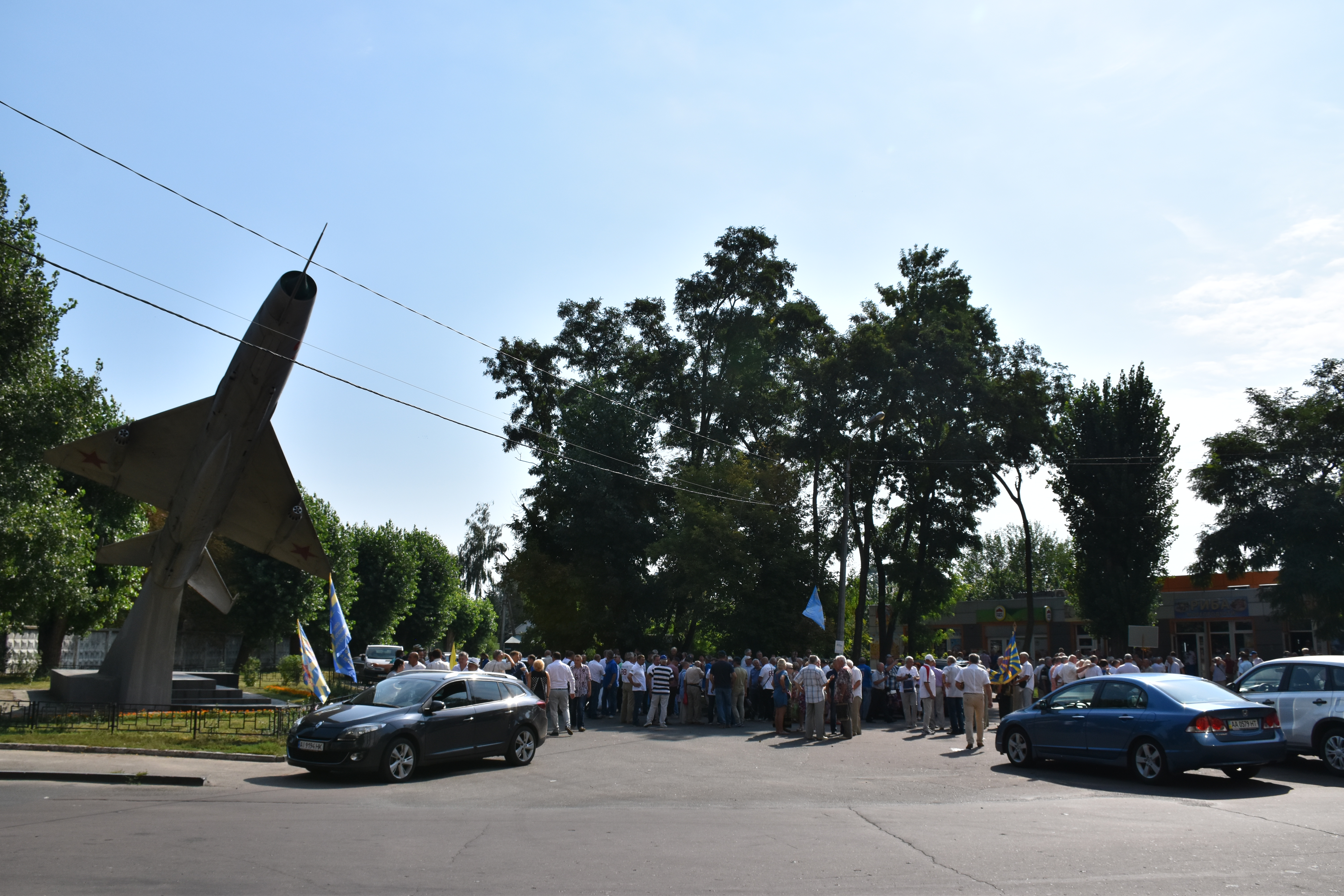

== See also ==
- List of streets and squares in Chernihiv
