= Alexander Square (Chernihiv) =

Public square in Chernihiv, Ukraine

- Олександрівська площа
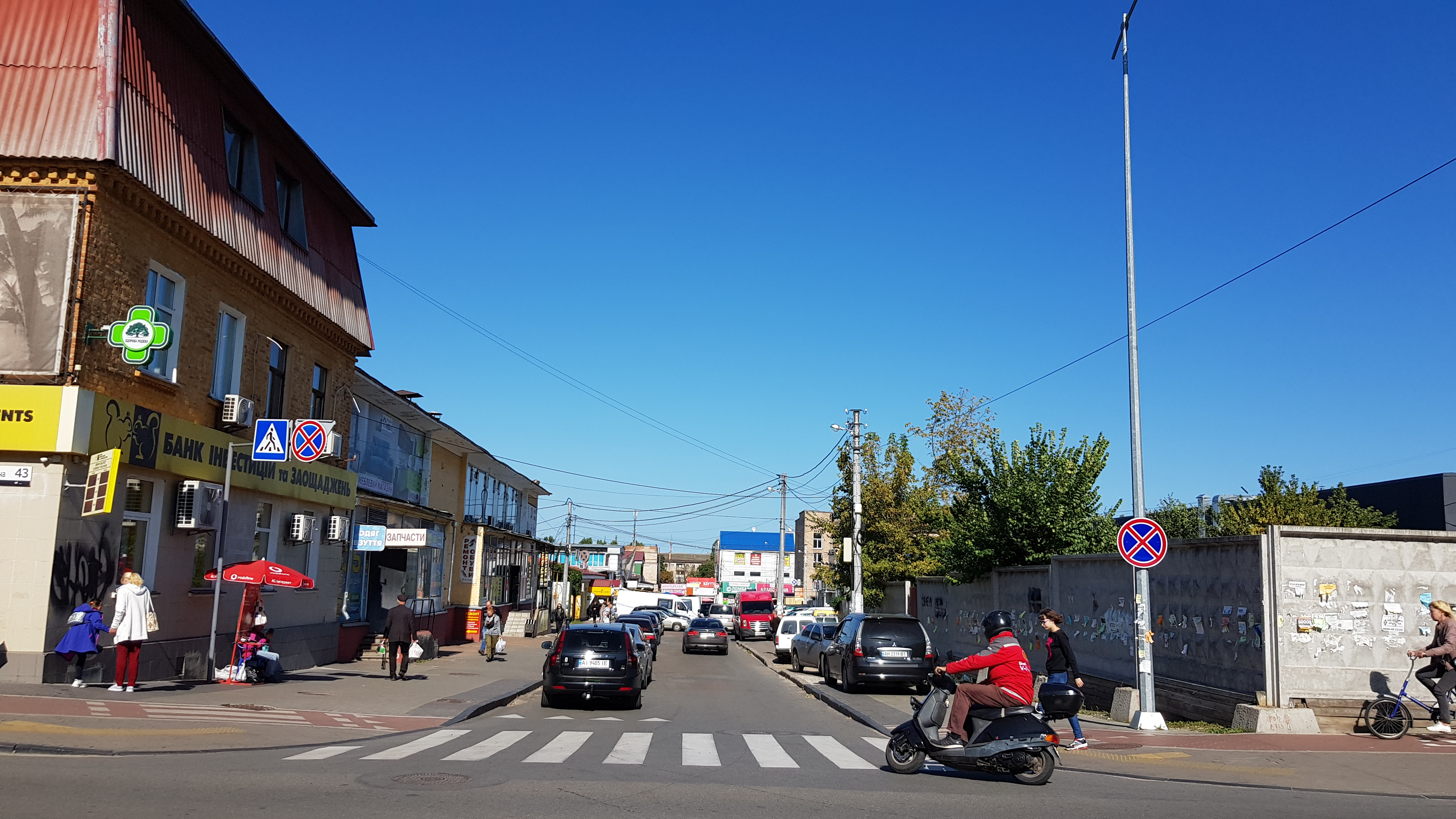
- Interactive map of Alexander Square
- Native name: Олександрівська площа (Ukrainian)
- Former name: Alexander Square
- Type: Square
- Addresses: Novozavodskaya
- Location: Chernihiv, Chernihiv Oblast Ukraine
- Coordinates: 51°29′40″N 31°17′20″E

Alexander Square (Ukrainian: Олександрівська площа) is a historical square, on the territory of the modern Novozavodsky district of Chernihiv.

== History ==
Alexander Square was created according to the city development plan of 1805 on a wasteland near the Church of the Resurrection and after the closure of the cemetery. Along the old road to Lyubech, an architectural and spatial complex of the square with a group of buildings "for measures and weights" has developed. The area was also called Novobazaarnaya, since trade in timber, hay and livestock was concentrated here, and fairs were held.

In 1927, Aleksandrovskaya Square was renamed October 25 Square in honor of the date of the October Revolution. After the Great Patriotic War, most of the square was built up, the rest was set aside for the Central City Bazaar (now Market, 1). In the 1960s, part of the square was attached to Rabochaya Street.

== Description ==
Aleksandrovskaya Square was located between modern Mira Avenue, Ivan Mazepa Street, Rynochnaya Street and Aleksey Bakurinsky Lane (near Craft Street). The area is occupied by residential high-rise buildings, service establishments and the territory of public utilities.

On the territory of the television center, the House of Measure and Weight of the 19th century (Ivan Mazepa Street, 4 A) has been preserved - architectural monuments of local significance. Near the square are the Resurrection Church (1772-1799) and the People's House (late 19th - early 20th centuries). House No. 56 on Remeslennaya Street was built in 1911 in the northwestern part of the square, where the Jewish locksmith and blacksmith school "Young Proletarian" moved in 1922.

== See also ==
- List of streets and squares in Chernihiv
