= Church of All Saints, Chernihiv =

Church in Chernihiv Oblast, Ukraine

Church of All Saints
- Храм усіх святих Чернігівських
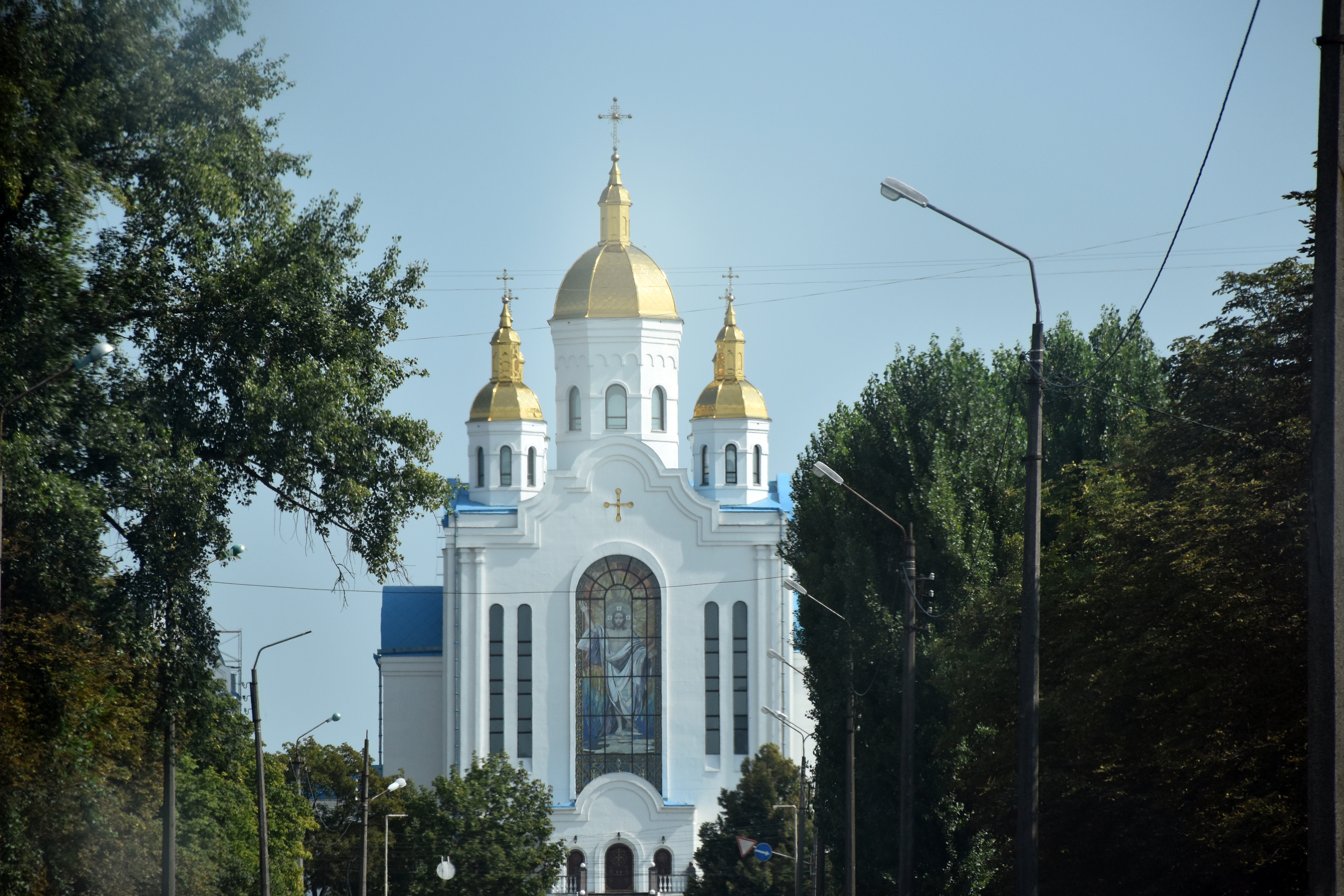
- Church of All Saints in Chernihiv
- Church of All Saints
- 51°30′46″N 31°19′36″E
- Location: Vsikhsviatska St, 1, Chernihiv, Chernihiv Oblast, Ukraine, 14030
- Country: Ukraine
- Denomination: Eastern Orthodox Church
- Website: http://xvc-cn.net.ua/

History
- Status: Chapel

Architecture
- Functional status: Active; Museum
- Architect(s): V. Ustinov, T. Ovsyannikov
- Architectural type: Church
- Years built: 2001
- Completed: 2011

Administration
- Diocese: Chernihiv

The Church of All Saints (Ukrainian: Храм усіх святих Чернігівських, romanized: Khram usikh sviatykh Chernihivskykh) is an Eastern Orthodox Church church in Chernihiv.

== Location ==
The church is located in the residential area of Rokossovsky Street near the Niva market, on Heroes of Stalingrad Square. Construction began in late 2000. As of 2011, it is almost complete.

== History ==
Before the complex was built, there were several construction projects in this area. Plans were in place to build a cultural centre, a recreational park and a shopping center; in the end it was decided to build a temple.

The area, where almost half of Chernihiv lives, did not have its own church before, and accordingly a temple holiday. In the summer of 2001, the Holy Synod of the UOC-MP decided to celebrate the Day of All Chernihiv Saints.

It falls on the first Saturday after the Feast of Saints Peter and Paul, that is, on the first Saturday after July 12. This decision was not accidental, because a number of Ukrainian Orthodox saints—26–are from Chernihiv.

These include Prince Igor, martyrs for the faith of Prince Michael and boyar Fyodor, St. Anthony of Pechersk—founder of the Kiev-Pechersk Lavra, educators Danylo Tuptal and Ivan Maksymovych—founder of the Chernihiv Collegium, Metropolitan Tobolsky and many others.

== Construction ==
The church was designed by Chernihiv architect Viktor Matviyovych Ustinov with the participation of Tamara Ovsyannikova, head of the firm "Architect". But the rector of the church, Archpriest Fr. Petro Kaznovetsky made significant changes and adjustments to the project. The author wanted, according to him, to have the right proportions of the temple, to make it look light and attractive. The church has two floors, its length and width are 30 meters, height is 52 meters. By the end of 2000 the foundation of the future building was laid, and in 2001 the construction of the walls began. 1.5 million pieces were used for masonry. bricks. The lower floor is consecrated in honor of the new martyrs of the confessors of the Russian Land, who suffered for the faith, for the Orthodox Church during the total repression of the first half of the XX century. The consecration ceremony was presided over by Metropolitan of Kyiv and All Ukraine, Primate of the Ukrainian Orthodox Church (Moscow Patriarchate) His Beatitude Volodymyr. The upper floor is consecrated in honor of All Saints of Chernihiv.

Despite the fact that the temple stands in the lowlands, its golden domes can be seen even from Victory Avenue near the Central Market.

== Architecture ==
The temple is five-domed, two-storey. It clearly traces the traditional verticality of the volumes: from the first floor the view smoothly passes to the two-story side annexes, then to the southern and northern vestibules, then picked up by the verticality of four small domes and the central large dome. This expressive compositional technique has been widespread in wooden and stone architecture since ancient times. Narrow high windows also emphasize verticality. Facades are decorated with corner pilasters with capitals, as well as a multi-profile cornice of complex shape. The drum of the central dome is decorated with an arched belt. The main staircase leads to the central western entrance on the second floor. The central western facade is decorated with a unique stained glass window, which has no analogues.

The stained glass area is 70 m^{2} (750 sq ft), with a height of 12 m (39 ft) and a width of 6 metres (20 ft). On two-sided stained glass is an icon of the Resurrection of Christ, which depicts Jesus Christ in full height. The stained glass window makes an impression inside the temple, although it is visible from the street. To create such an effect, special glass was used, which was made by modern technologies. Stained glass lighting at night will give the temple it's grandeur and beauty. Two semicircular wings with an arcade will be added to the church, where there will be a Sunday school for adults and children, a library of spiritual literature, special workshops: icon painting, wood carving, artistic embroidery, church choral singing, and a sports and health center for children and youth.

The left wing will end with a bell tower, and the right a necessary church in honor of St. George. This church will host weddings, baptisms, funerals, i.e. services that are held every day.

== Gallery ==
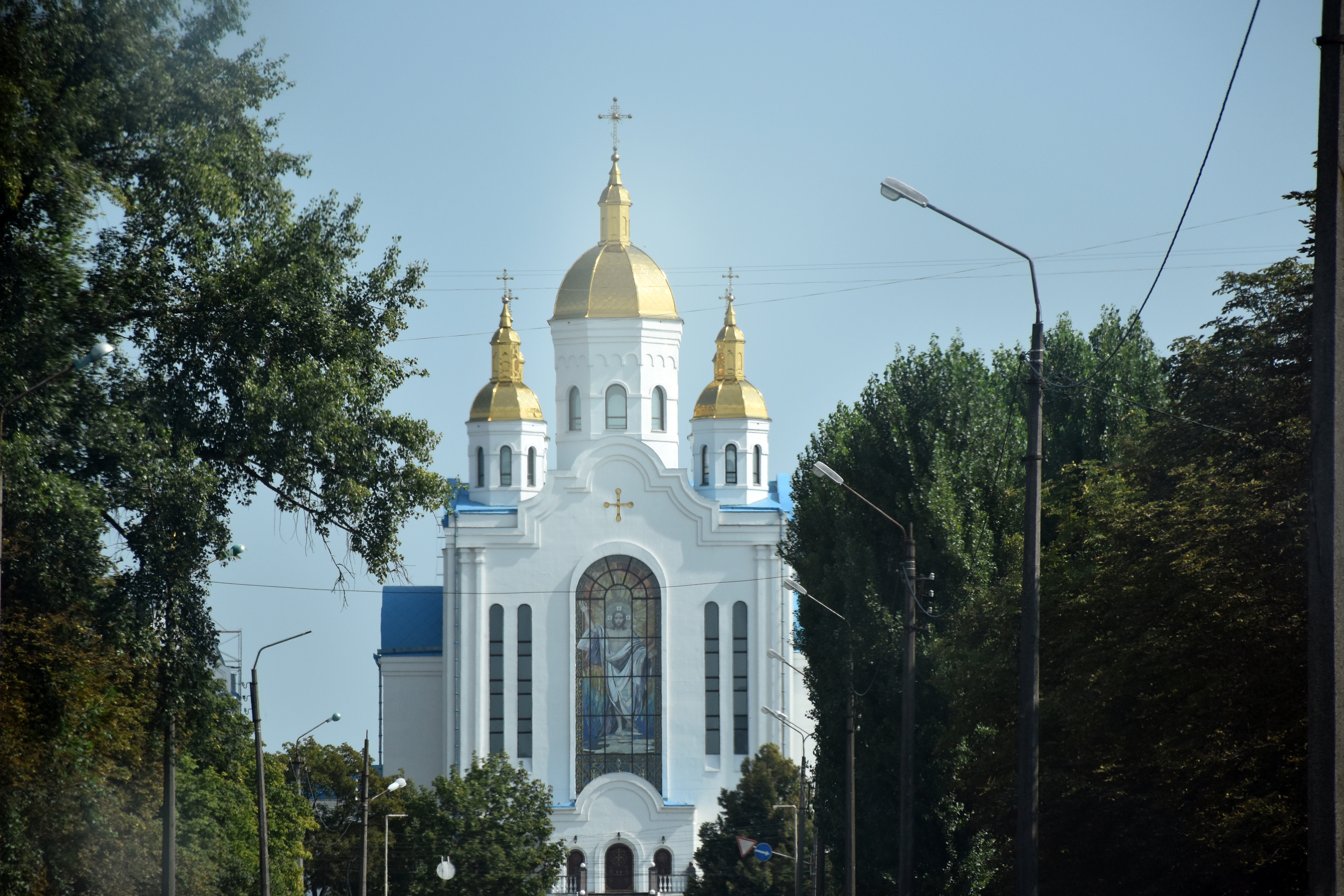

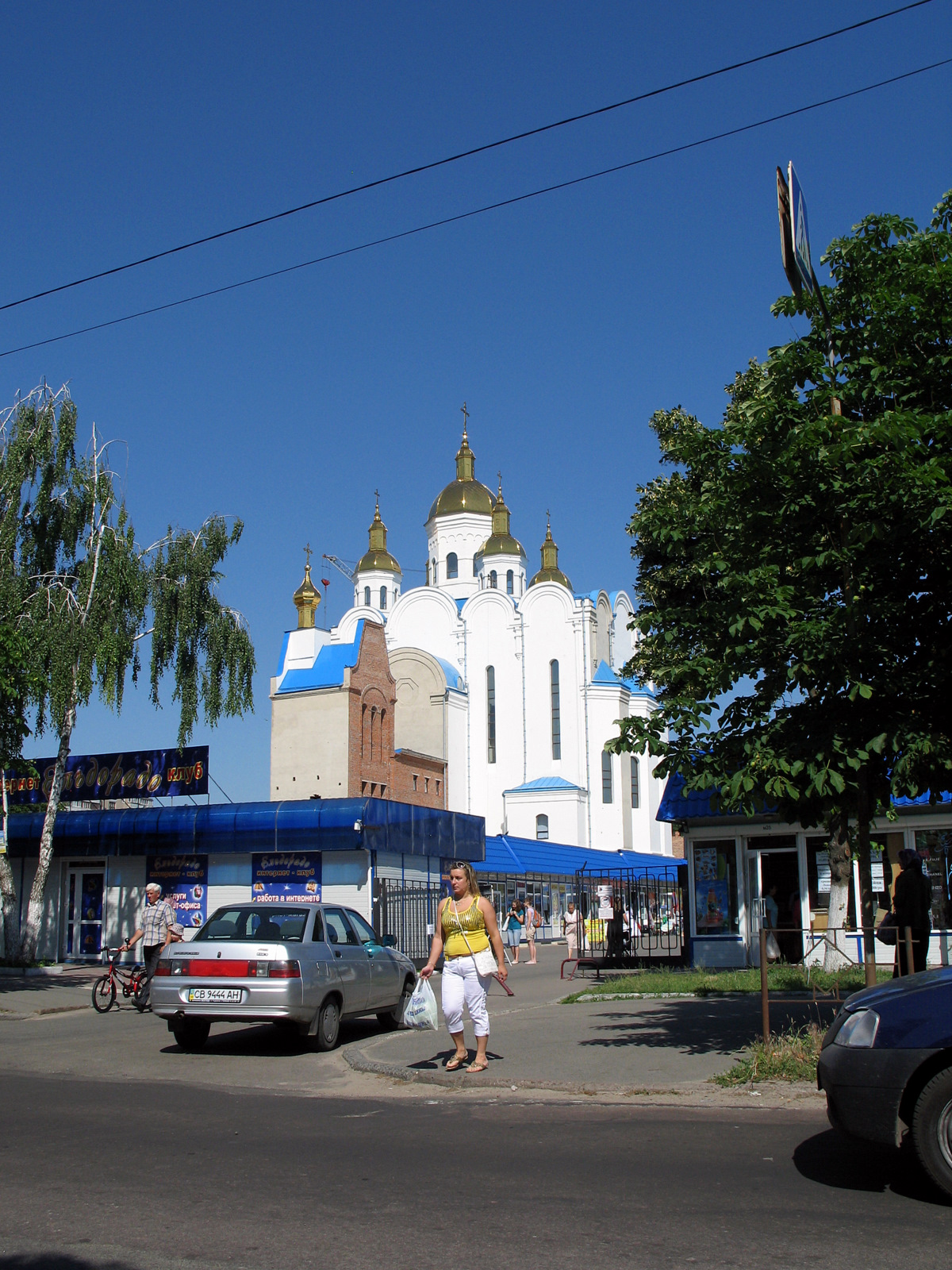

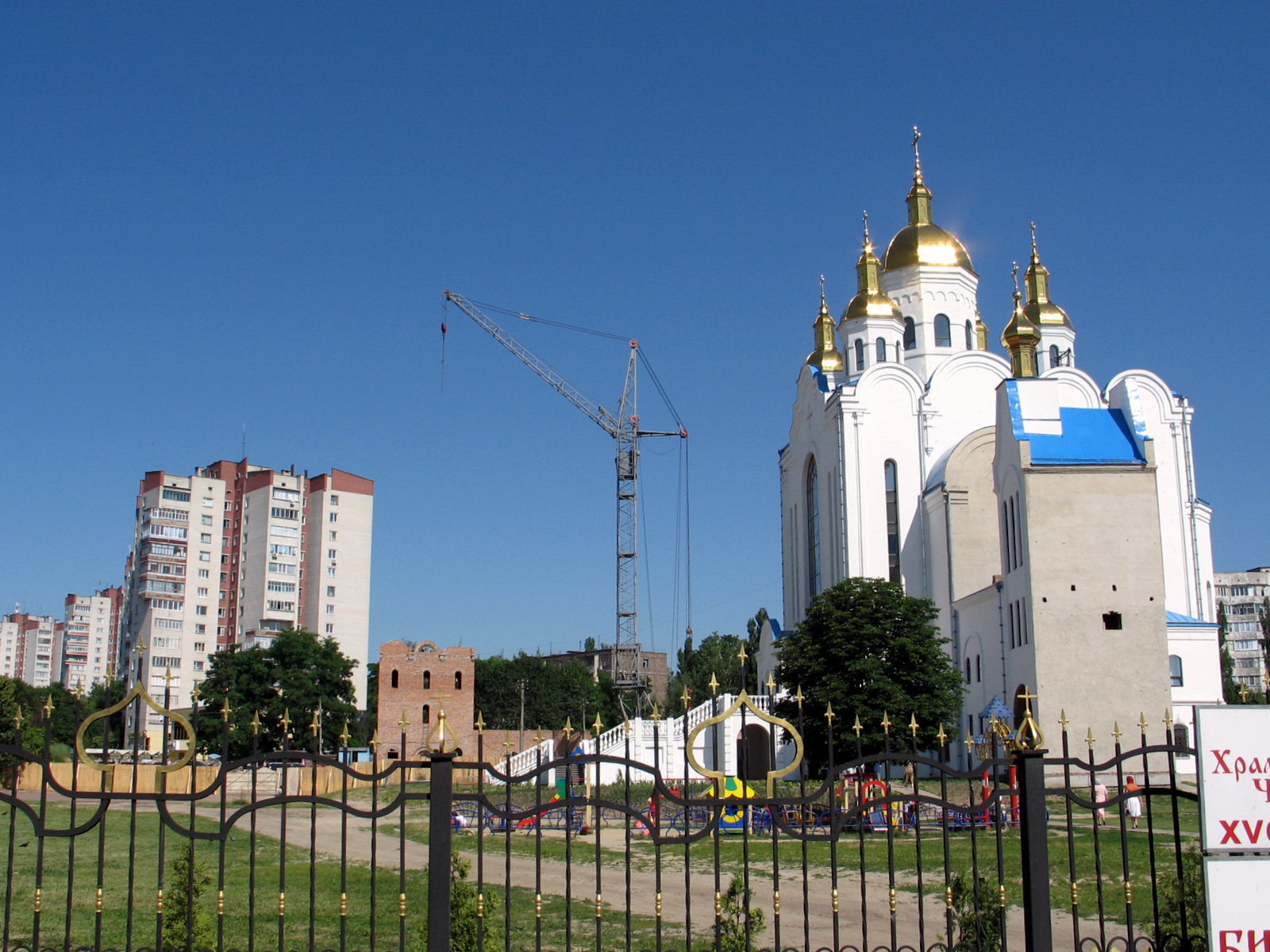

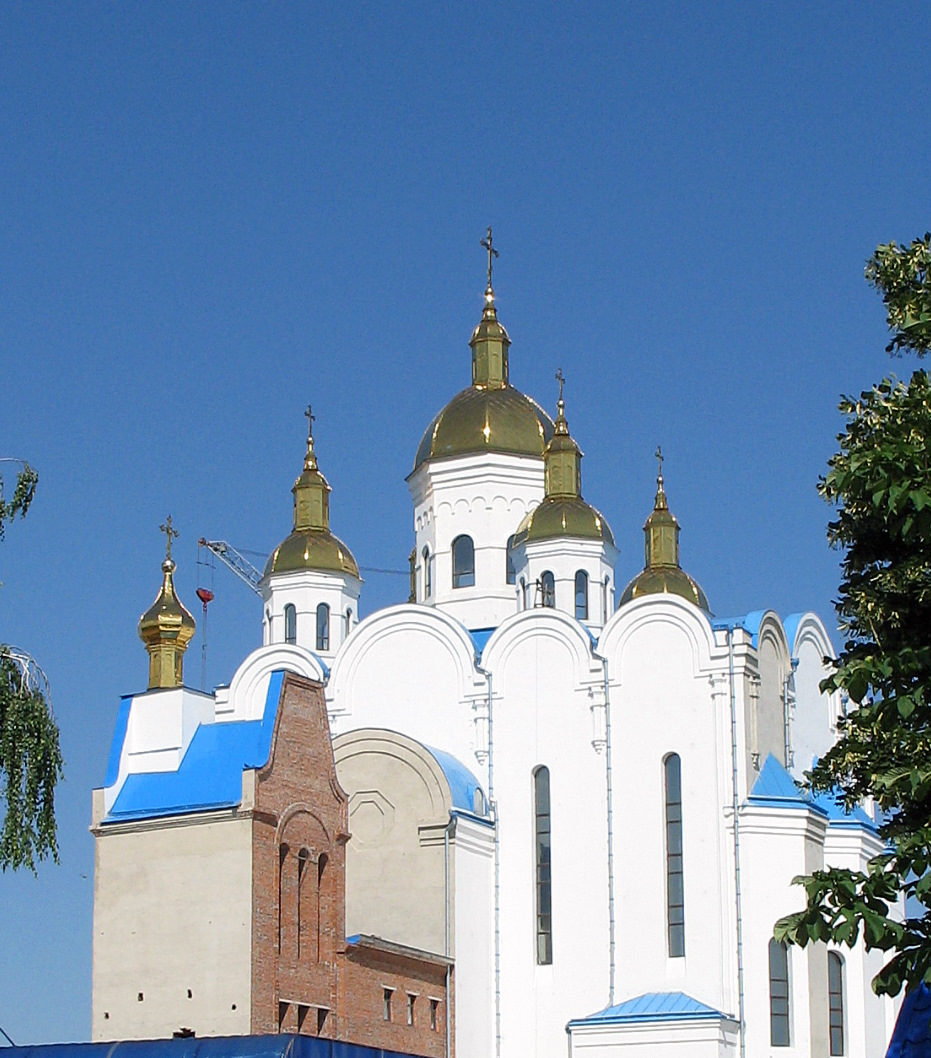

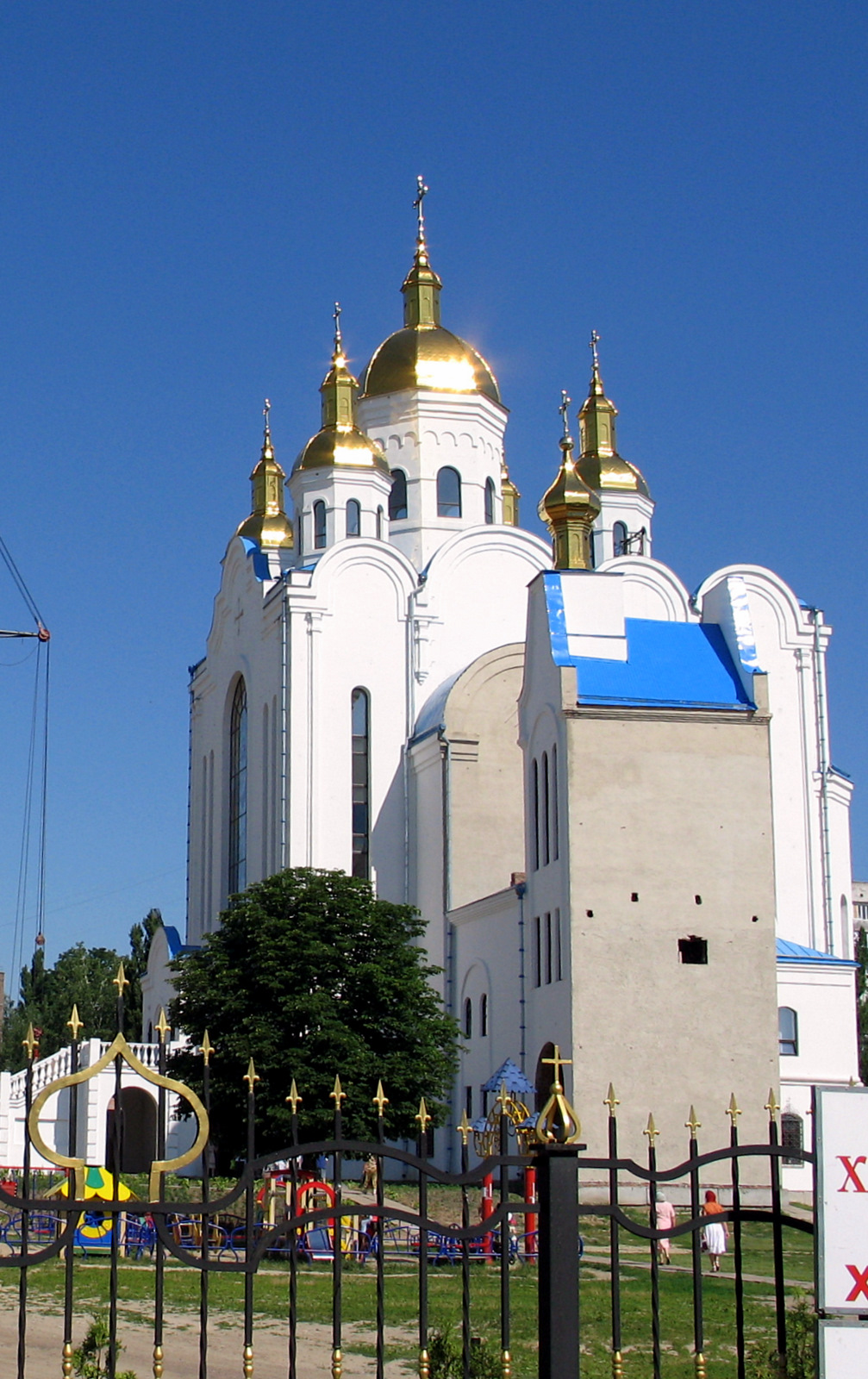

== See also ==
- List of Churches and Monasteries in Chernihiv

== Links ==
- wikimapia.org
