= Heroes of Stalingrad Square =

Square in Chernihiv, Ukraine

- Interactive map of Heroes of Stalingrad Square
- Native name: Олександрівська площа (Ukrainian)
- Former name: Heroes of Stalingrad Square
- Type: Square
- Location: Chernihiv, Chernihiv Oblast Ukraine
- Coordinates: 51°30′41″N 31°19′37″E

Heroes of Stalingrad Square (Ukrainian: Площа Героїв Сталінграду) an area in the Desnyansky district of Chernihiv, at the intersection of Rokossovsky and Vsekhsvyatskaya streets, a historically developed area (district) Bobrovitsky residential area. Previously, the public transport stop along Rokossovsky Street was named after the square before being renamed as Vsekhsvyatskaya Street.

== History ==
In 1983, the square received its present name - in honor of the 40th anniversary of the end of the Battle of Stalingrad - an important battle of the Eastern Front of World War II.

In April 2023 Ukrainian President Volodymyr Zelenskyy signed derussification-laws. This law prohibits toponymy that symbolizes or glorifies Russia, individuals who carried out aggression against Ukraine (or another country), as well as totalitarian policies and practices related to the Russian Empire and the Soviet Union, including Ukrainians living in Russian-occupied territories.

== Description ==
At the corner of the intersection of Rokossovsky and Vsekhsvyatskaya streets (opposite Vsekhsvyatskaya street house No. 2), is located in the residential area of Rokossovsky Street near the Niva market and Church of All Saints. A memorial sign to the Heroes of Stalingrad was located, which was dismantled on 7 August 2017 due to an emergency condition.

== See also ==
- List of streets and squares in Chernihiv
