= Bohdan Khmelnytsky Square (Chernihiv) =

Square in Chernihiv, Ukraine

- Interactive map of Bohdan Khmelnytsky Square
- Native name: Сквер имени Богдана Хмельницкого (Ukrainian)
- Former name: Bohdan Khmelnytsky Square
- Type: Square
- Location: Chernihiv, Chernihiv Oblast Ukraine
- Coordinates: 51°30′41″N 31°19′37″E

Bohdan Khmelnytsky Square (Ukrainian: Площа Авиаторів) square located in the center of Chernihiv in the Desnyansky district. The square is named after the statesman Bohdan Khmelnytsky. The area is 3.03 hectares.

== History ==
After the Great Patriotic War, in 1956, a square named after Bohdan Khmelnytsky was demolished on the right side of Sverdlov Street from Kuibyshev Square to Frunze Street.

In 2011, the Chernihiv City Council allocated funds for the reconstruction of the park (according to a plan developed in 2005), which should be completed by Euro 2012. The total cost of the project is ₴7.5 million. But the reconstruction project was not fully implemented.

In May 2017, a monument to Bohdan Khmelnytsky was unveiled 180 degrees - facing the church, theater and central square of Chernihiv. The monument itself was renovated and painted in a dark golden color.

On September 22, 2017, the square was reopened after reconstruction. The budget for the reconstruction of the park is ₴15.5 million.

== Description ==
Located in the suburbs between the streets of Hetman Polubotko, Shevchenko, Mstislavskaya and Red Square. On the territory of the square there is an architectural monument of national importance Pyatnitskaya Church (12th century, protected No. 815) - a part of the historical and architectural reserve "Chernihiv ancient" and a monument of monumental art of local significance monument to Bohdan Khmelnytsky (1956, protected No. 66).

The square has the shape of an irregular rectangle. The alleys of the park are covered with asphalt. There are two small and one large fountains in the park.

== Transport ==
trolleybus No. 1, 2, bus / march. taxis No. 27, 38, 39, 44 - stops Polubotka Street and Shevchenko Street, as well as the regional theater and Pyatnitskaya Street.

== Nature ==
There are 38 species of plants, including 10 native species. The range of the future square, as well as other park areas of the city in the postwar period, was created by the Chernihiv Botanical Garden, the state farm "Desnyansky" and KP "Zelenbud".

== See also ==
- List of streets and squares in Chernihiv
