= Building of the Chernihiv Regional Youth Center =

Former theater in Chernihiv, Ukraine

Building of Chernihiv Regional Youth Center
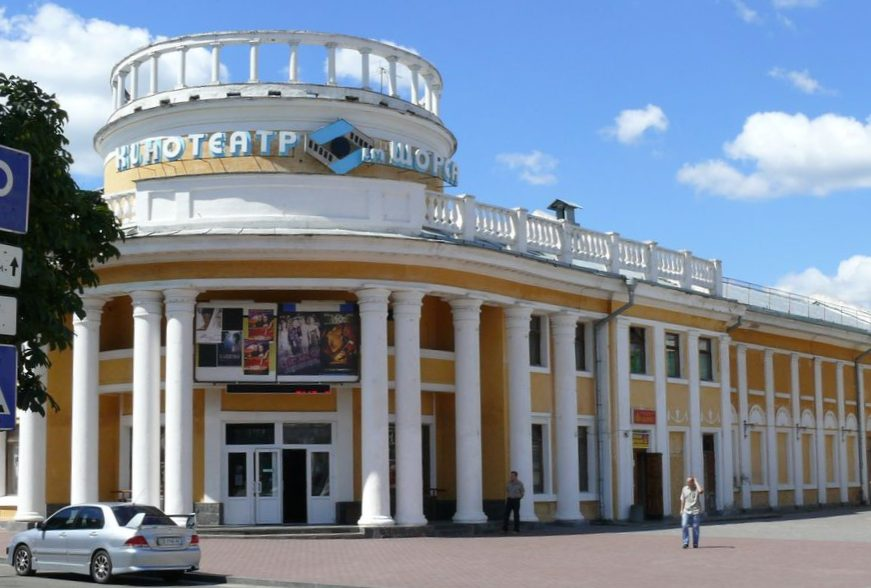
- Interactive map of Building of Chernihiv Regional Youth Center
- Address: 3 Mahistratska Street, Krasna Square; Chernihiv; Ukraine
- Coordinates: 51°29′28″N 31°17′55″E
- Operator: houses the Chernihiv Regional Youth Center
- Type: Cinema

Construction
- Opened: 1875
- Demolished: 2022
- Rebuilt: 1947

Building of the Chernihiv Regional Youth Center (Ukrainian: Будинок Чернігівського обласного молодіжного центру), formerly Shchors cinema (Ukrainian: кінотеатр імені Щорса) was a building in Chernihiv, Ukraine. The building was an architectural monument of local significance in Chernihiv. A former cinema, the building has housed the Chernihiv Regional Youth Center since 2017.

== Description ==
Together with other buildings, it forms the architectural ensemble of Red Square. Brick, 2-storey, L-shaped house in plan. The facade faces east to Mahistratska Street and Krasna Square. The facade on the entrance side has a rounded corner. The axis of symmetry of the main facade is accentuated by a 10-column portico of the central entrance. The portico is crowned with an attic. A cylindrical volume rises along the central axis of the façade above the roof. The facade is decorated with pilasters. The ends of the building end in gables.

== History ==
In 1939, the cinema building was built. At the time of opening it was the best equipped cinema and became the third in the city ("First Soviet Cinema", "Komsomolets"). During the Great Patriotic War, the house was destroyed. The building was rebuilt in 1947.

From 17 to 25 November 1947, an open trial of German and Hungarian prisoners of war who committed war crimes took place in the cinema building [source not specified, for 257 days].

In 1962 the building was reconstructed: "red" and "round" halls were added. At the end of the 1980s, the cinema had three auditoriums: "red" - for 560, "blue" - for 450, "round" - for 100 seats. The cinema building was a venue for brass band concerts and evening dances. In the postwar years and until 1971 - the opening of the cinema "October" on Gagarin Street - was the only cinema in Chernihiv. In 1993 the "blue hall" burned down completely, in 1995 the building was reconstructed again.

By the decision of the executive committee of the Chernihiv regional council of people's deputies from 09.02.1996 No. 91 the status of an architectural monument of local value with protection No. 76-Chg. The building has its own "monument territory" and is located in the "complex protection zone of monuments of the historic city center", according to the rules of construction and use of the territory. An information board is installed on the building.

In 2017, the cinema was closed. The building housed the Chernihiv Regional Youth Center.

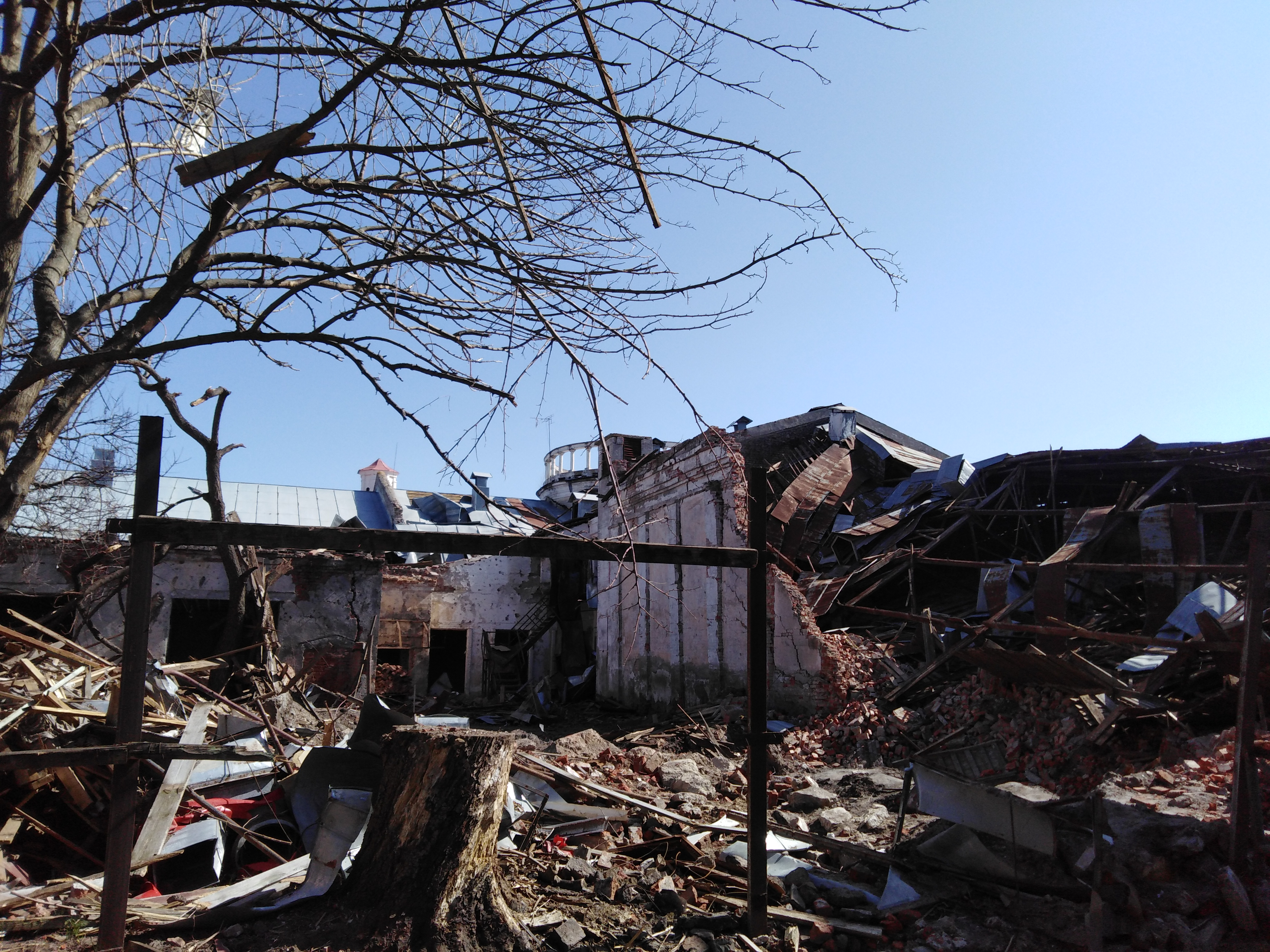
Ruins of the youth center

On February 27, 2022, the building was severely damaged (partially destroyed) during the Siege of Chernihiv by the 2022 Russian invasion of Ukraine - as a result of an air strike on the building of the Chernihiv City Council (State Bank House). In addition, the houses of Kyrponos Street - house No. 20А (Chernihiv Children's Dental Clinic - House where the writer GI Uspensky lived) and the 9-storey house No. 18 were damaged to varying degrees.

== Gallery ==
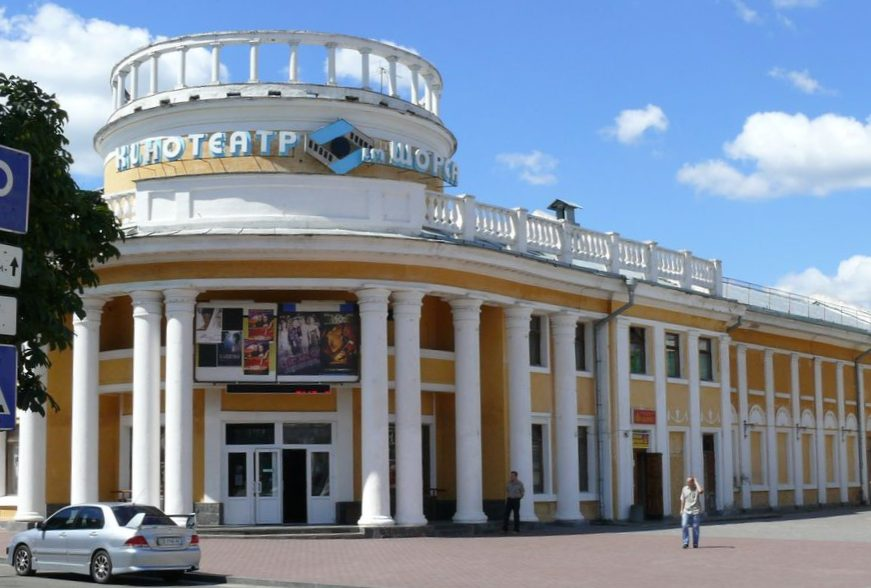

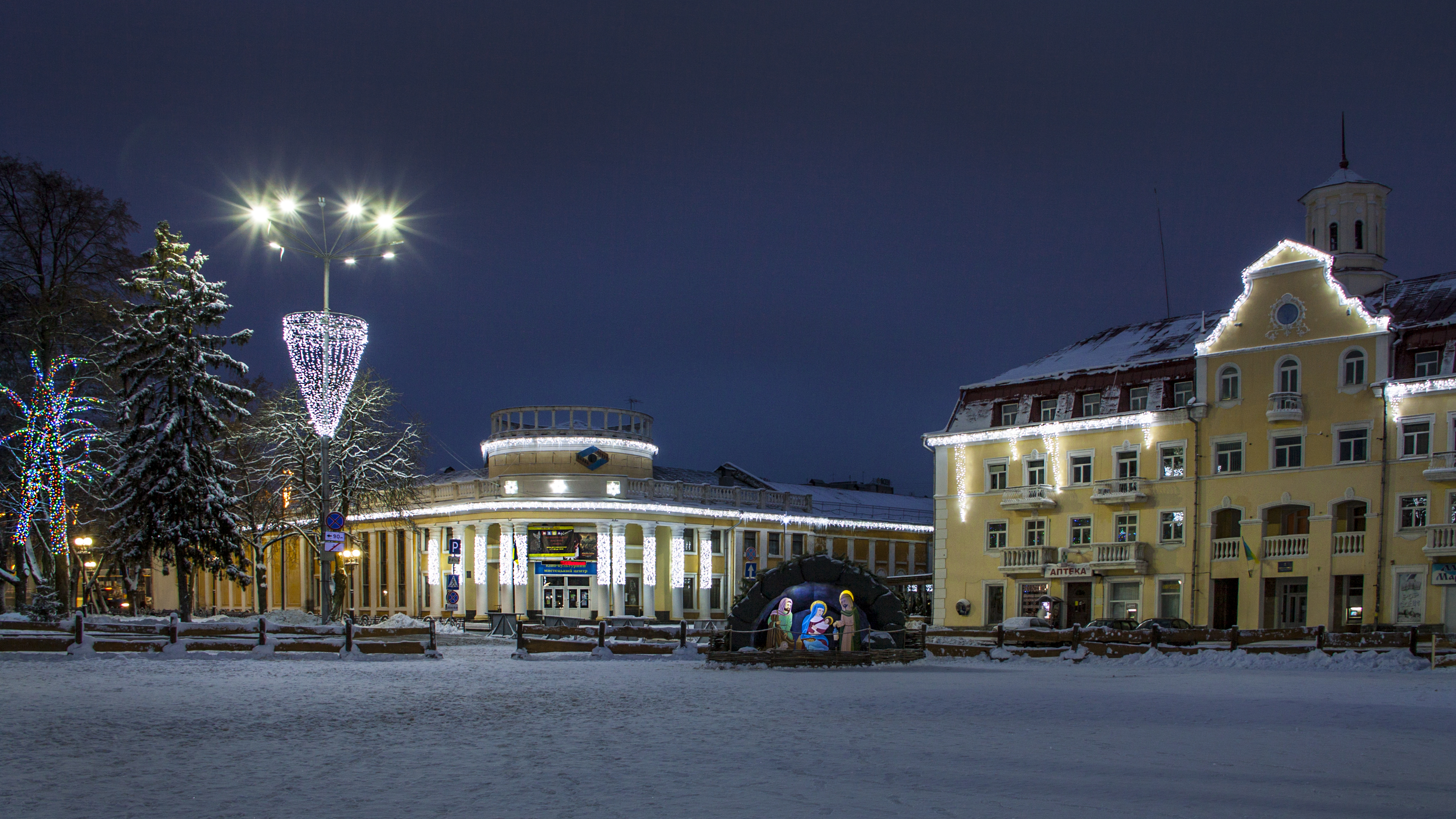

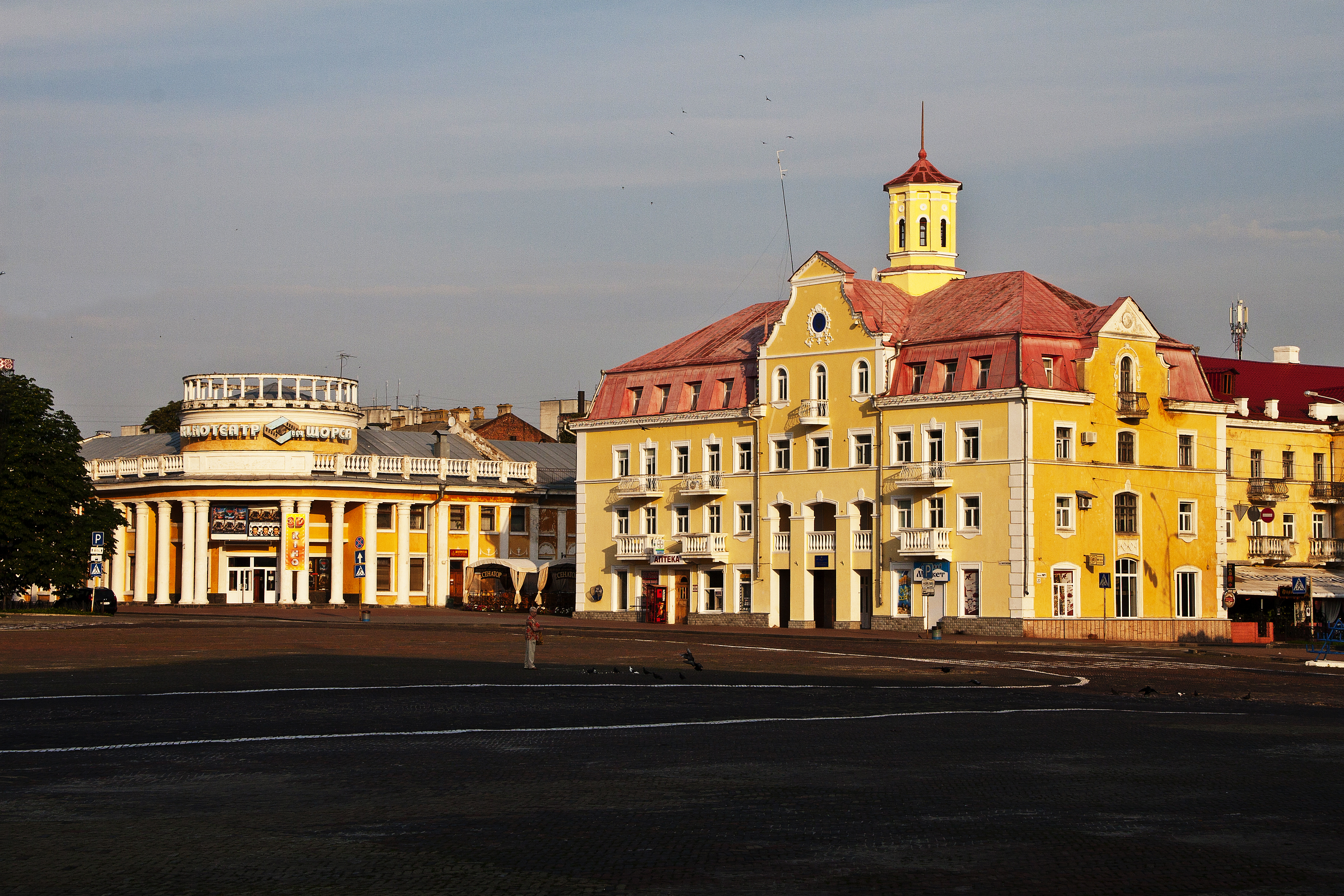

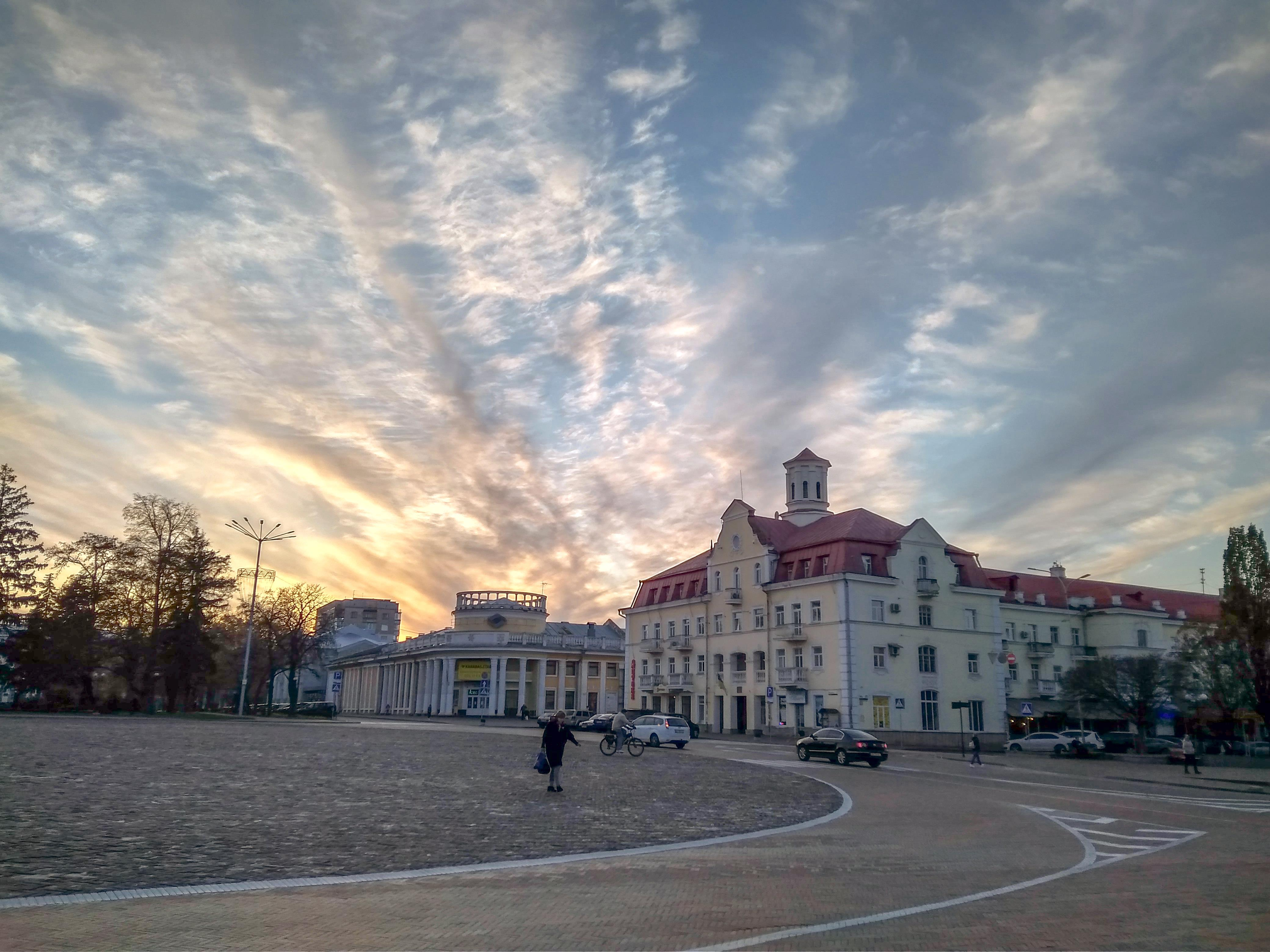

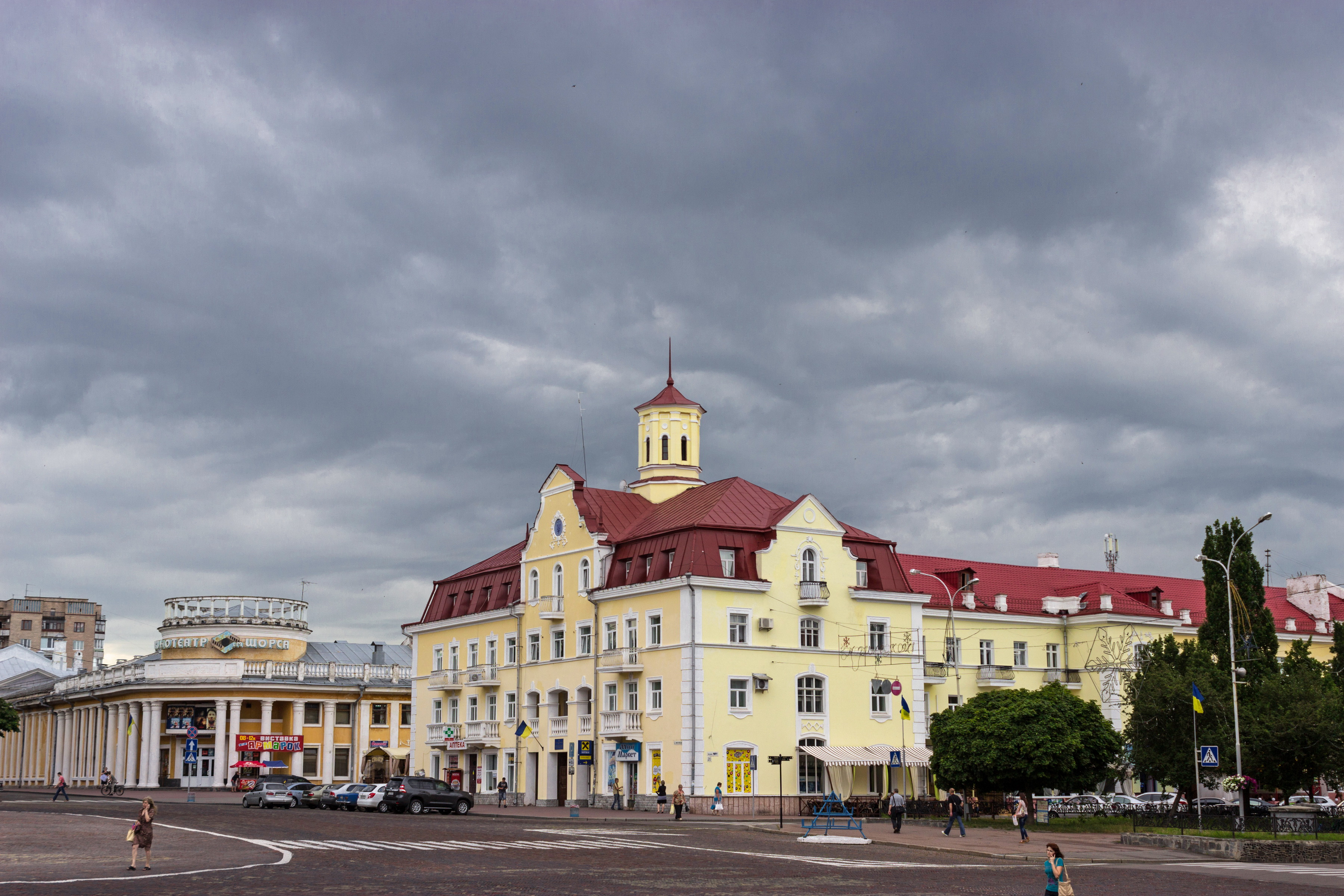

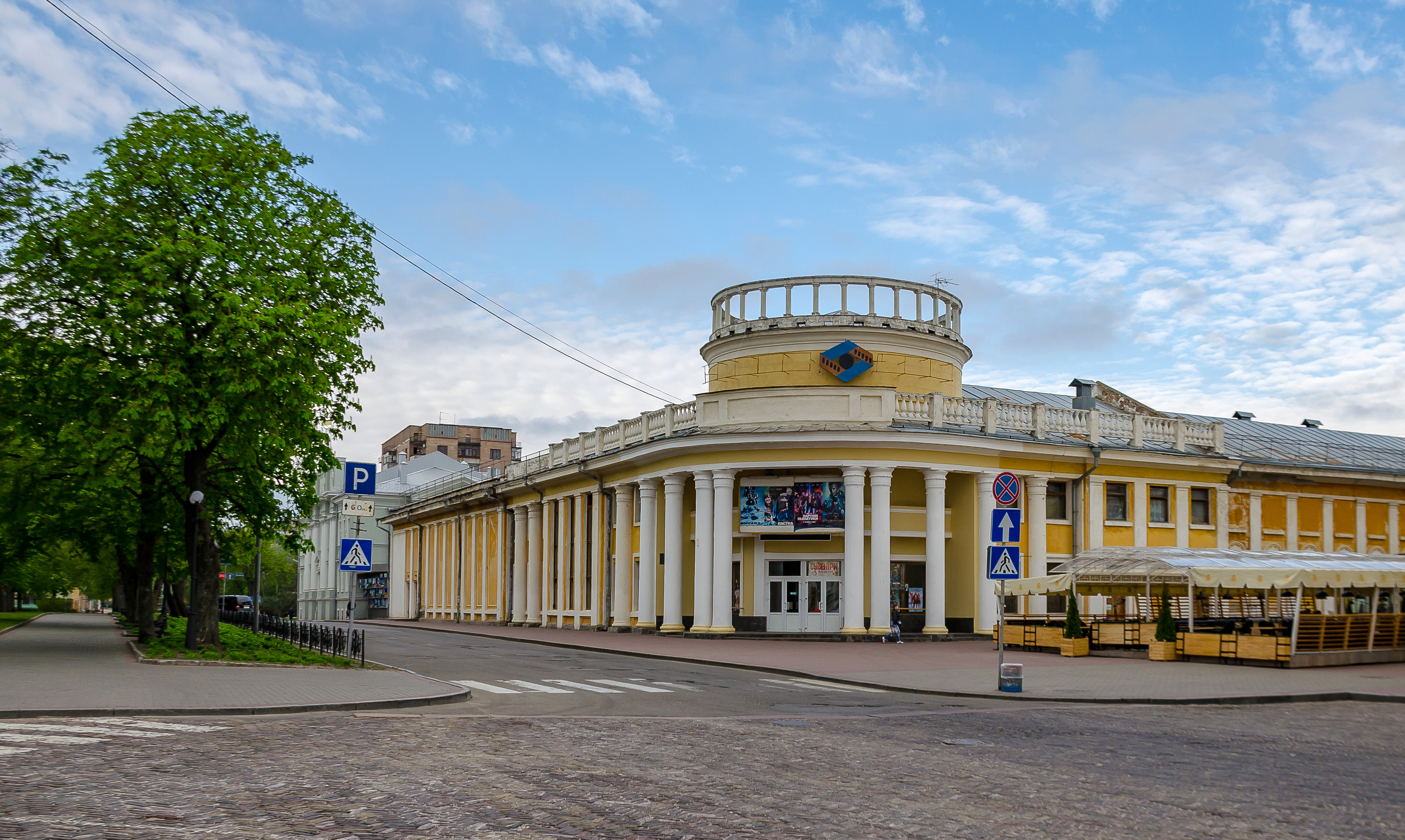

== Links ==
- chernigiv-rada.gov.ua
