= Krasna Square =

Square in Chernihiv, Ukraine

- Krasna Ploshcha
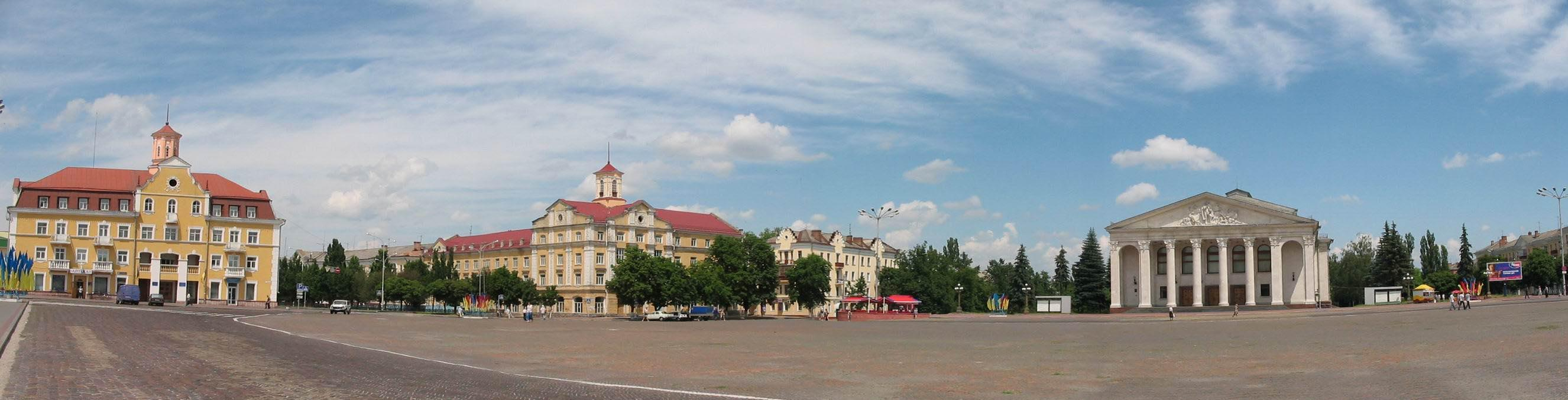
- Interactive map of Krasna Square
- Native name: Красна площа (Ukrainian)
- Former name: Kuibyshev Square
- Namesake: Old Slavic word for beauty
- Type: Square
- Location: Chernihiv, Ukraine
- Coordinates: 51°29′28″N 31°17′55″E

The Krasna Square (Ukrainian: Красна площа, romanized: Krasna ploshcha, lit. 'Beautiful Square') is the main public square located in the city of Chernihiv, Ukraine.

== History ==
From the Kievan Rus' era up until the 20th century, the square served as the city’s main trade center, featuring numerous stalls and small shops. Today, the square houses many cultural and administrative institutions, including the city's Opera and Drama Theatre.

According to archaeologists and historians, the location of the Suburbs, where the square has been found today, was the main bargain of the city in the time of Russia. Later, when Chernihiv, after the convenience of the orders, decreased in size, trade took place on the territory of the fortress, after its liquidation, in 1799, again moved to the area, which before the secularization in 1786 of the Pyatnytsya convent was referred to as Pyatnytske Pole.

In 1806, when the city square was erected on the territory of the new square according to the project of A. Kartashevsky, which marked the beginning of the relocation of the administrative center of the city to this district, the square was named Krasnaya. Later, after the appearance of an ensemble of trade rows during the 1810s and 20s, the original part of the square was given the name Bazarnaya (until 1910, the name Krasnaya Bazarnaya Square also appeared); the western part of the time of construction of the city theater in 1853 is designated as Theatrical.

In 1900, on the occasion of celebrating the thirtieth anniversary of the city government, the square was given back its name at the beginning of the 19th century - Krasna.

Before the beginning of Ukrainization in the mid-1920s, the name of the square was indicated in official sources in Russian. From 1923, the press "Red Square" (also known as "Red Square") began to appear in the press and in other sources, such as the city plan of 1930, which was aimed at maintaining the politically correct meaning of the translation of the name at that time.

The last name that is most common is Red Square. The origin of the word "red" is not from the color of the pavement, which the center has been covered since 1935, but from the Slavic adjective "red, which means beautiful." On the map of the city, dated 1930, you can find the name "Red Square" in Ukrainian. Locals are accustomed to calling the center by any of the above. Always in the same year after a major reconstruction of the square from which the city bazaar was removed, and in order to honor the memory of the late Bolshevik functionary V. Kuibyshev, the square was named after him. In December 1941, the square was named after Hetman I. Mazepa. Mazeppa Platz, and in the fall of 1943 the previous name was returned - Kuibyshev Square.The area where the square is located today has been the main market of the city since the times of Russia. Later, when Chernihiv after the destruction of the Tatar-Mongols significantly decreased in size, trade was conducted on the territory of the fortress, and after its liquidation, in 1799, again moved to the area, which at that time was referred to as the Friday Field; later the area was named Bazarnaya, then - Krasnaya. From the middle of the 19th century. part of the square was designated as Theatrical.At the beginning of the 19th century on the square built shopping malls with colonnades-galleries, in which local merchants opened their shops. The shopping malls were dismantled in the first half of the 1930s, and in 1935 the square, like all the main streets of the city before that, was paved with red and yellow clinker, and a square was laid out near the Friday Church. In 1959, the Chernihiv Regional Academic Ukrainian Music and Drama Theater named after Taras Shevchenko was opened on the square.

On July 16, 1990, the Executive Committee of the Chernihiv Workers' Deputies adopted a decision № 195, according to which the work of the advisory commission of historians and local historians (and on the basis of its conclusions and recommendations) renamed the area to Krasna to determine the etymology of the name yansky red, that is - beautiful.

During the Christmas time, the area is decorated with a large Christmas tree and an ice rink for skating.

== Buildings ==
At the beginning of the 19th century, shopping malls with colonnades-galleries were built on the square, where local merchants opened their shops. Local historian Felix Spiridonov found the following description of one of the shops, made in 1841:

"The store was brick. Outside - a neat building, decorated with a portal with four columns. The roof under the iron, painted with oil paint. The floor and walls are wooden, under the floor there is a vaulted brick cellar - for storing goods. Iron bars on the windows. The two windows that adorned the facade had a kind of blinds made by local craftsmen in the smithy. The shopping malls were dismantled in the first half of the 1930s, and in 1935 the square, like all the main streets of the city before, was paved with red and yellow clinker, and a square was laid out near the Friday Church.

In 1959, the Chernihiv Regional Academic Ukrainian Music and Drama Theater named after Taras Shevchenko was opened on the square.

In the summer of 2019, the square was reconstructed - the old pavement was removed and moved, leaving only whole bricks, which then paved the central pedestrian part of the square. Lanes and bike lanes were paved with new bricks. The water supply and sewerage collector were replaced on the territory of the square, archeological researches were carried out. The cost of the reconstruction was 53 million hryvnias.

== Attractions ==
- Myru Avenue
- Soviet warriors common grave
- Chernihiv City Council
- Shchors cinema in Chernihiv
- Hotel Desna
- Opera and Drama Theatre, designed by Semyon Fridlin
- Statue to the Chernobyl Disaster
- Chernihiv Governorate Zemstvo building

== Gallery ==
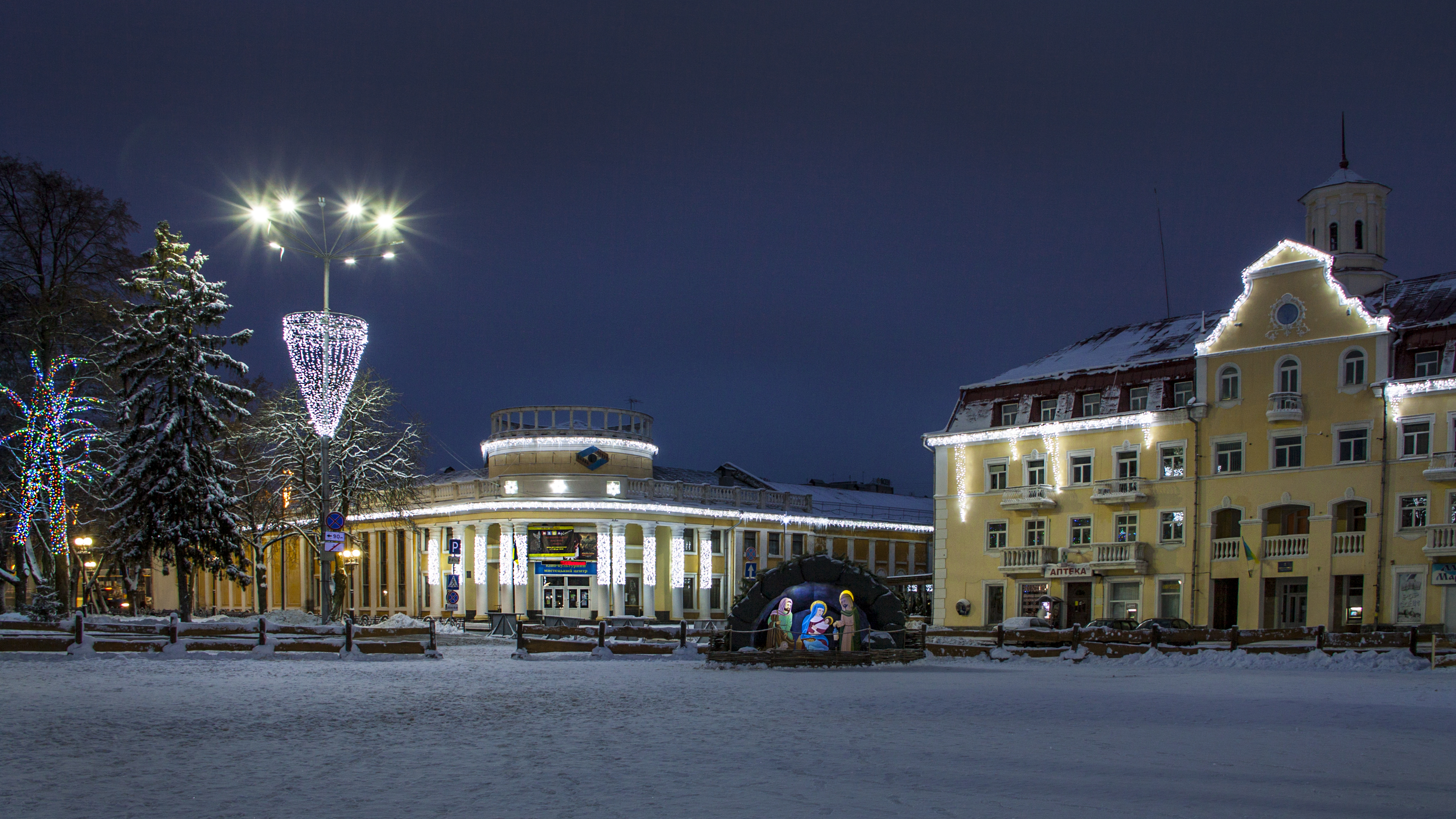
Krasna Square snowed during the Xmas time

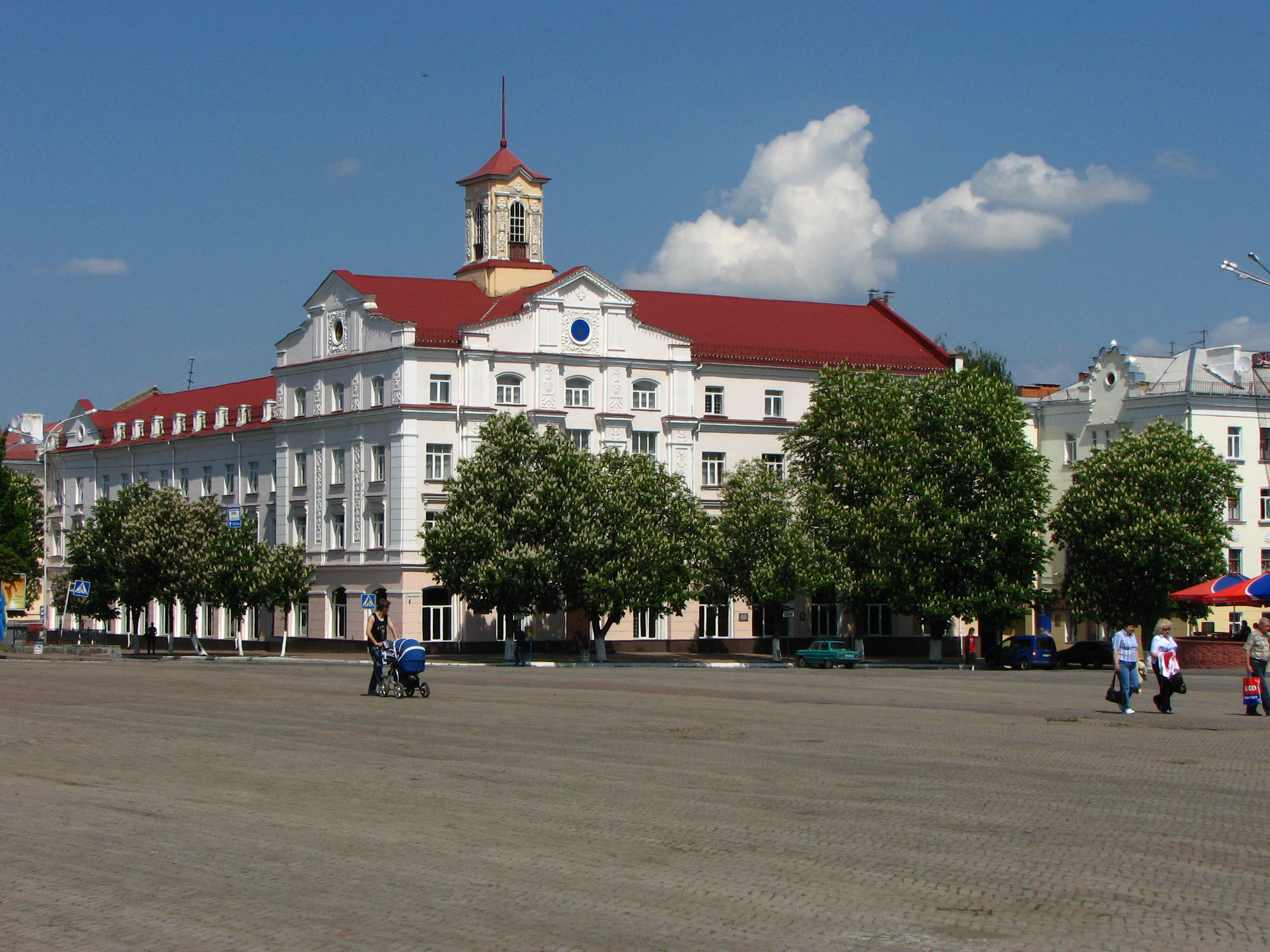

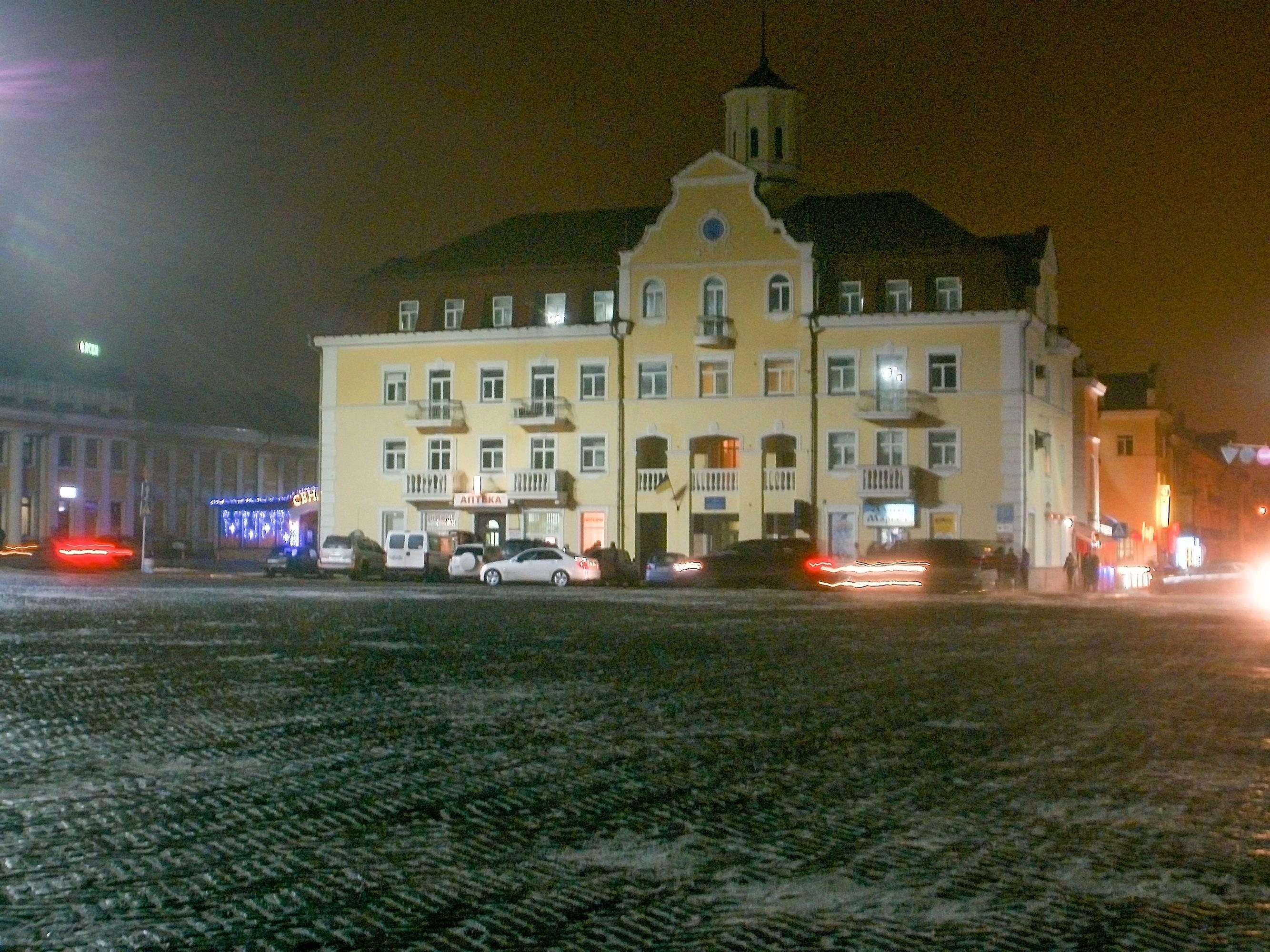

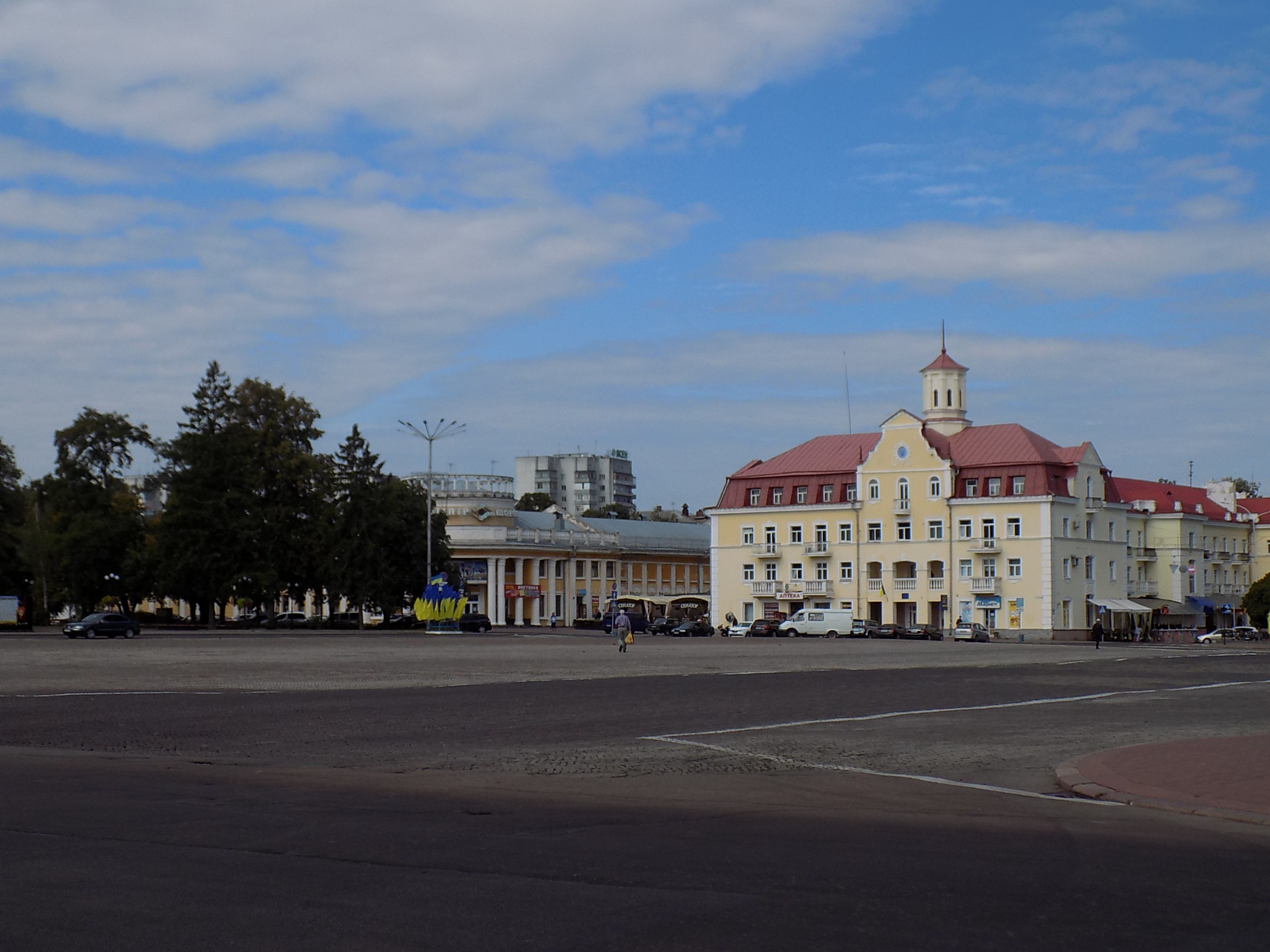
Hotel Desna

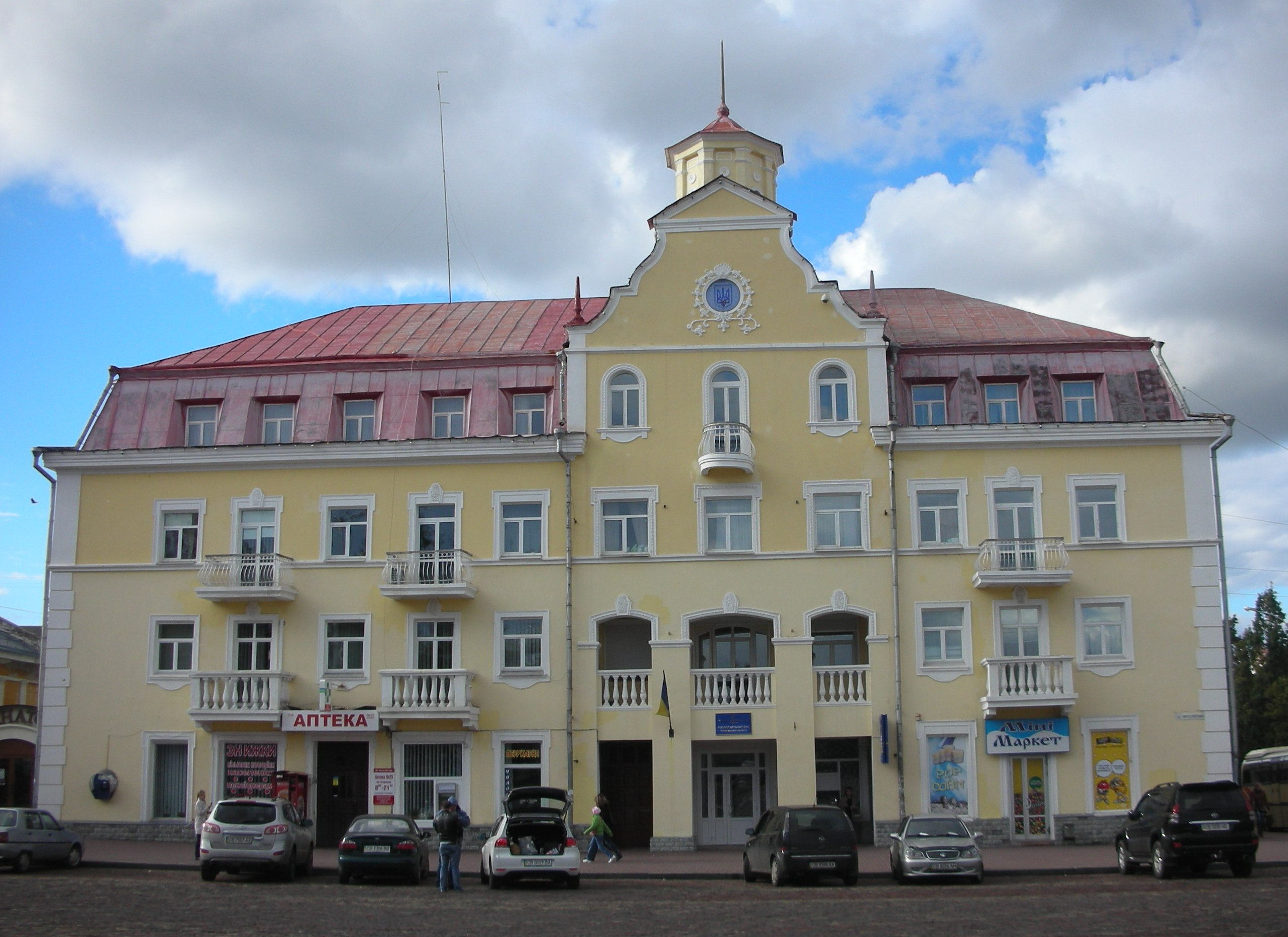
Hotel Desna

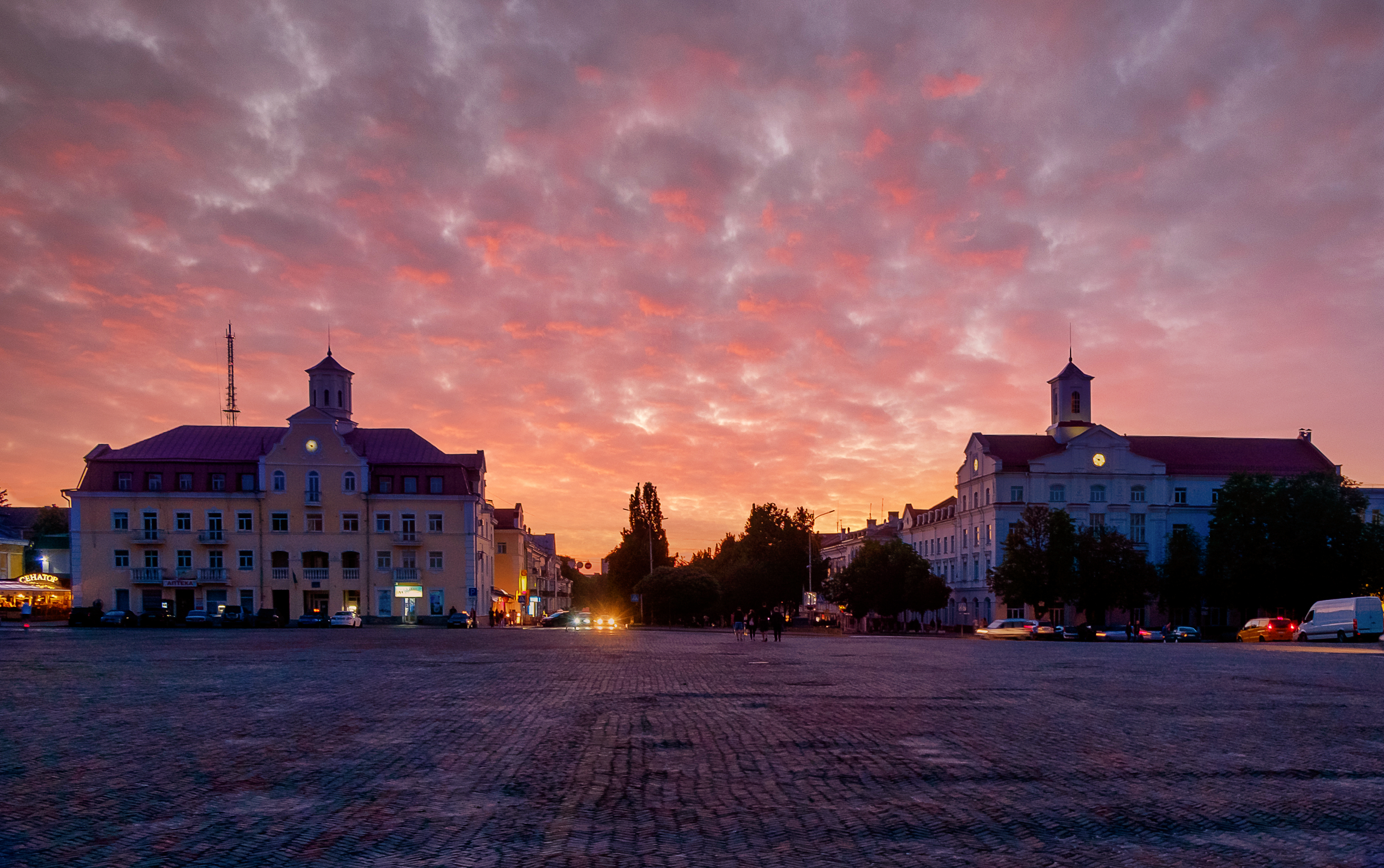

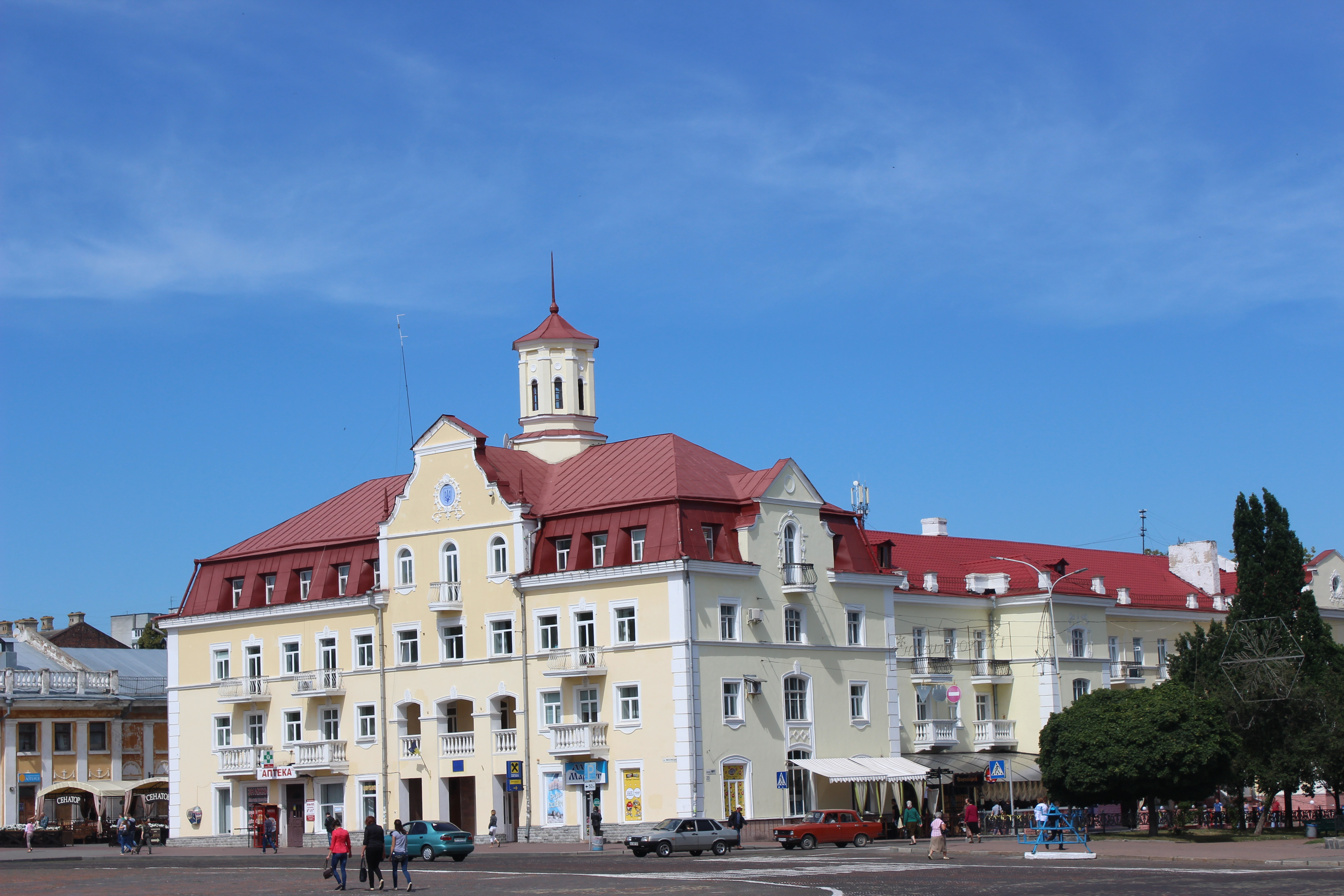

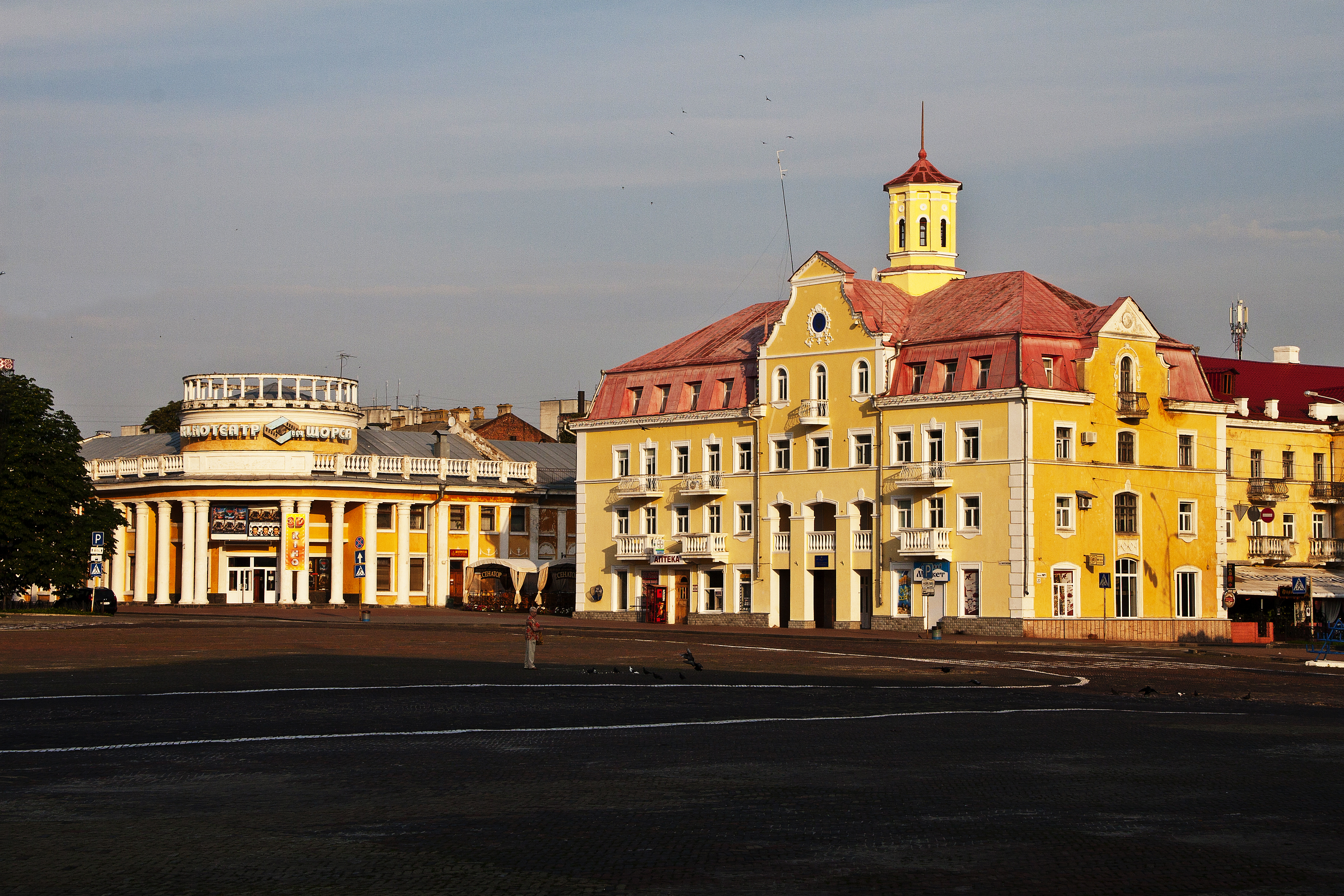

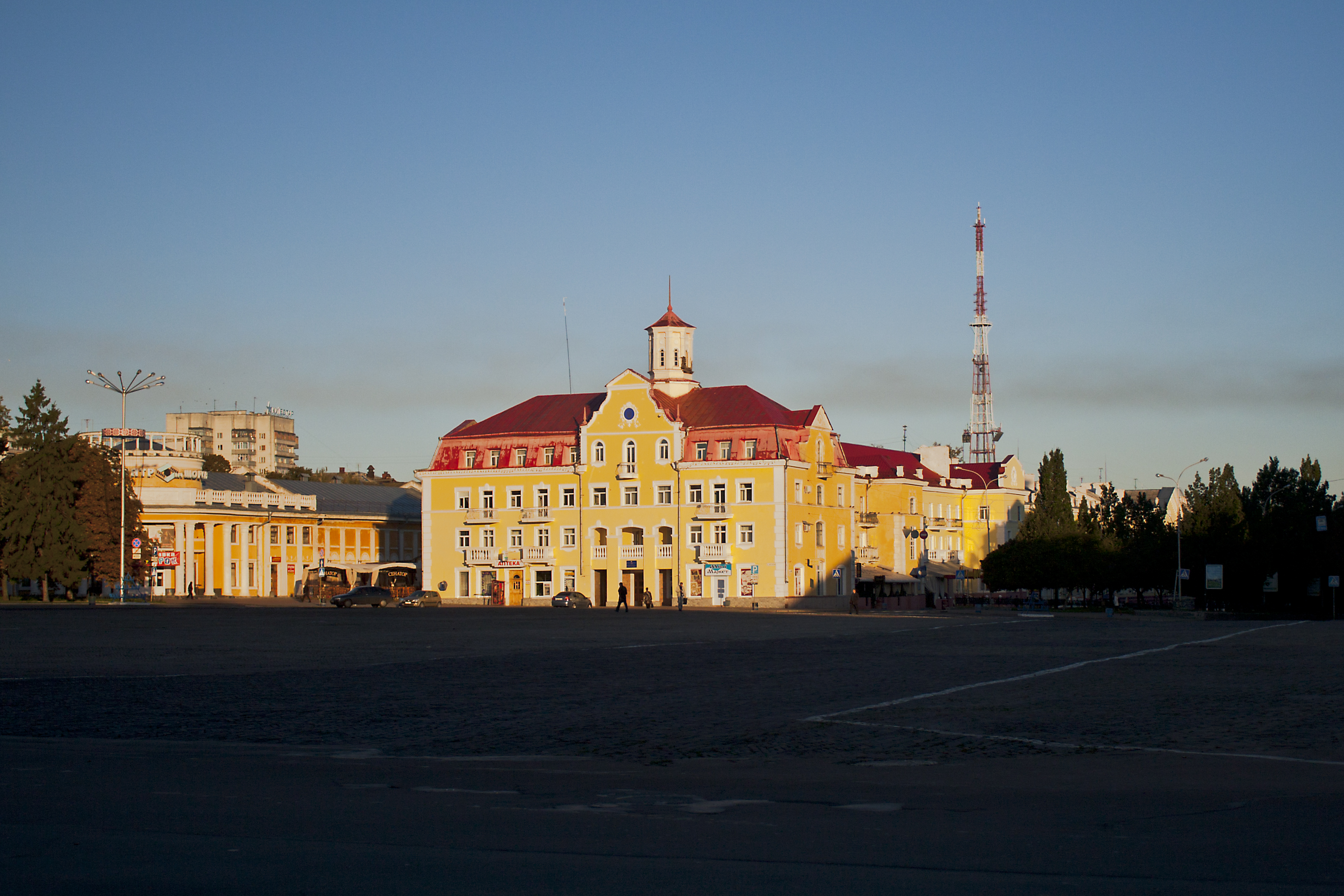

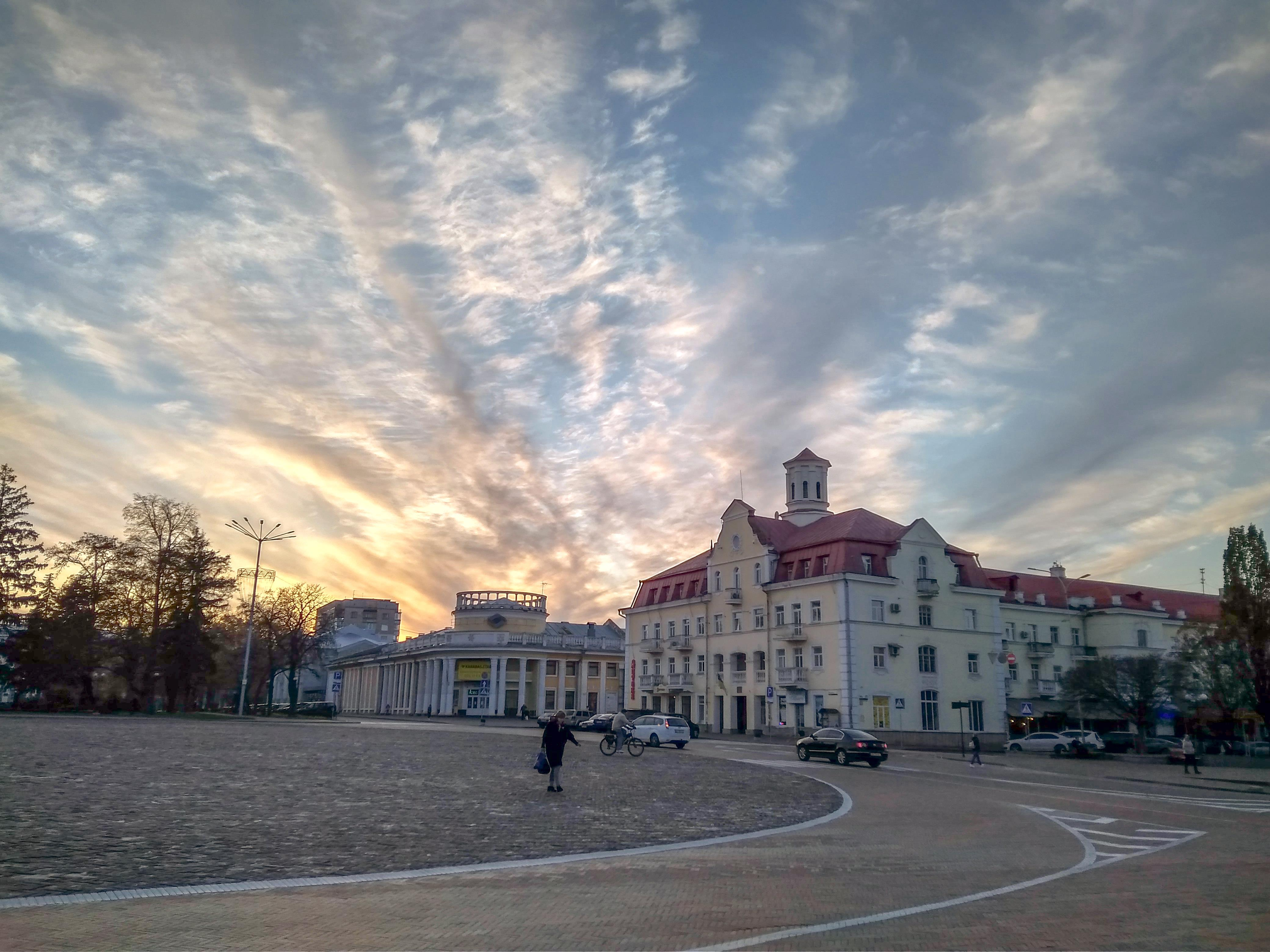

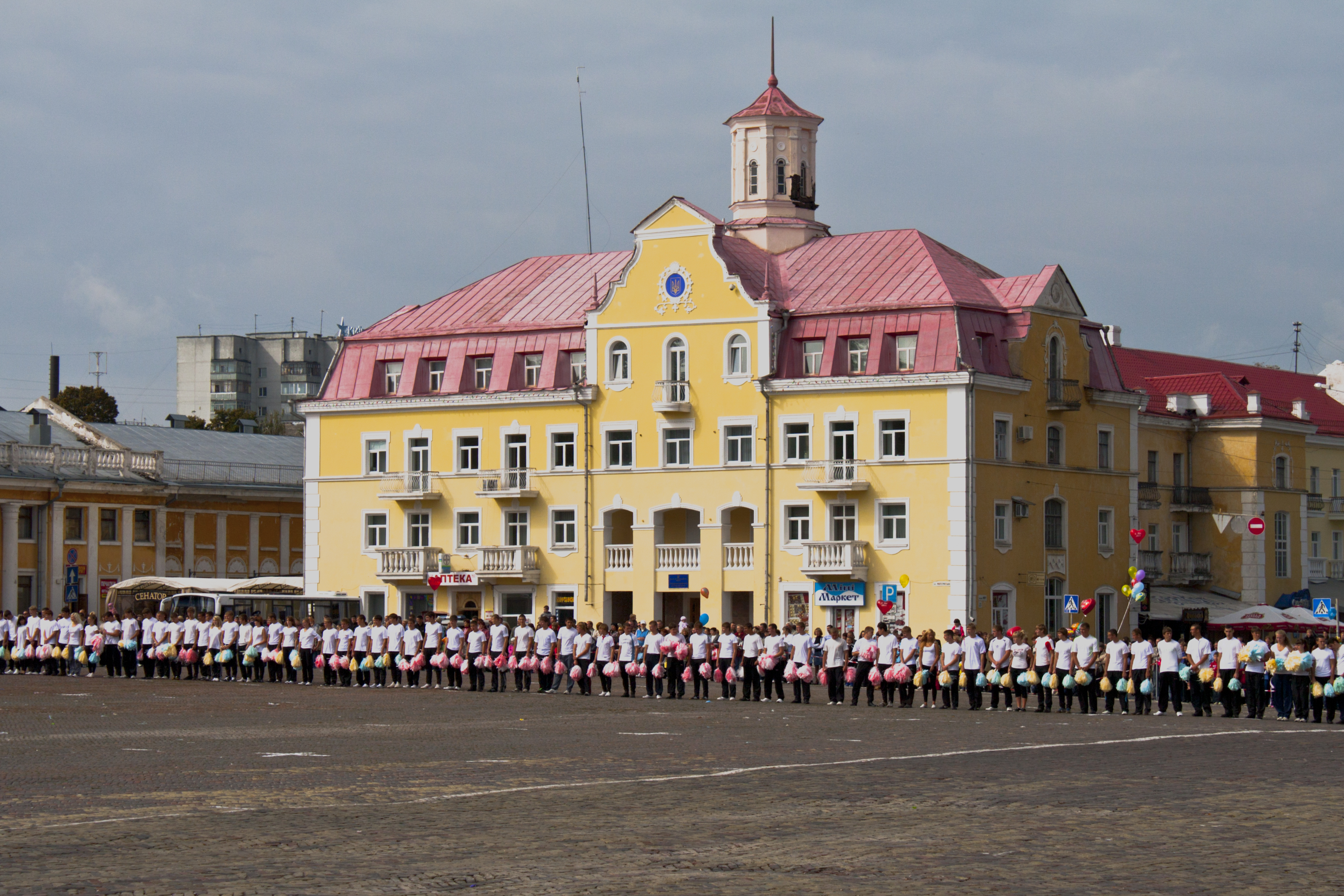

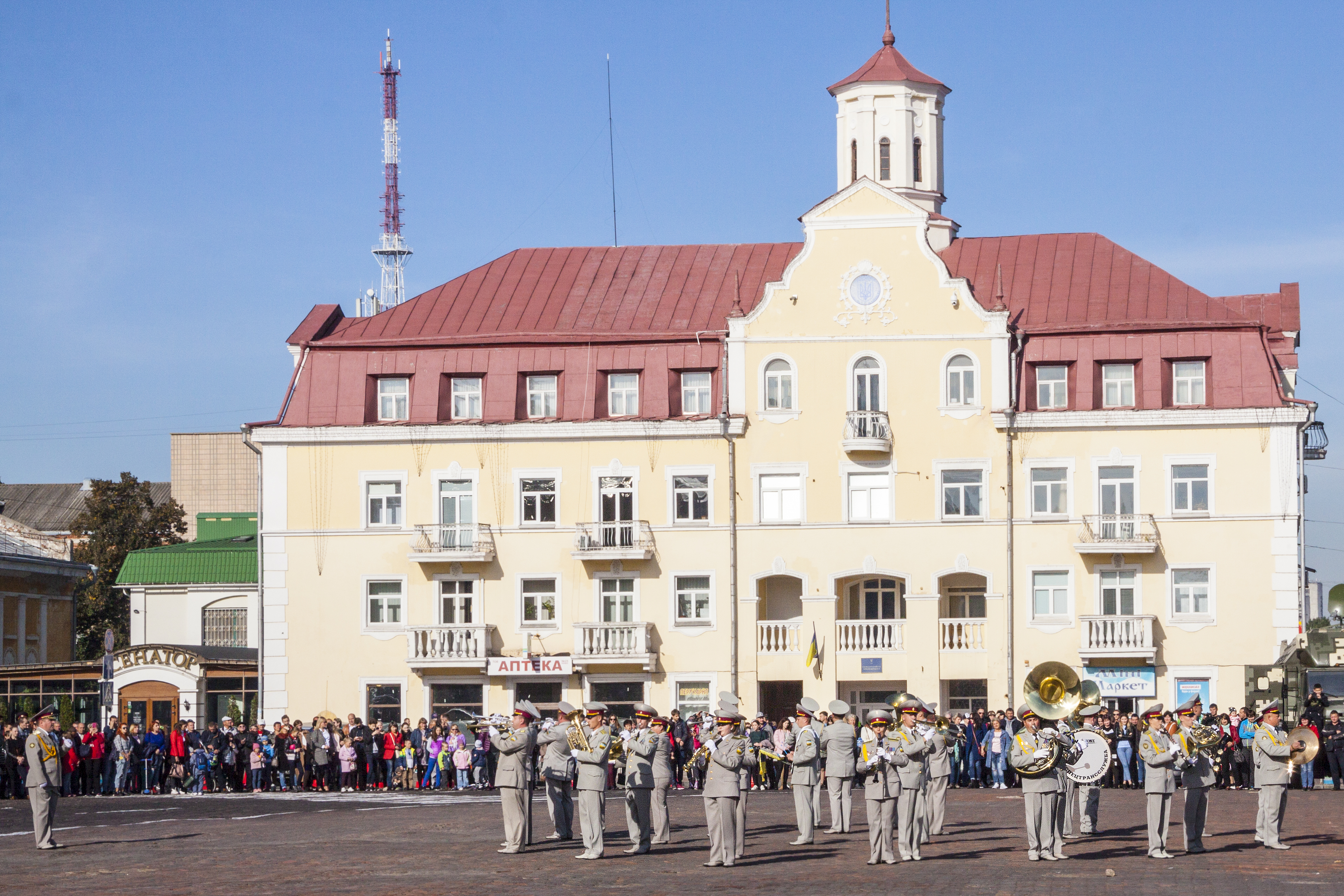

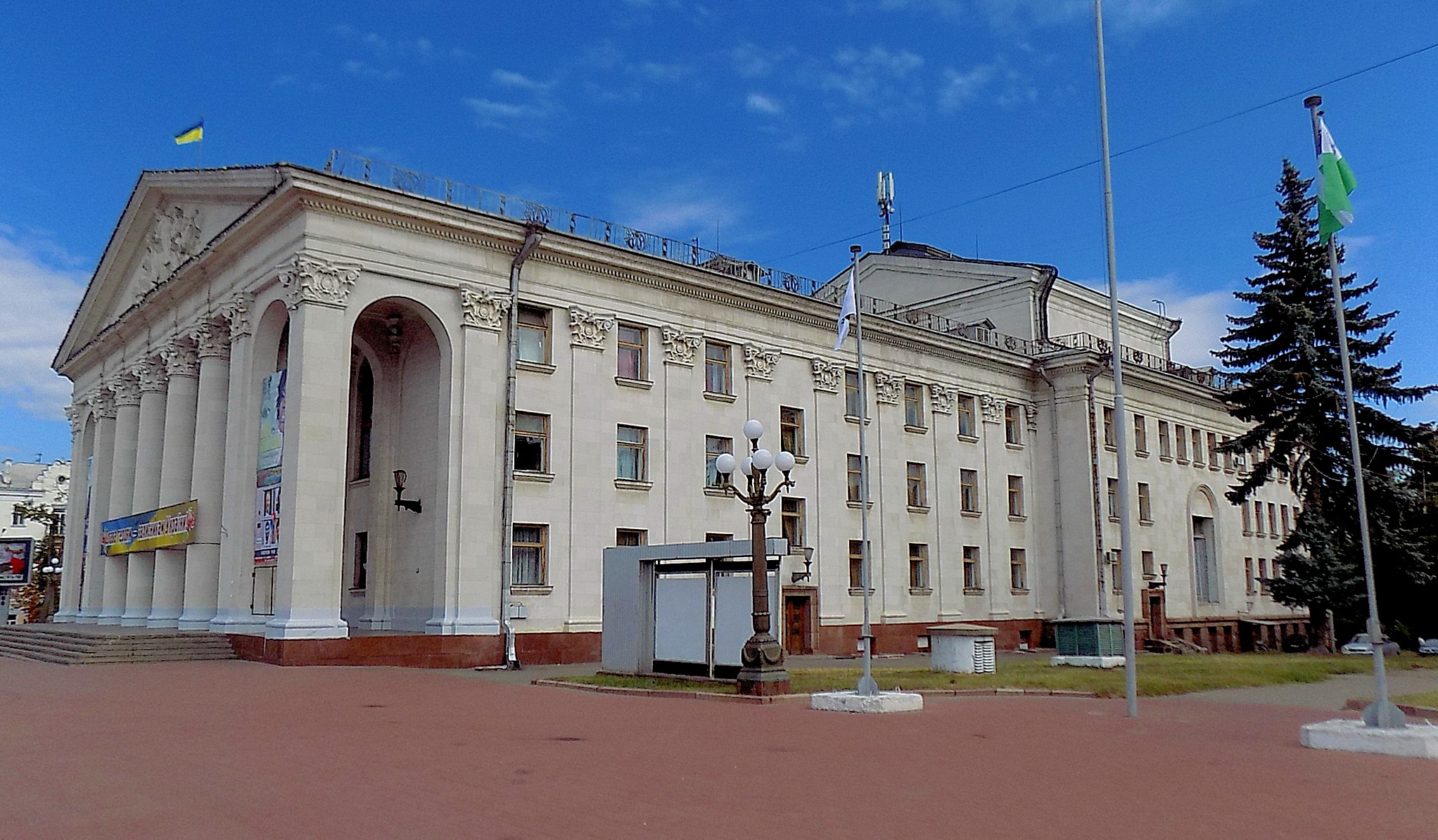

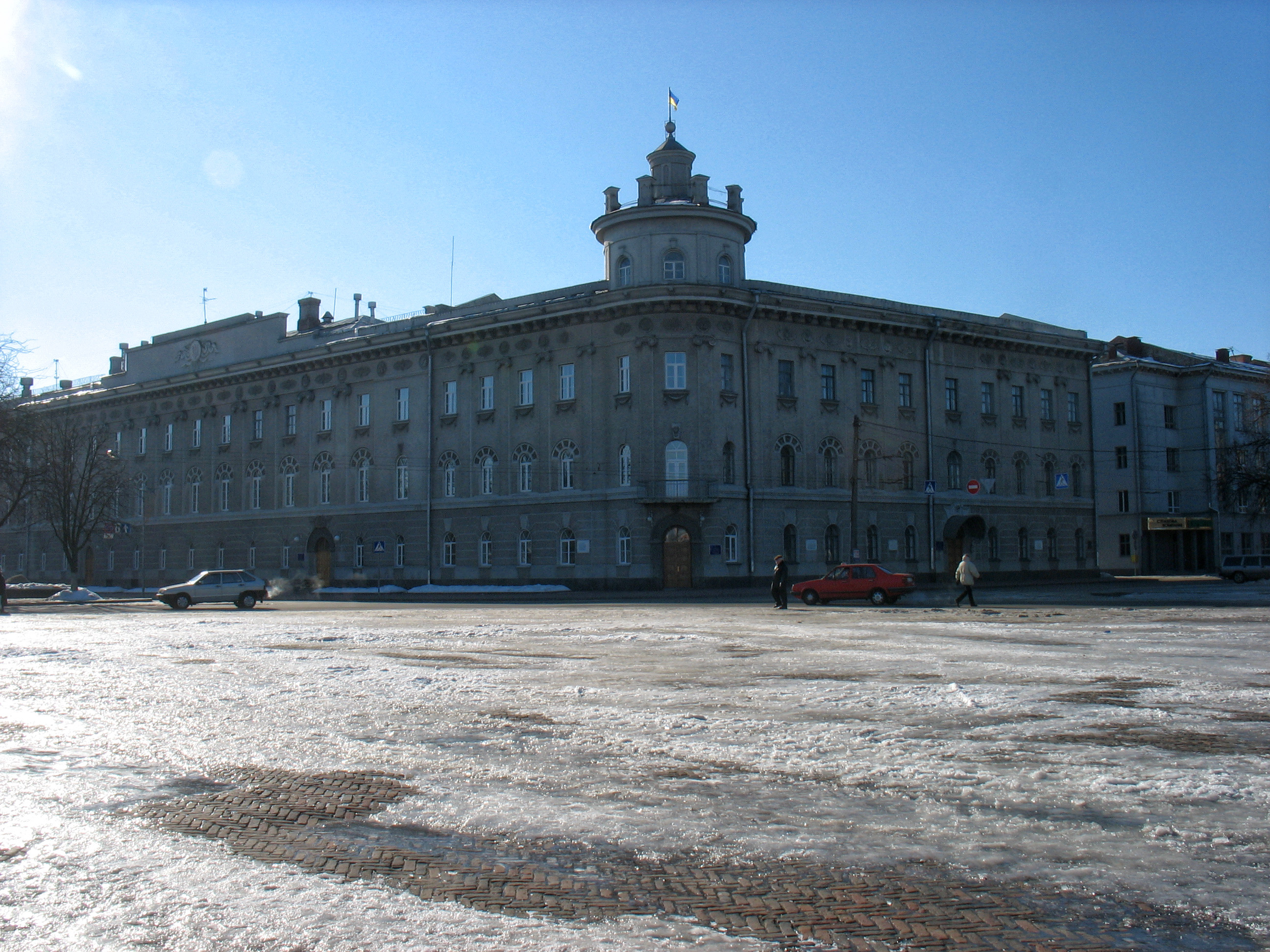

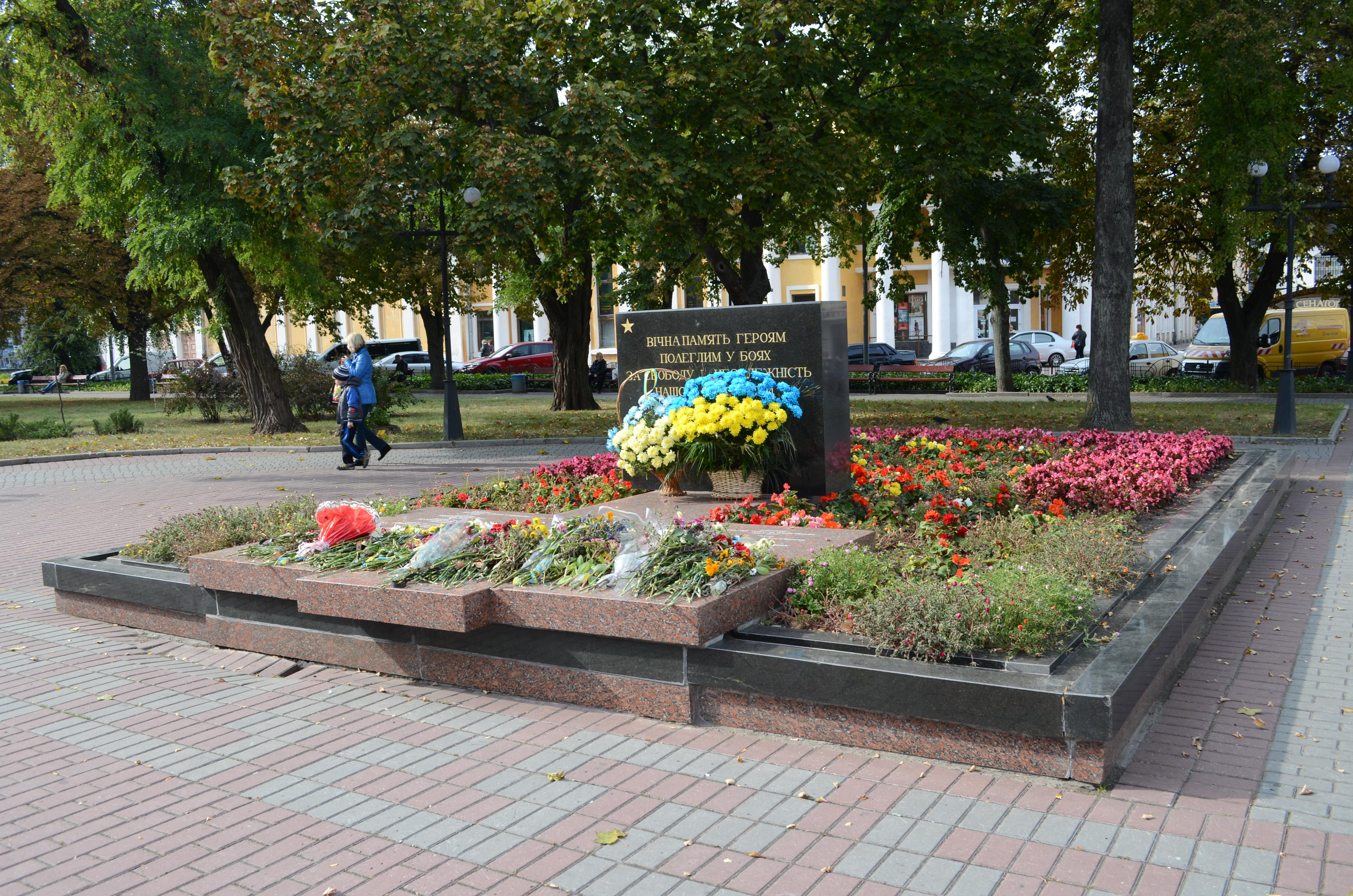
Mass grave of Red Army soldiers in Chernihiv

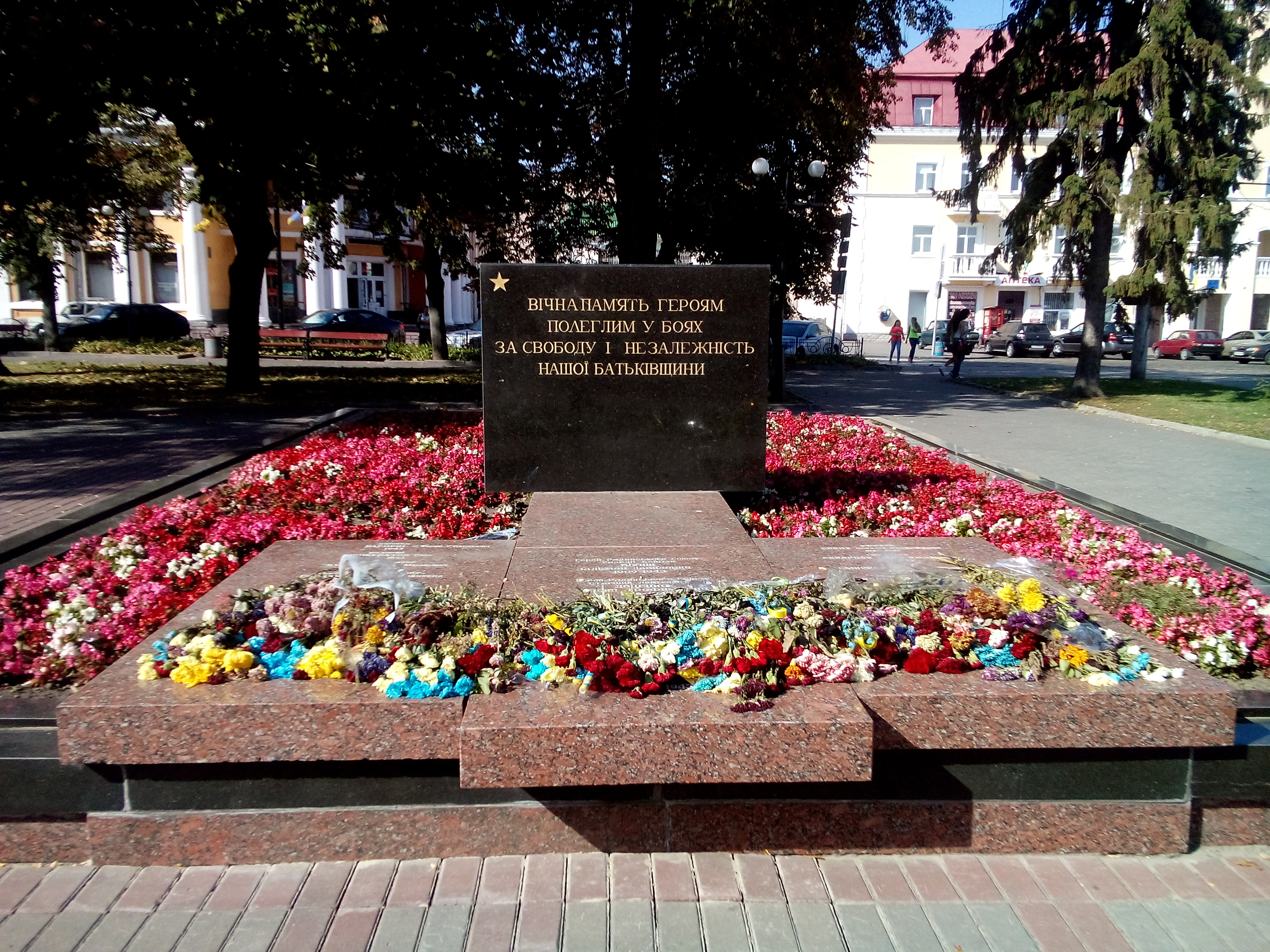
Mass grave of Red Army soldiers in Chernihiv

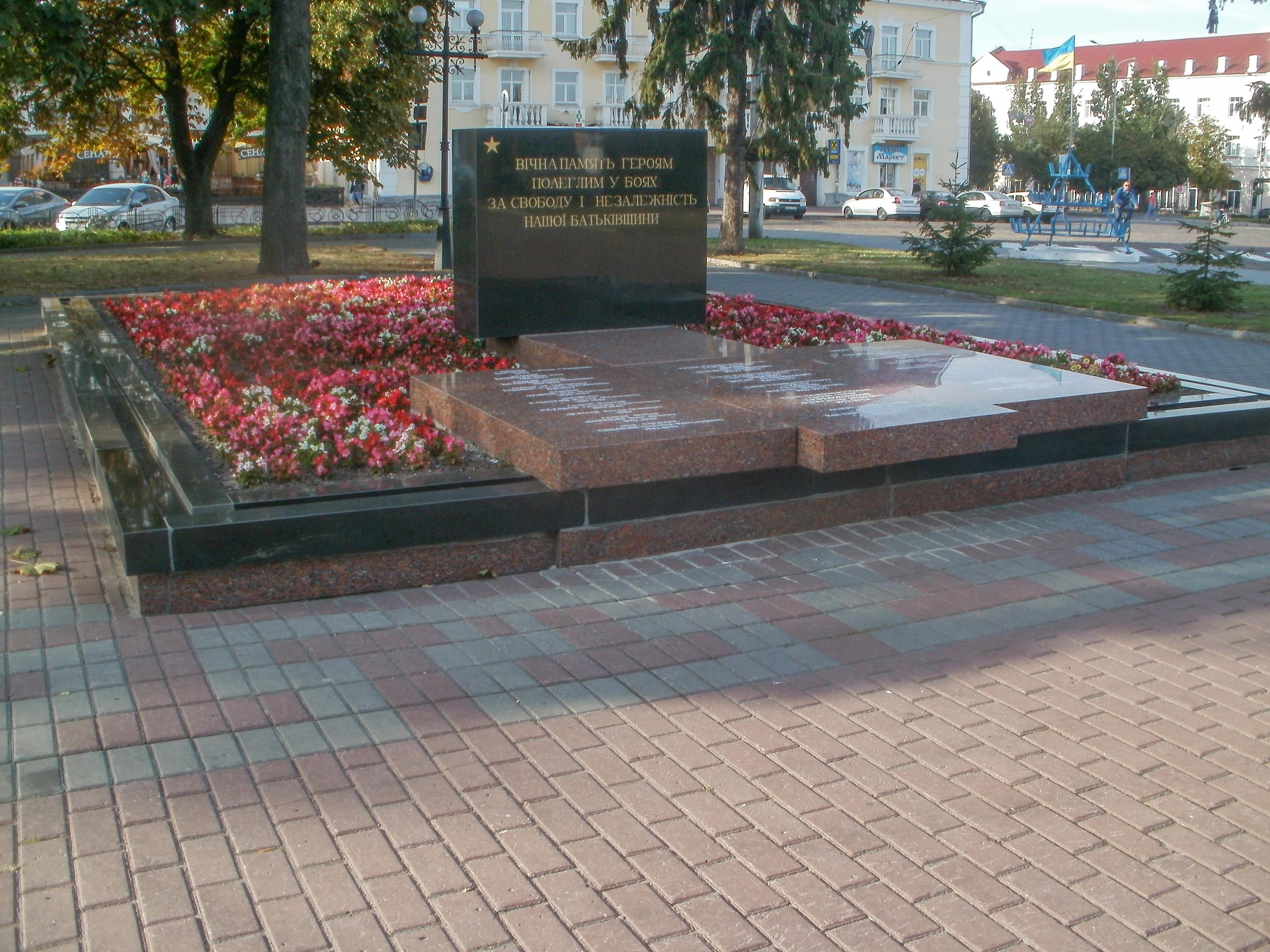
Mass grave of Red Army soldiers in Chernihiv

== See also ==
- List of streets and squares in Chernihiv
