= Pavlovsk Park =

Park near Saint Petersburg, Russia

Coordinates: 59°41′40″N 30°27′48″E

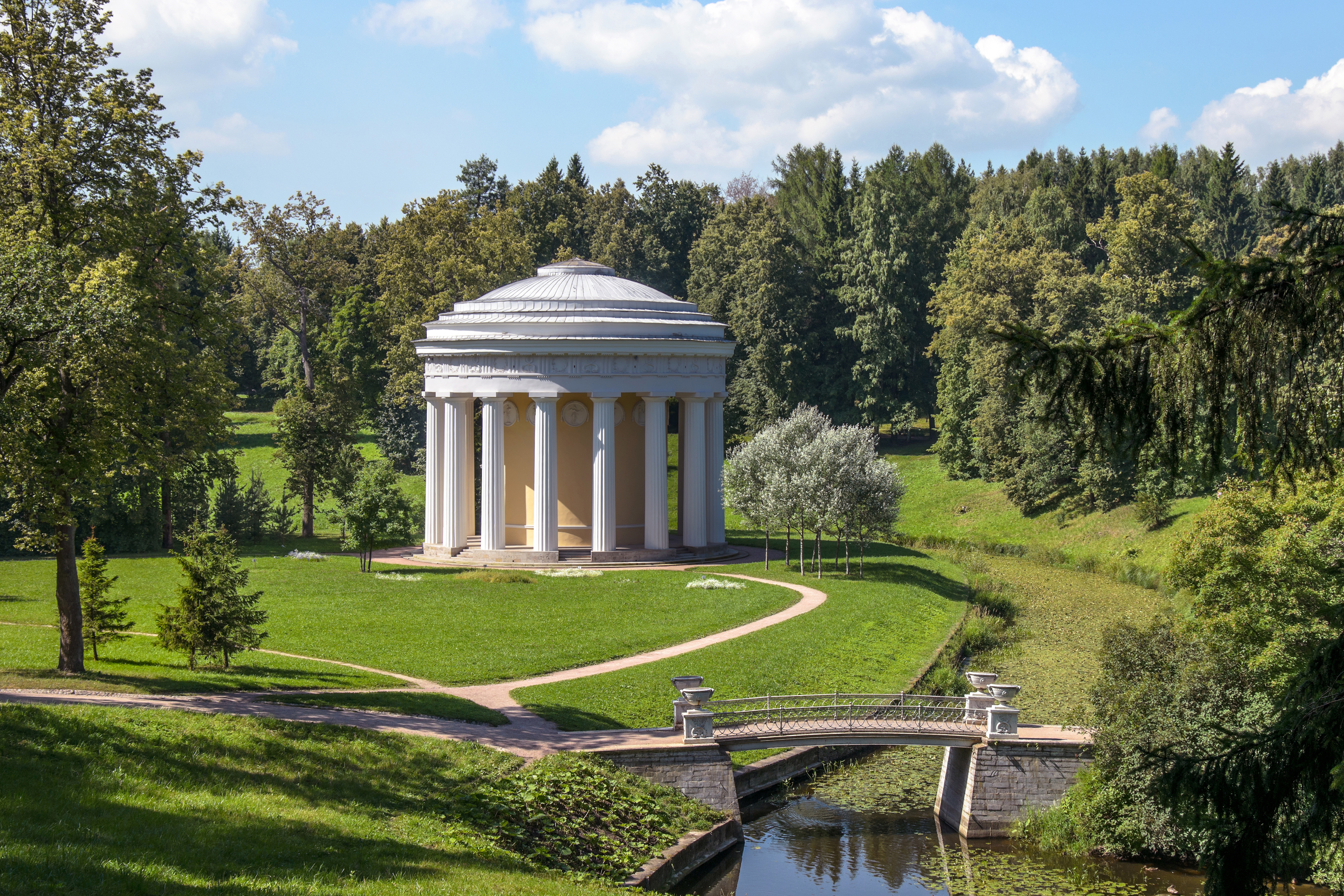
The "Temple of Friendship" in Pavlovsk Park (1780)

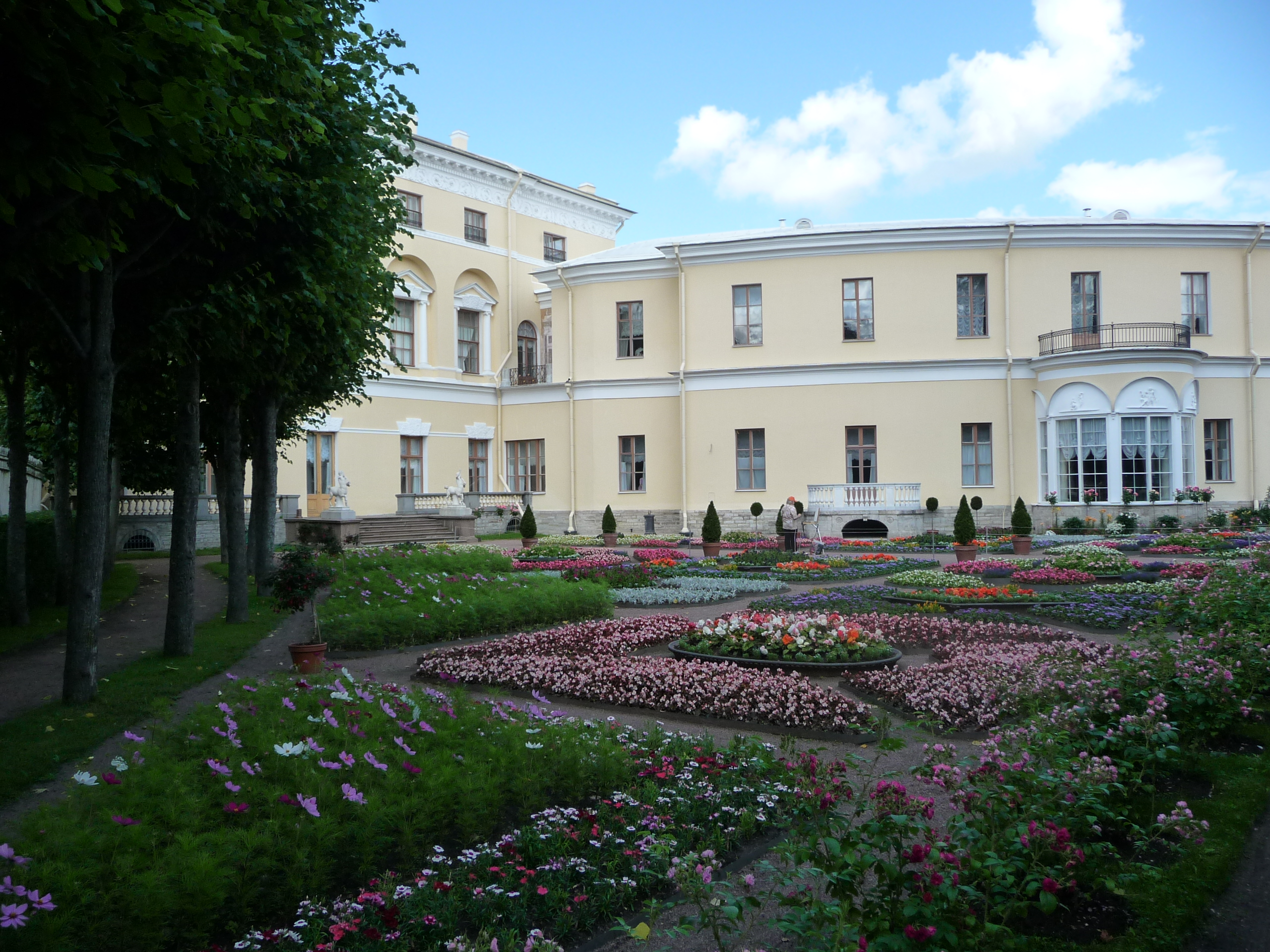
The private garden of Maria Feodorovna. The windows of her private apartment overlooking the garden are visible in the background.

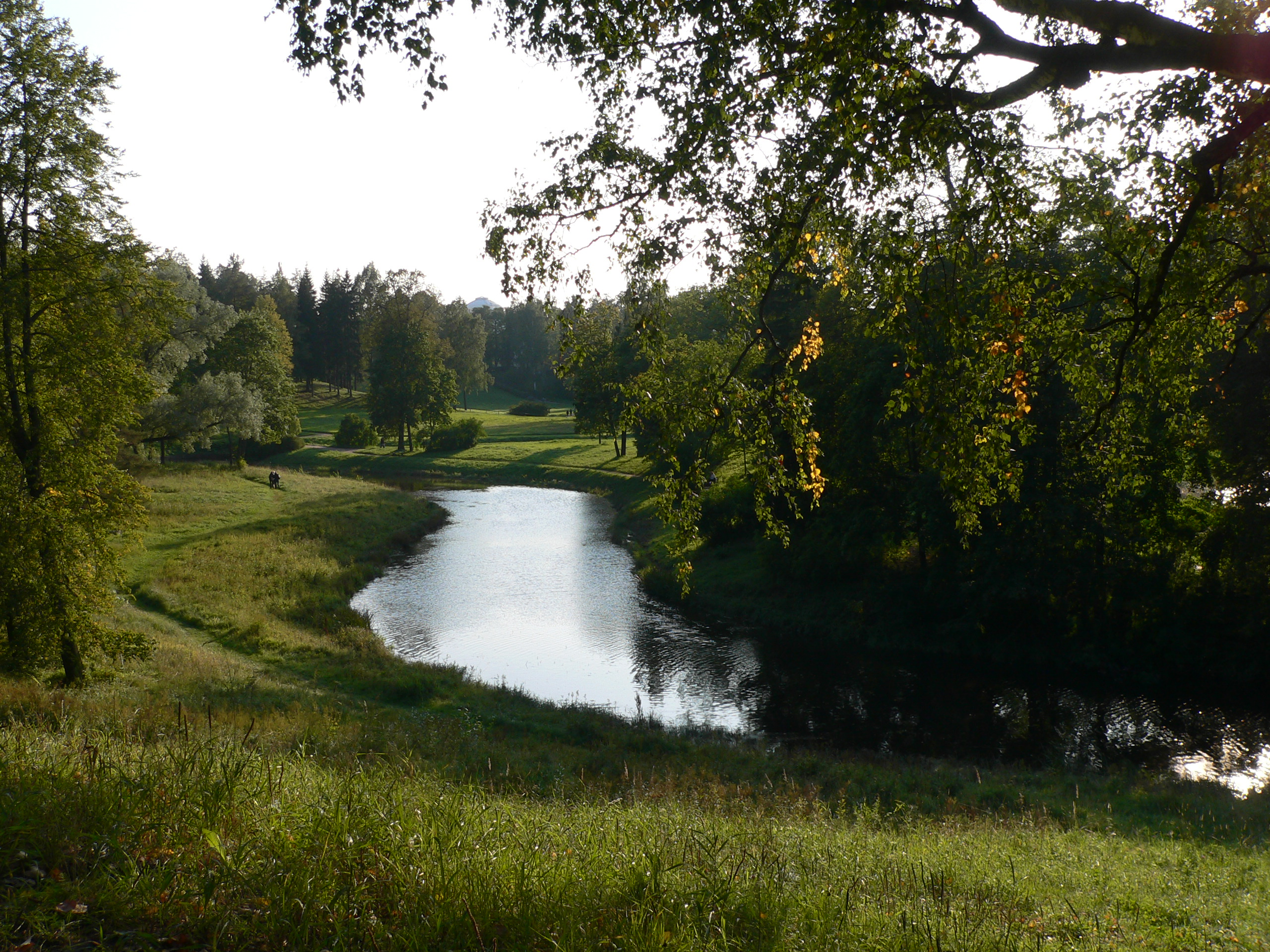
The Slavyanka River in Pavlovsk Park in autumn

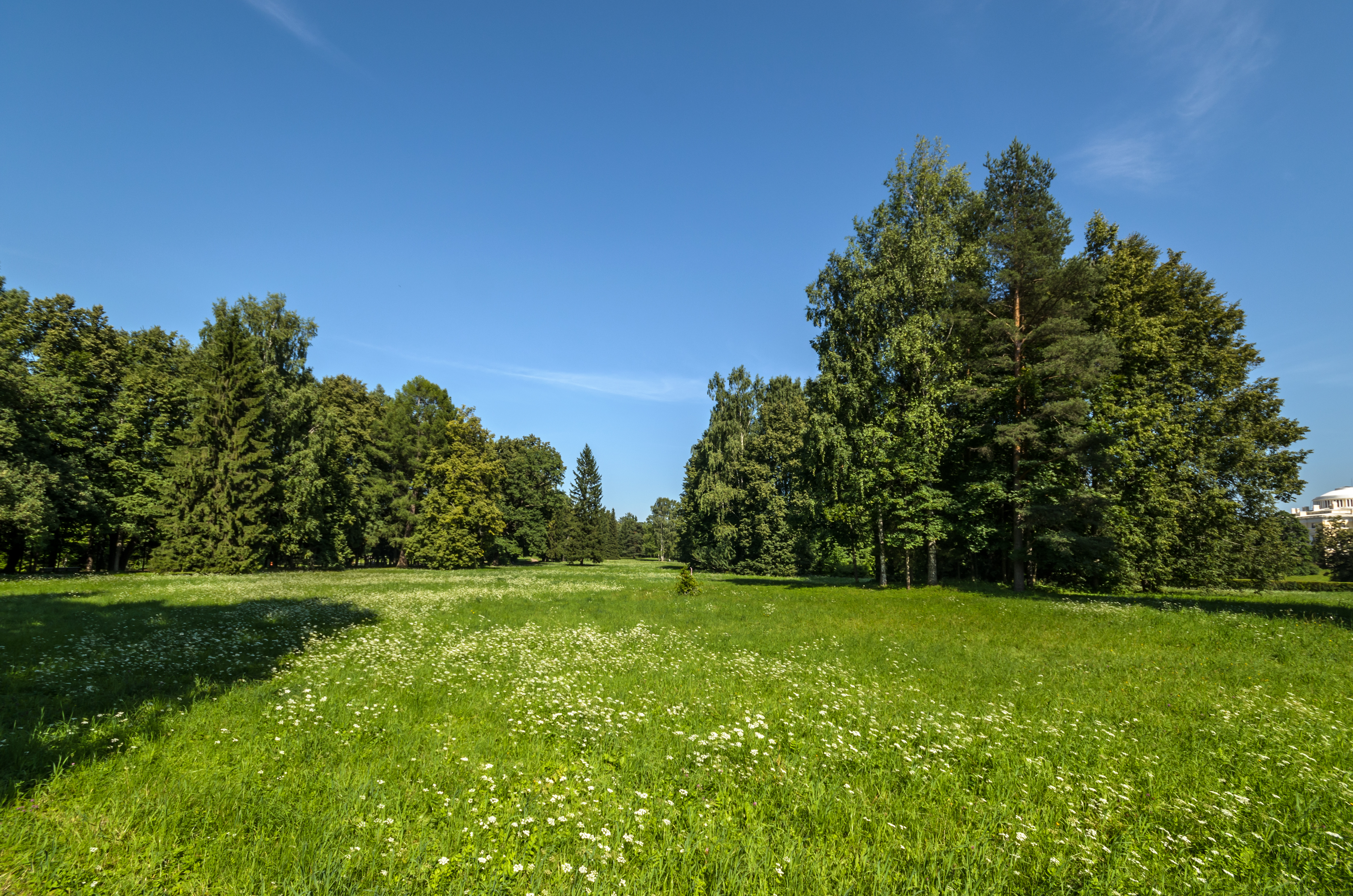
Pavlovsk Park in summer

The Pavlovsk Park (Russian: Павловский парк) is the park surrounding the Pavlovsk Palace, an 18th-century Russian Imperial residence built by Tsar Paul I of Russia near Saint Petersburg. After his death, it became the home of his widow, Maria Feodorovna. It is now a state museum and a public park.

== Design and conception ==
The park was conceived by the Scottish architect Charles Cameron as a classic English landscape garden, an idealized landscape filled with picturesque pieces of classical architecture, designed to surprise and please the viewer.

Its inspiration lay not in England but in continental gardens that Maria Feodorovna and her husband had seen in a tour of western Europe in 1782, during which they travelled incognito as the "Count and Countess du Nord". They visited her family's park at Württemberg, where Maria Feodorovna had grown up, and were impressed by the Petit Trianon in the grounds of the Palace of Versailles in France. The deepest impression, however, was made by the Château de Chantilly and especially by the hameau or mock-rustic hamlet built on the Chantilly estate by the Prince of Condé. Paul told the Prince that he would give all he had for Chantilly, and years later, when Cameron was laying out the Pavlovsk Park, features from Chantilly and Württemberg were reproduced to give Paul and Maria Feodorovna their own versions of their favourite elements of those parks.

Cameron laid out a triple alley of five straight rows of linden trees, imported from Lübeck, in a long axis from the courtyard of the Palace, leading to a small semi-circular place in the forest. This served as a parade ground for Tsar Paul's Imperial guards. In the forest to the left of this axis he placed a romantic thatch-roofed dairy with stalls for several cows modeled after the one in the park of Württemberg; and on the other side of the parade route, an aviary, filled with parakeets, nightingales, starlings, and quail. This part of the garden also included a labyrinth, and picturesque tombstones imported from Italy. An early French visitor described the effect of this part of the garden: "Melancholy consumes the soul when you arrive...then the pain is followed by pleasure."

Marie Feodorovna was deeply interested in botany. In 1801, Cameron constructed an elegant flower garden behind the Palace, just outside the windows of the private apartment of Marie Feodorovna. Next to the garden was a Greek temple containing a statue of the Three Graces, looking down at the river. She imported flowers from Holland for her garden, including hyacinth, tulips, daffodils and narcissus. She also constructed an orangery and several greenhouses where she grew apricots, cherries, peaches, grapes and pineapples.

The River Slavyanka was the picturesque axis of the composition, with winding paths along the river providing changing views to the visitor. A dam turned the river into a picturesque pond in the valley below the Palace. In 1780, Cameron constructed a large Roman temple at a turn in the river in the bottom of the valley. The classical temple, similar to the Temple of Pan in the gardens at Stowe House in England. It was originally called the Temple of Gratitude, dedicated to Catherine the Great, who had donated the land for the Park, but in 1780 it was renamed the Temple of Friendship, in honor of the visit to Pavlovsk of Joseph II, Holy Roman Emperor.

Between 1780 and 1783, at the top of the hill which descended to the lake, Cameron constructed a colonnade with a copy of the Apollo Belvedere in Rome.

== 19th century ==
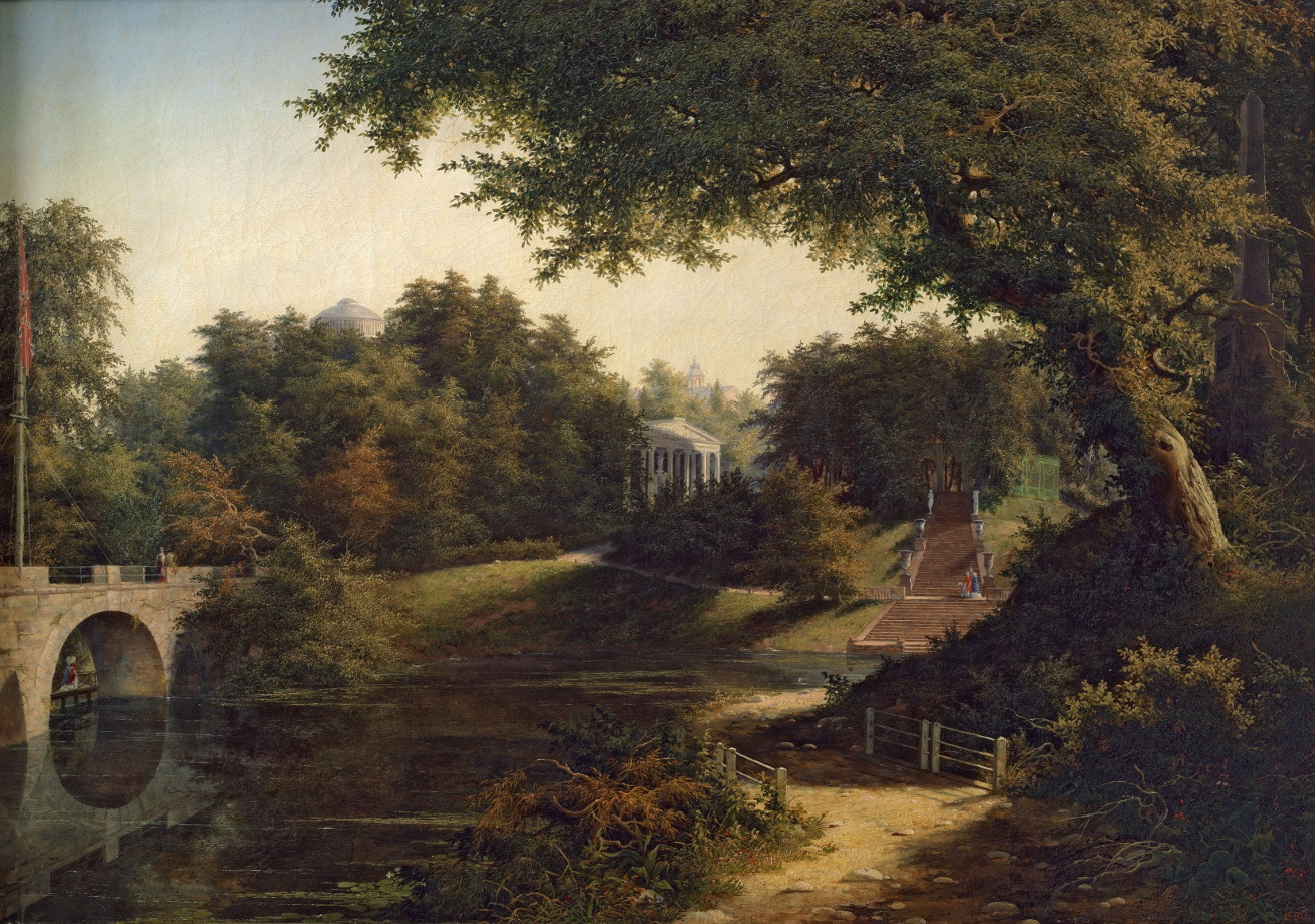
Pavlovsk Park in 1845; by Alexey Voloskov. The Pavilion of the "Three Graces" can be seen in the background.

By the early 19th century, the Park at Pavlovsk had gardens representing many different styles. A formal and geometric garden à la française was planted near the Palace. An Italian garden, with parterres, classical statues and a grand staircase was created by Brenna on the hillside overlooking the lake. Cameron used the intimate Dutch style for the little private garden outside Maria Feodorovna's private apartments, and the huge park was in the style of the English and French landscape garden.

An English visitor, John Lowden, who saw Pavlovsk during the war against Napoleon in 1812, wrote that Pavlovsk Park was the most beautiful example of the English landscape garden in all of the Russian Empire.

Beginning in 1792, the chief architect of the Pavlovsk Park was the Italian landscape architect and painter, Pietro Gonzaga, who had begun his career as a set designer at the La Scala Theater in Milan. Gonzaga always remained a theater designer; he designed the funeral procession of Catherine the Great, Paul I, and Alexander I. as well as the Coronations of Paul I, Alexander I and Nicholas I. For Cameron he painted landscape scenes of the Pavlovsk Park on the walls and ceilings of rooms of the Palace, and he designed spectacular sets for the 1814 ceremony at Pavlovsk welcoming Alexander I home after his victory over Napoleon.

Gonzaga planned the landscape of Pavlovsk Park with meticulous care, marking the trees to be saved or cut down. He laid out paths and changed contours to create the effects he wanted, using open and closed spaces and different colors and shapes of trees to make theatrical scenes. He made dramatic use of the contrast between the white bark and light leaves of birch trees and the dark needles of red-brown trunks of pine trees, setting groups of birch trees in front of dark backgrounds of pines. He also made decorative use of the different seasons in the Park, painting scenes with brilliant colors of the autumn leaves. Gonzaga was the architect of Pavlovsk Park until his death in 1831 at the age of eighty.

== Bibliography ==
- Orloff, Alexandre and Chvidkovski, Dimitri, Saint-Petersbourg- l'architecture des tsars, Editions Place des Victoires, Paris 1995, translated from Russian to French by Brigitte de Monclos, ISBN 2-84459-025-X
- Massie, Suzanne, Pavlovsk: The Life of a Russian Palace, Hodder & Stoughton,1990, ISBN 0-340-48790-9.
