= English landscape garden =

Style of garden

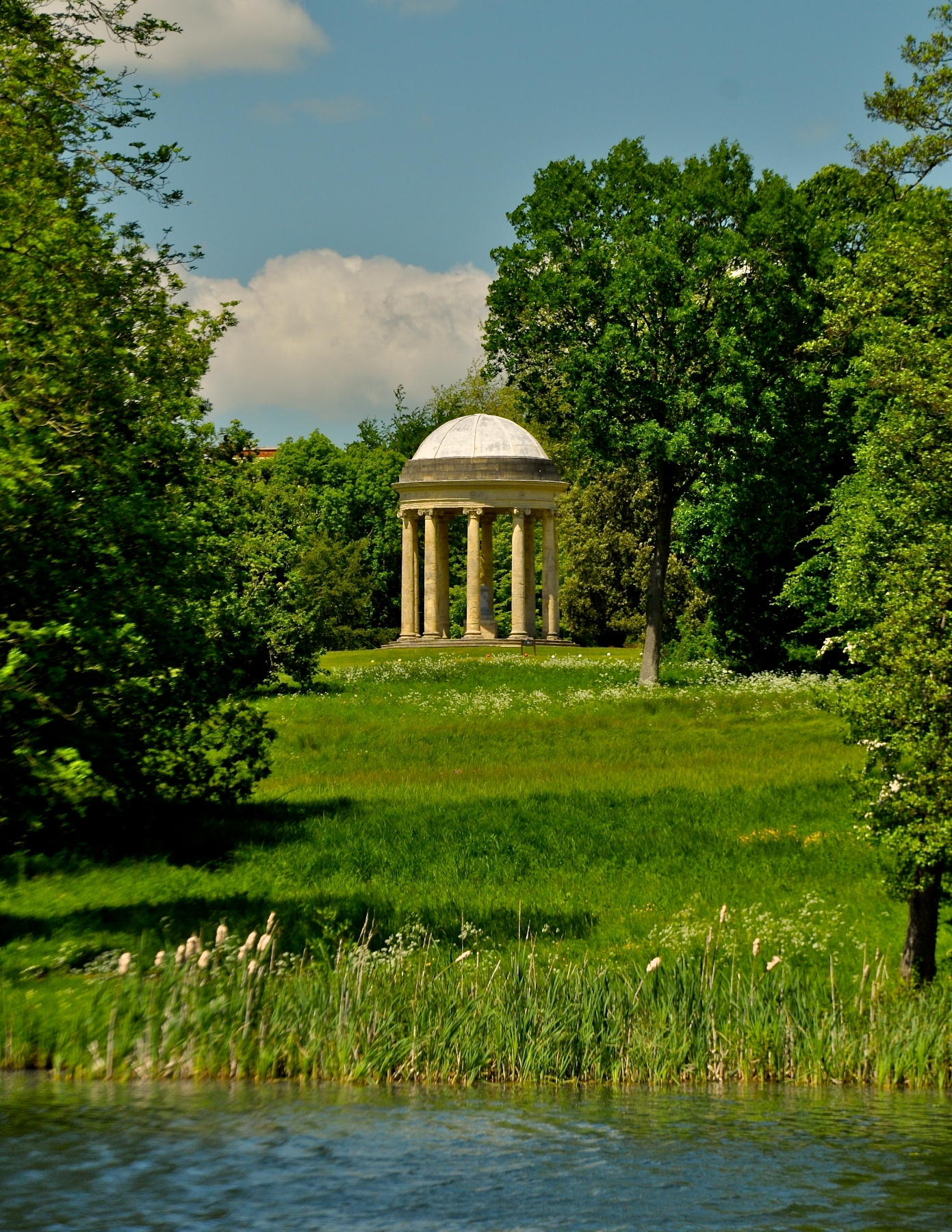
A monopteros at Stowe Gardens (1730–1738)

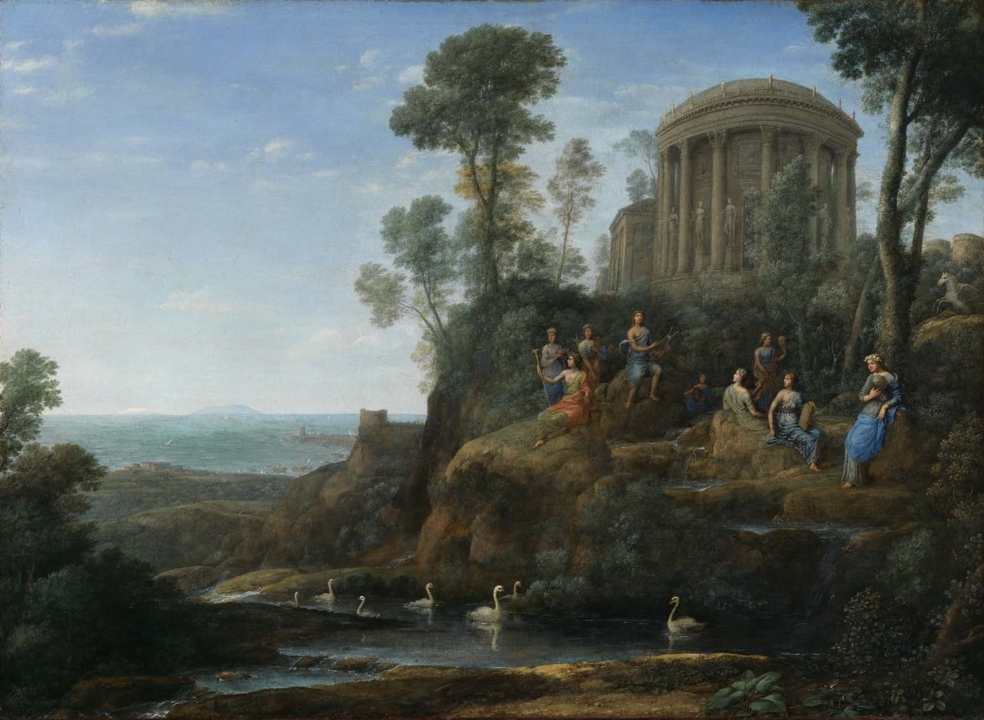
The paintings of Claude Lorrain inspired Stourhead and other English landscape gardens.

The English landscape garden, also called English landscape park or simply the English garden (French: Jardin à l'anglaise; Italian: Giardino all'inglese; German: Englischer Landschaftsgarten; Portuguese: Jardim inglês; Spanish: Jardín inglés), is a style of "landscape" garden which emerged in England in the early 18th century, and spread across Europe, replacing the more formal, symmetrical French formal garden which had emerged in the 17th century as the principal gardening style of Europe. The English garden presented an idealized view of nature. Created and pioneered by William Kent and others, the "informal" garden style originated as a revolt against the architectural garden and drew inspiration from landscape paintings by Salvator Rosa, Claude Lorrain, and Nicolas Poussin, as well as from the classic Chinese gardens of the East, which had recently been described by European travellers and were realized in the Anglo-Chinese garden.

The English garden usually included a lake, sweeps of gently rolling lawns set against groves of trees, and recreations of classical temples, Gothic ruins, bridges, and other picturesque architecture, designed to recreate an idyllic pastoral landscape. The work of Lancelot "Capability" Brown was particularly influential. By the end of the 18th century the English garden was being imitated by the French landscape garden, and as far away as St. Petersburg, Russia, in the Pavlovsk Palace, the gardens of the future Emperor Paul. It also had a major influence on the forms of public parks and gardens which appeared around the world in the 19th century. The English landscape garden was usually centred on the English country house, and many examples in the United Kingdom are popular visitor attractions today.

== History ==
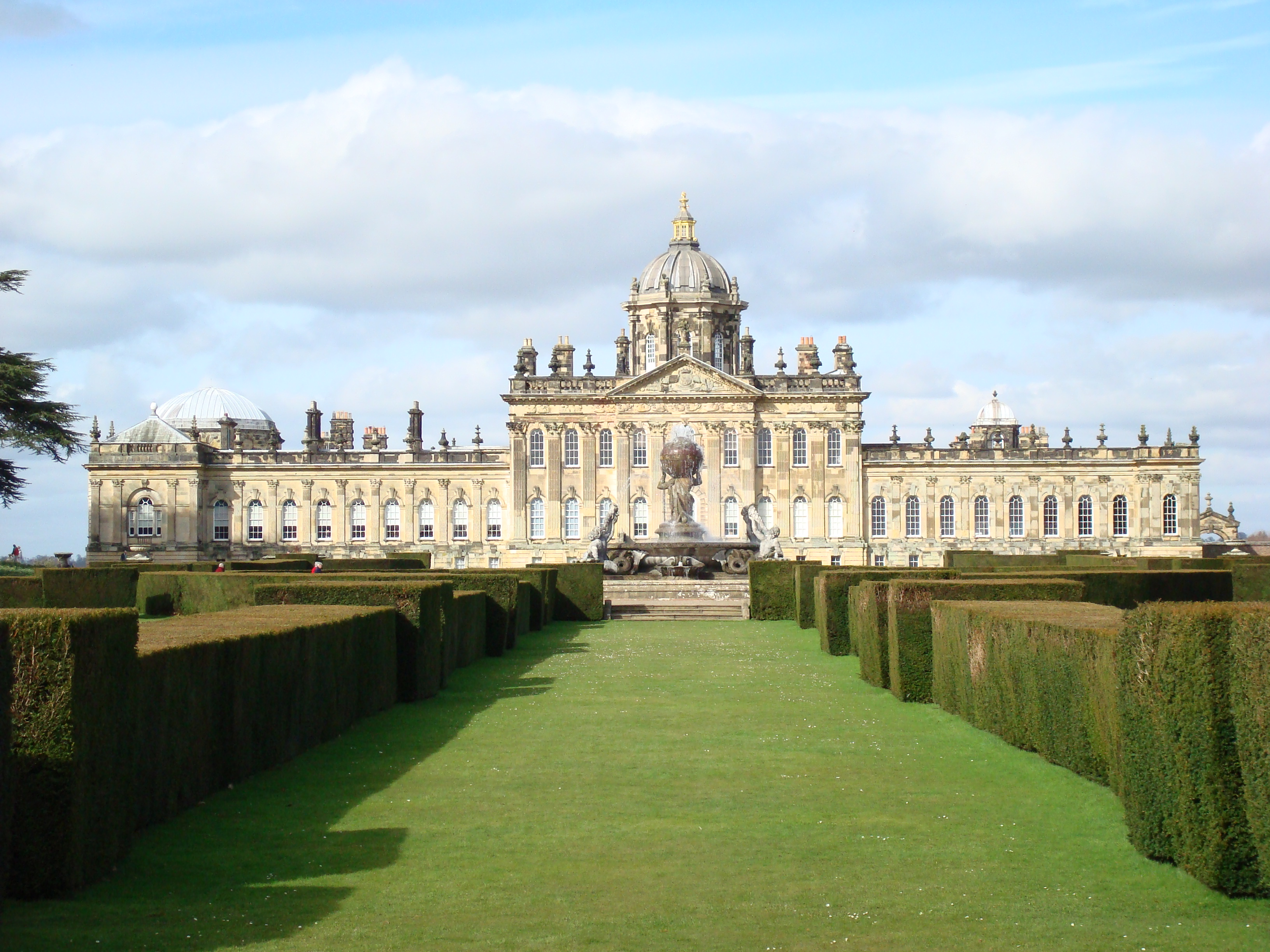
Castle Howard (1699–1712), a predecessor of the English garden modelled on the gardens of Versailles

The predecessors of the landscape garden in England were the great parks created by Sir John Vanbrugh (1664–1726) and Nicholas Hawksmoor at Castle Howard (1699–1712), Blenheim Palace (1705–1722), and the Claremont Landscape Garden at Claremont House (1715–1727). These parks featured vast lawns, woods, and pieces of architecture, such as the classical mausoleum designed by Hawksmoor at Castle Howard. At the centre of the composition was the house, behind which were formal and symmetrical gardens in the style of the garden à la française, with ornate carpets of floral designs and walls of hedges, decorated with statues and fountains. These gardens, modelled after the gardens of Versailles, were designed to impress visitors with their size and grandeur.

=== William Kent and Charles Bridgeman ===
The new style that became known as the English garden was invented by landscape designers William Kent and Charles Bridgeman, working for wealthy patrons, including Richard Temple, 1st Viscount Cobham; Richard Boyle, 3rd Earl of Burlington; and banker Henry Hoare. These men had large country estates, were members of the anti-royalist Whig Party, had classical educations, were patrons of the arts, and had taken the Grand Tour to Italy, where they had seen the Roman ruins and Italian landscapes they reproduced in their gardens.

William Kent (1685–1748) was an architect, painter and furniture designer who introduced Palladian-style architecture to England. Kent's inspiration came from Palladio's buildings in the Veneto and the landscapes and ruins around Rome – he lived in Italy from 1709 to 1719, and brought back many drawings of antique architecture and landscapes. His gardens were designed to complement the Palladian architecture of the houses he built.

Charles Bridgeman (1690–1738) was the son of a gardener and an experienced horticulturist, who became the Royal Gardener for Queen Anne and Prince George of Denmark, responsible for tending and redesigning the royal gardens at Windsor, Kensington Palace, Hampton Court, St. James's Park and Hyde Park. He collaborated with Kent on several major gardens, providing the botanical expertise which allowed Kent to realize his architectural visions.

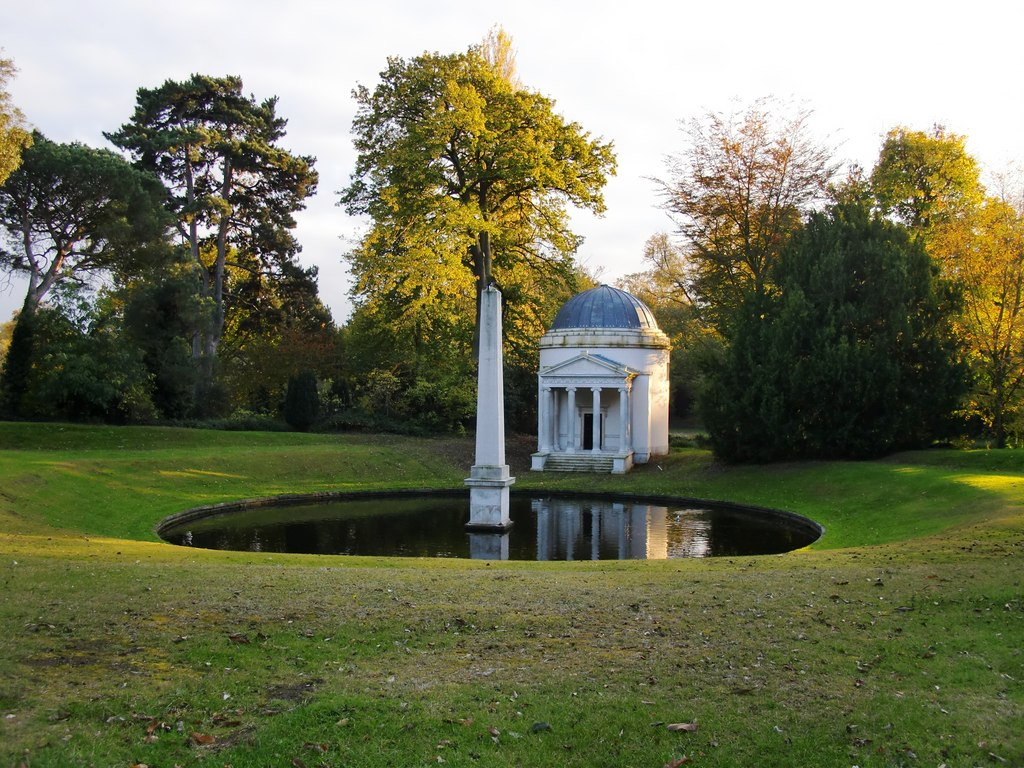
Ionic Temple at Chiswick House in west London

=== Chiswick House ===
Kent created one of the first true English landscape gardens at Chiswick House for Richard Boyle, 3rd Earl of Burlington. The first gardens that he laid out between 1724 and 1733 had many formal elements of a garden à la française, including alleys forming a patte d'oie and canals, but they also featured a folly, a picturesque recreation of an Ionic temple set in a theatre of trees. Between 1733 and 1736, he redesigned the garden, adding lawns sloping down to the edge of the river and a small cascade. For the first time the form of a garden was inspired not by architecture, but by an idealized version of nature.

=== Rousham ===
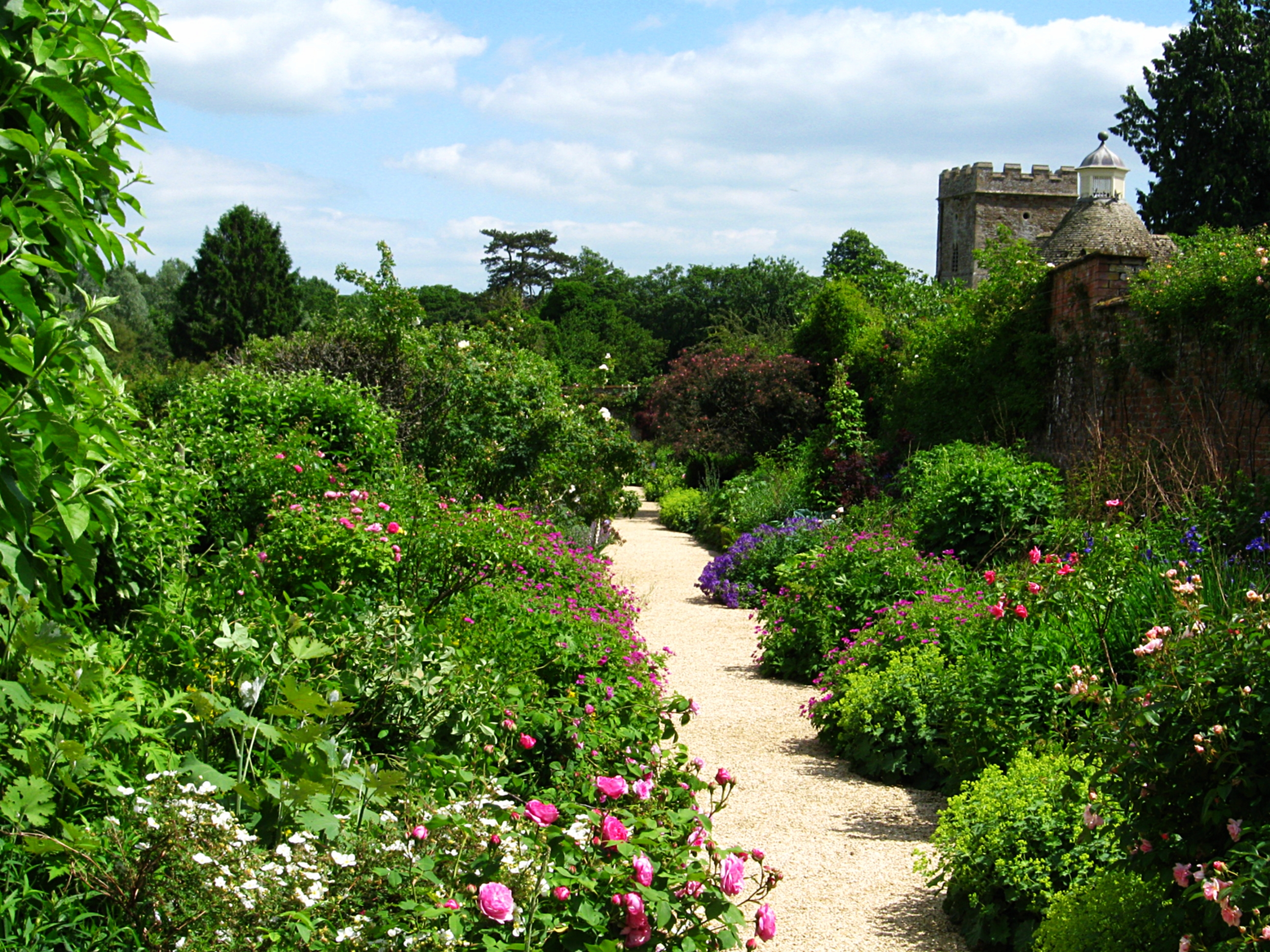
Garden of Rousham House in Oxfordshire

Rousham House in Oxfordshire is considered by some as the most accomplished and significant of William Kent's work. The patron was General James Dormer, who commissioned Bridgeman to begin the garden in 1727, then brought in Kent to recreate it in 1737. Bridgeman had built a series of garden features including a grotto of Venus on the slope along the River Cherwell, connected by straight alleys. Kent turned the alleys into winding paths, built a gently turning stream, used the natural landscape features and slopes, and created a series of views and tableaux decorated with allegorical statues of Apollo, a wounded gladiator, a lion attacking a horse, and other subjects. He placed eyecatchers, pieces of classical architecture, to decorate the landscape, and made use of the ha-ha, a concealed ditch that kept grazing animals out of the garden while giving an uninterrupted vista from within. Finally, he added cascades modelled on those of the garden of Villa Aldobrandini and Villa di Pratolino in Italy, to add movement and drama.

=== Stowe House ===
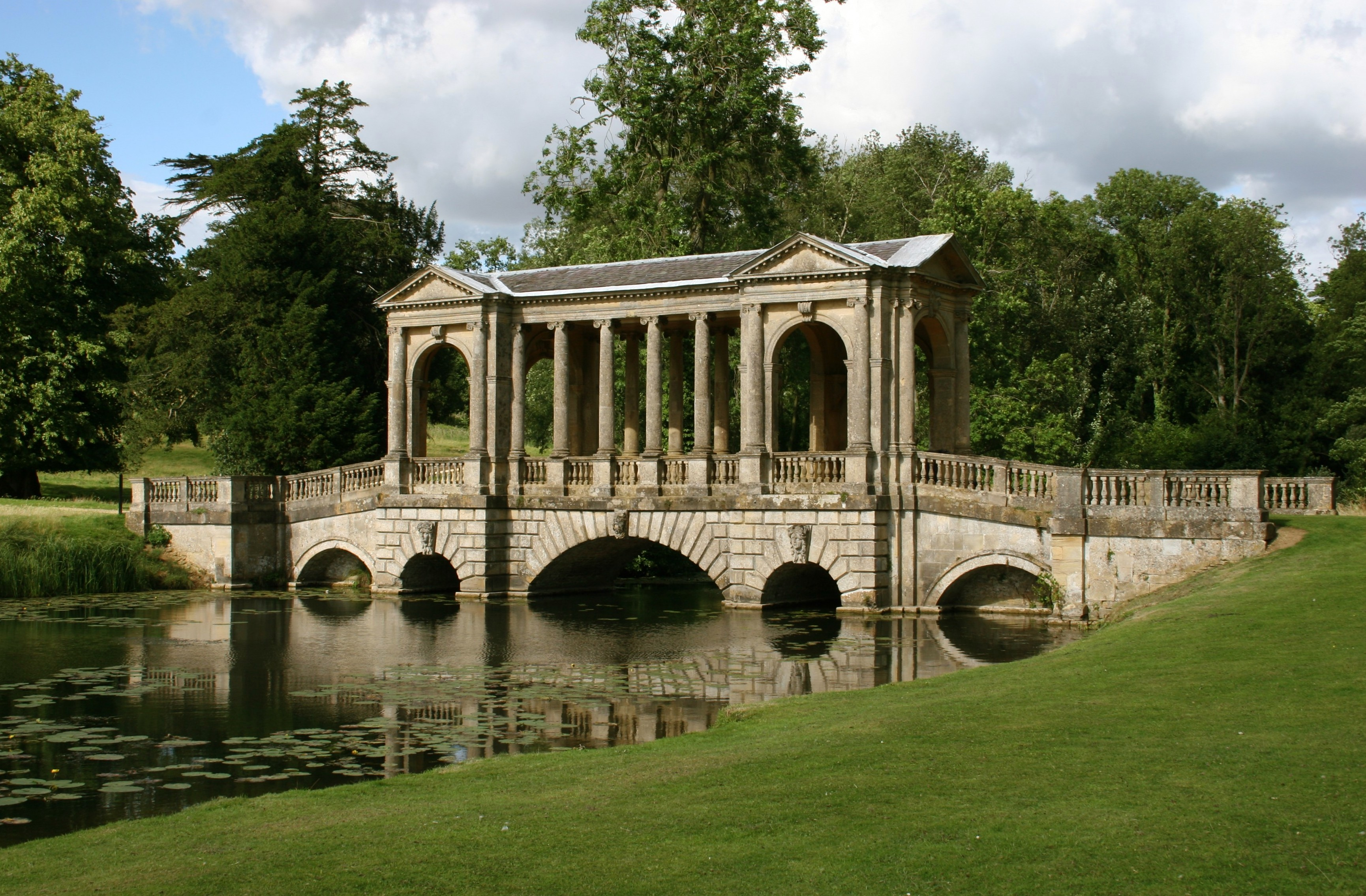
Palladian bridge at Stowe (1730–1738)

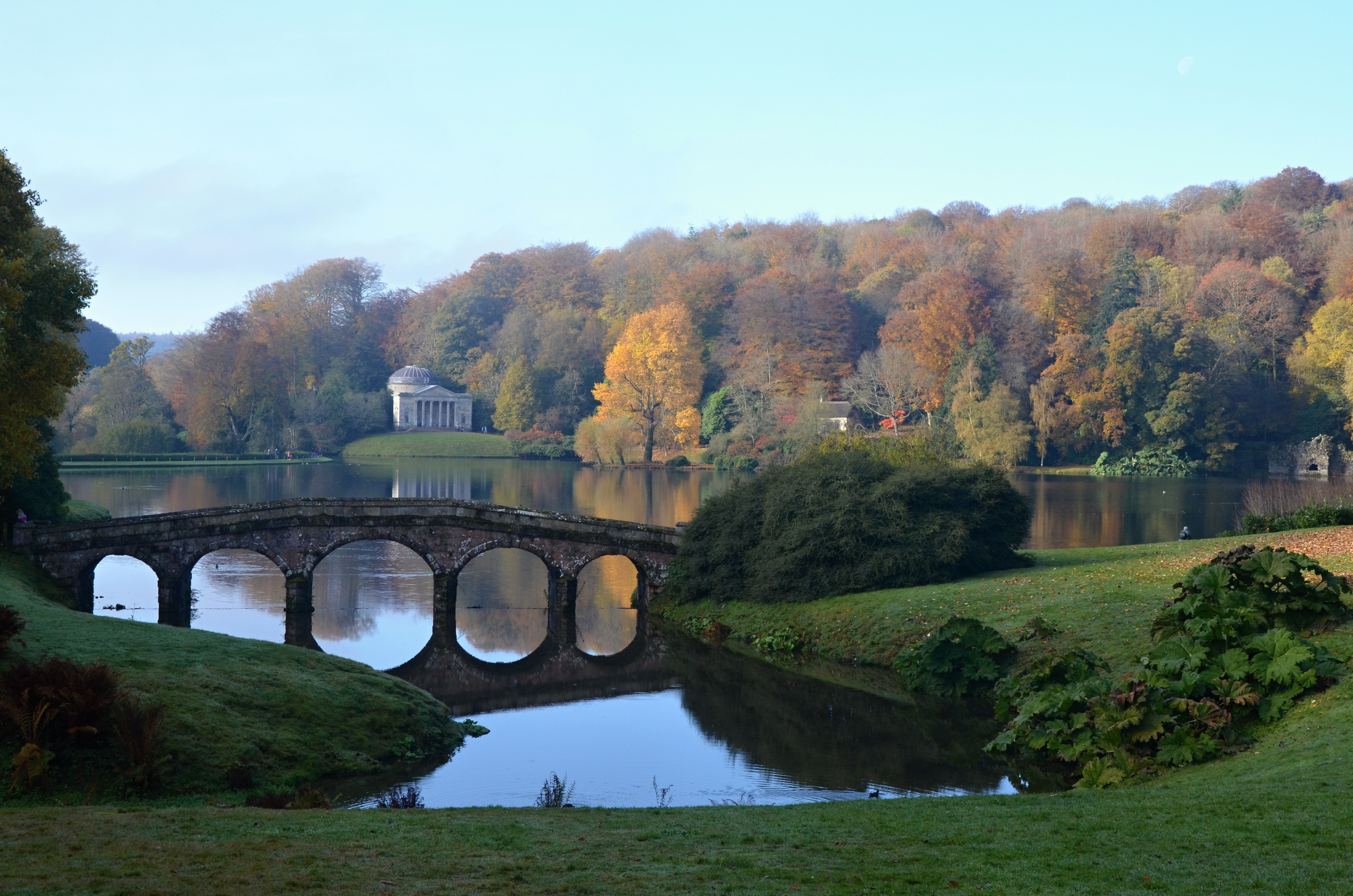
Palladian bridge and Pantheon at Stourhead

Stowe Gardens, in Buckinghamshire, (1730–1738), was an even more radical departure from the formal French garden. In the early 18th century, Richard Temple, 1st Viscount Cobham, had commissioned Charles Bridgeman to design a formal garden, with architectural decorations by John Vanbrugh. Bridgeman's design included an octagonal lake and a rotunda (1720–21) designed by Vanbrugh.

In the 1730s, William Kent and James Gibbs were appointed to work with Bridgeman, who died in 1738. Kent remade the lake in a more natural shape, and created a new kind of garden, which took visitors on a tour of picturesque landscapes. It eventually included a Palladian bridge (1738); a Temple of Venus (1731) in the form of a Palladian villa; a Temple of Ancient Virtues (1737), with statues of famous Greeks and Romans; a Temple of British Worthies (1734–1735), with statues of British heroes; and a Temple of Modern Virtues, which was deliberately left in ruins, which contained a headless statue of Robert Walpole, Cobham's political rival.

The garden attracted visitors from all over Europe, including Jean-Jacques Rousseau. It became the inspiration for landscape gardens in Britain and on the Continent.

=== Stourhead ===
Stourhead, in Wiltshire (1741–1780), created by banker Henry Hoare, was one of the first 'picturesque' gardens, inspired to resemble the paintings of Claude Lorrain. Hoare had travelled to Italy on the Grand Tour and had returned with a painting by Claude Lorrain. Hoare dammed a stream on his estate, created a lake, and surrounded the lake with landscapes and architectural constructions representing the different steps of the journey of Aeneas in the Aeneid by Virgil.

== The great age of the English garden ==
=== Capability Brown ===
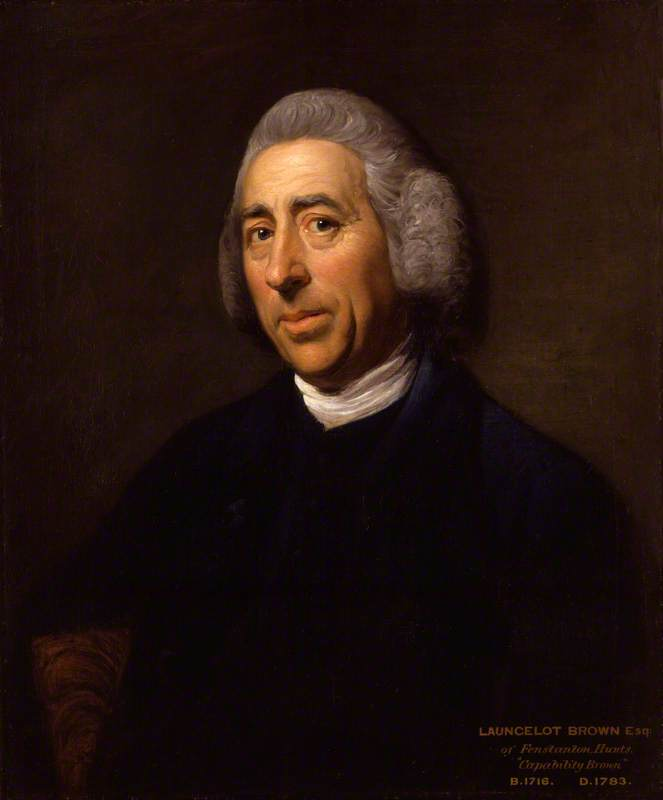
Portrait of Capability Brown by Nathaniel Dance-Holland, 1769

The most influential figure in the later development of the English landscape garden was Lancelot "Capability" Brown (1716–1783), who began his career in 1740 as a gardener at Stowe Gardens under Charles Bridgeman, then succeeded William Kent in 1748.

Brown's contribution was to simplify the garden by eliminating geometric structures, alleys, and parterres near the house and replacing them with rolling lawns and extensive views out to isolated groups of trees, making the landscape seem even larger. "He sought to create an ideal landscape out of the English countryside." He created artificial lakes and used dams and canals to transform streams or springs into the illusion that a river flowed through the garden.

He compared his own role as a garden designer to that of a poet or composer. "Here I put a comma, there, when it's necessary to cut the view, I put a parenthesis; there I end it with a period and start on another theme."

Brown designed 170 gardens. The most important were:

- Petworth (West Sussex) in 1752;
- Chatsworth (Derbyshire) in 1761;
- Bowood (Wiltshire) in 1763;
- Blenheim Palace (Oxfordshire) in 1764.

=== Humphry Repton ===
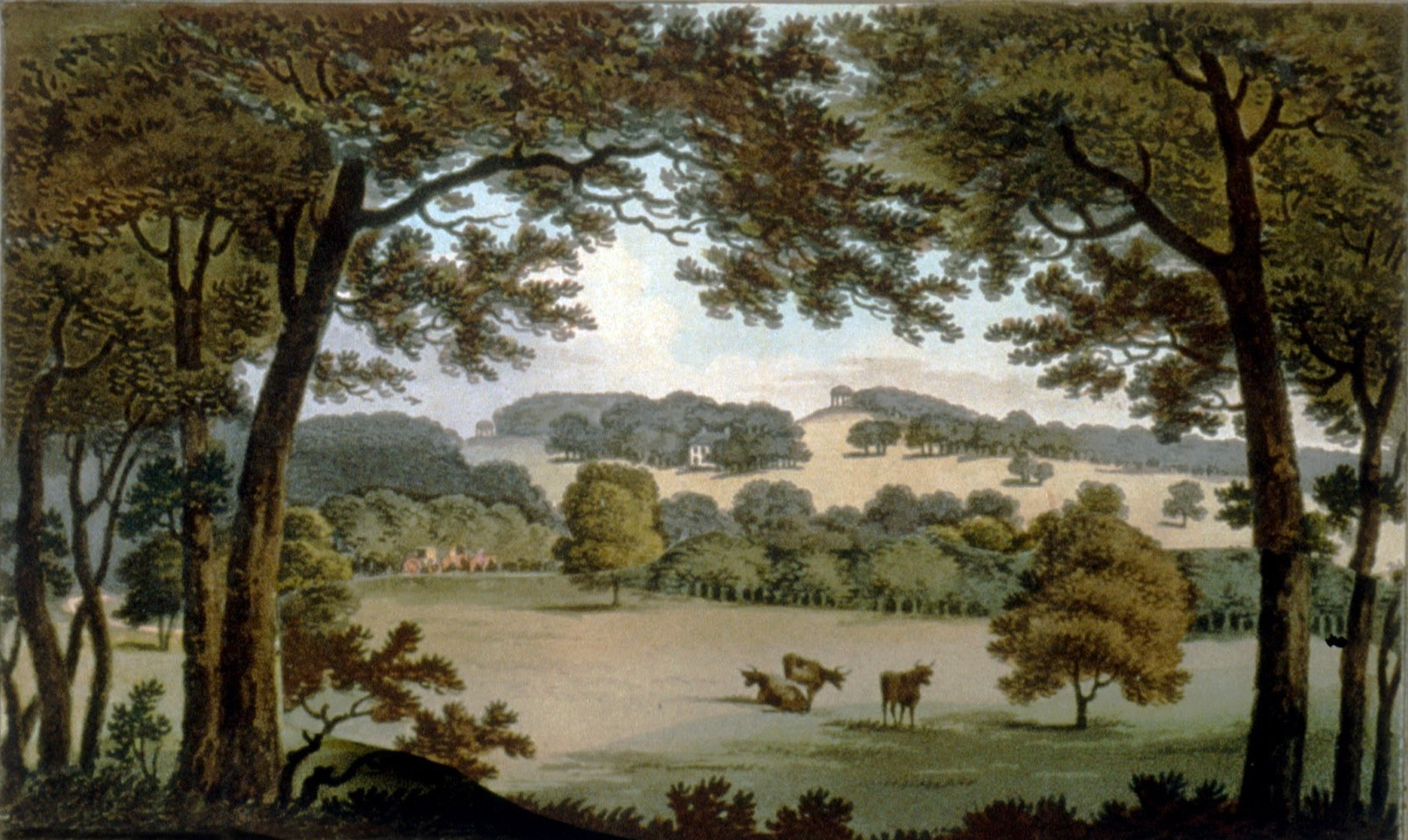
View of Wentworth Woodhouse, South Yorkshire by Humphry Repton, before proposed landscaping

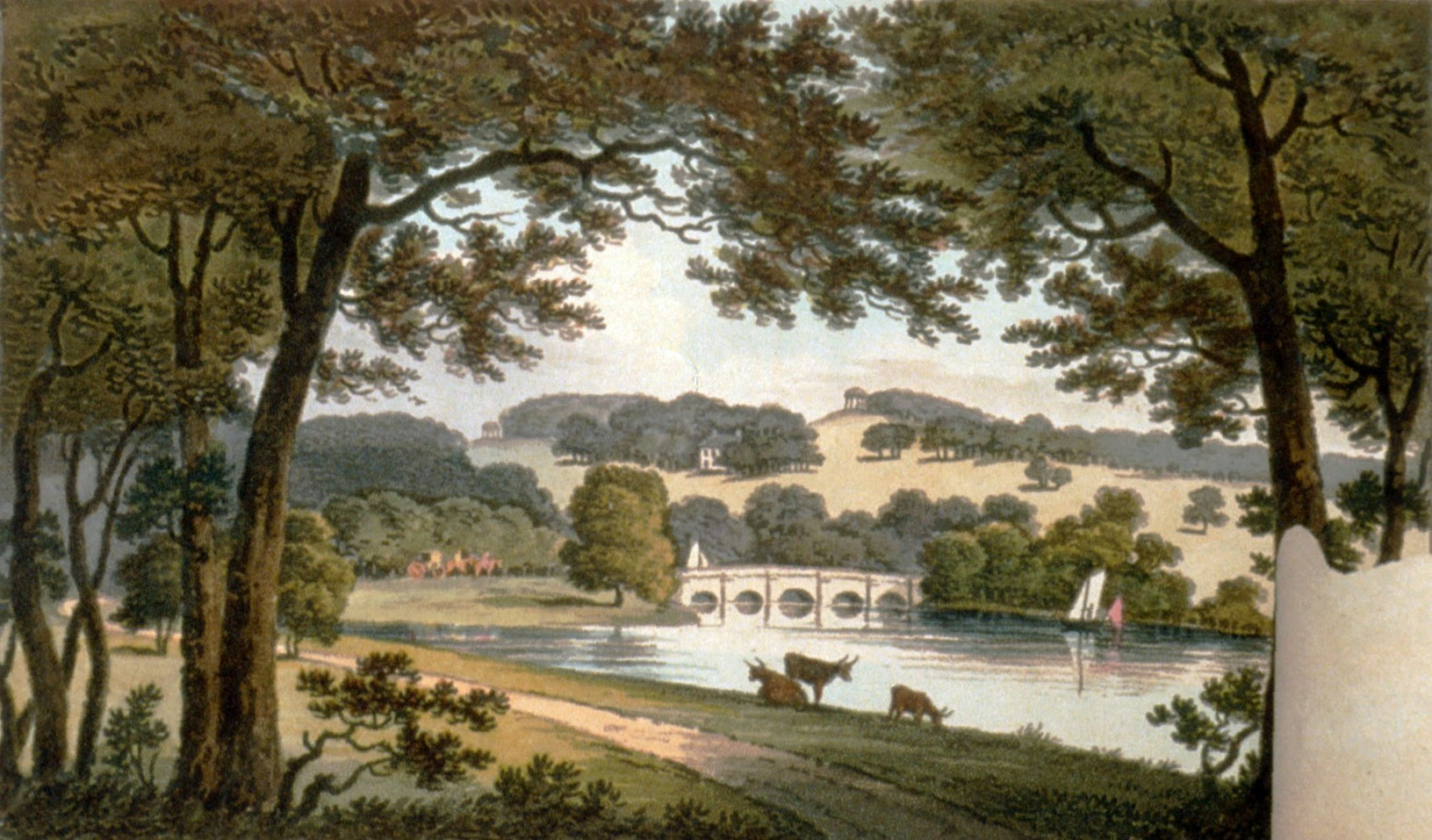
View of Wentworth Woodhouse, South Yorkshire after proposed landscaping, with 'flap' opened to show new lake and bridge

Humphry Repton (21 April 1752 – 24 March 1818) was the last great English landscape designer of the eighteenth century, often regarded as the successor to Capability Brown. Repton hit upon the idea of becoming a "landscape gardener" (a term he himself coined) after failing at various ventures and, sensing an opportunity after Brown's death, was ambitious to fill the gap and sent circulars round his contacts in the upper classes advertising his services. To help clients visualize his designs, Repton produced 'Red Books' (so called for their binding) with explanatory text and watercolors with a system of overlays to show 'before' and 'after' views.

In 1794 Richard Payne Knight and Uvedale Price simultaneously published vicious attacks on the 'meagre genius of the bare and bald', criticizing Brown's smooth, serpentine curves as bland and unnatural and championing rugged and intricate designs, composed according to 'picturesque theory' that designed landscapes should be composed like landscape paintings, with a foreground, a middle ground and a background. Early in his career, Repton defended Brown's reputation during the 'picturesque controversy'. However, as his career progressed Repton came to apply picturesque theory to the practice of landscape design. He believed that the foreground should be the realm of art (with formal geometry and ornamental planting), that the middle ground should have a parkland character of the type created by Brown and that the background should have a wild and 'natural' character. Repton re-introduced formal terraces, balustrades, trellis work and flower gardens around the house in a way that became common practice in the nineteenth century.

Repton published four major books on garden design: Sketches and Hints on Landscape Gardening (1795), Observations on the Theory and Practice of Landscape Gardening (1803), An Inquiry into the Changes of Taste in Landscape Gardening (1806) and Fragments on the Theory and Practice of Landscape Gardening (1816). These drew on material and techniques used in the Red Books. These works greatly influenced other landscape-designers including John Claudius Loudon, John Nash, Jean-Charles Adolphe Alphand, Hermann Ludwig Heinrich Pückler-Muskau and Frederick Law Olmsted.

== The "forest or savage garden" ==
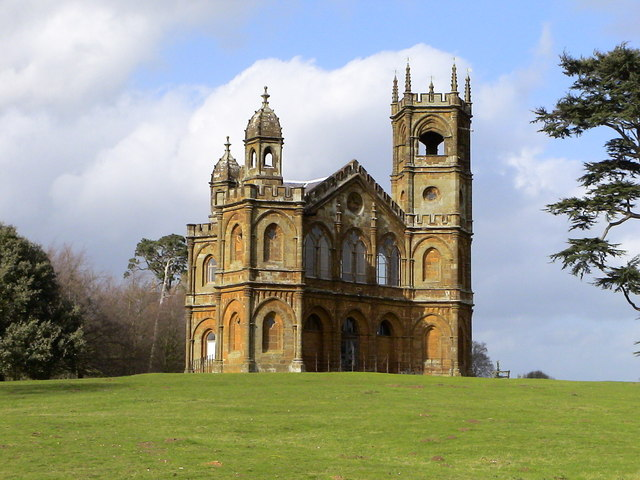
The Gothic temple on Hawkwelle Hill at Stowe House in Buckinghamshire

One aspect of the new style was making woodland more interesting and ornamental, leading to the establishment of the woodland garden as a distinct type. This took several forms, one of which was helped by the developing Gothic Revival. Horace Walpole, a great promoter of the English landscape garden style, praised Painshill in Surrey, whose varied features included a shrubbery with American plants, and a sloping "Alpine Valley" of conifers, as one of the best of the new style of "forest or savage gardens". This was a style of woodland aiming at the sublime, a newly-fashionable concept in literature and the arts, or at the least to be picturesque, another new term. It really required steep slopes, even if not very high, along which paths could be made revealing dramatic views, by which contemporary viewers who had read Gothic novels like Walpole's The Castle of Otranto (1764) were very ready to be impressed.

The appropriate style of garden buildings was Gothic rather than Neoclassical, and exotic planting was more likely to be evergreen conifers rather than flowering plants, replacing "the charm of bright, pleasant scenery in favour of the dark and rugged, gloomy and dramatic". A leading example of the style was Studley Royal in North Yorkshire, which had the great advantage, at what was known as "The Surprise View", of suddenly revealing a distant view from above of the impressive ruins of Fountains Abbey.

At Stowe, Capability Brown followed the new fashion between 1740 and 1753 by adding a new section to the park, called Hawkwelle Hill or the Gothic promenade, with a Gothic revival building. Walpole had decided in 1751 "to go Gothic", as he put it in a letter, and thereafter was a leading propagandist for the style, with his own house, Strawberry Hill in Twickenham, still the most extreme example of 18th-century "Gothick" style.

== The "Anglo-Chinese" garden ==
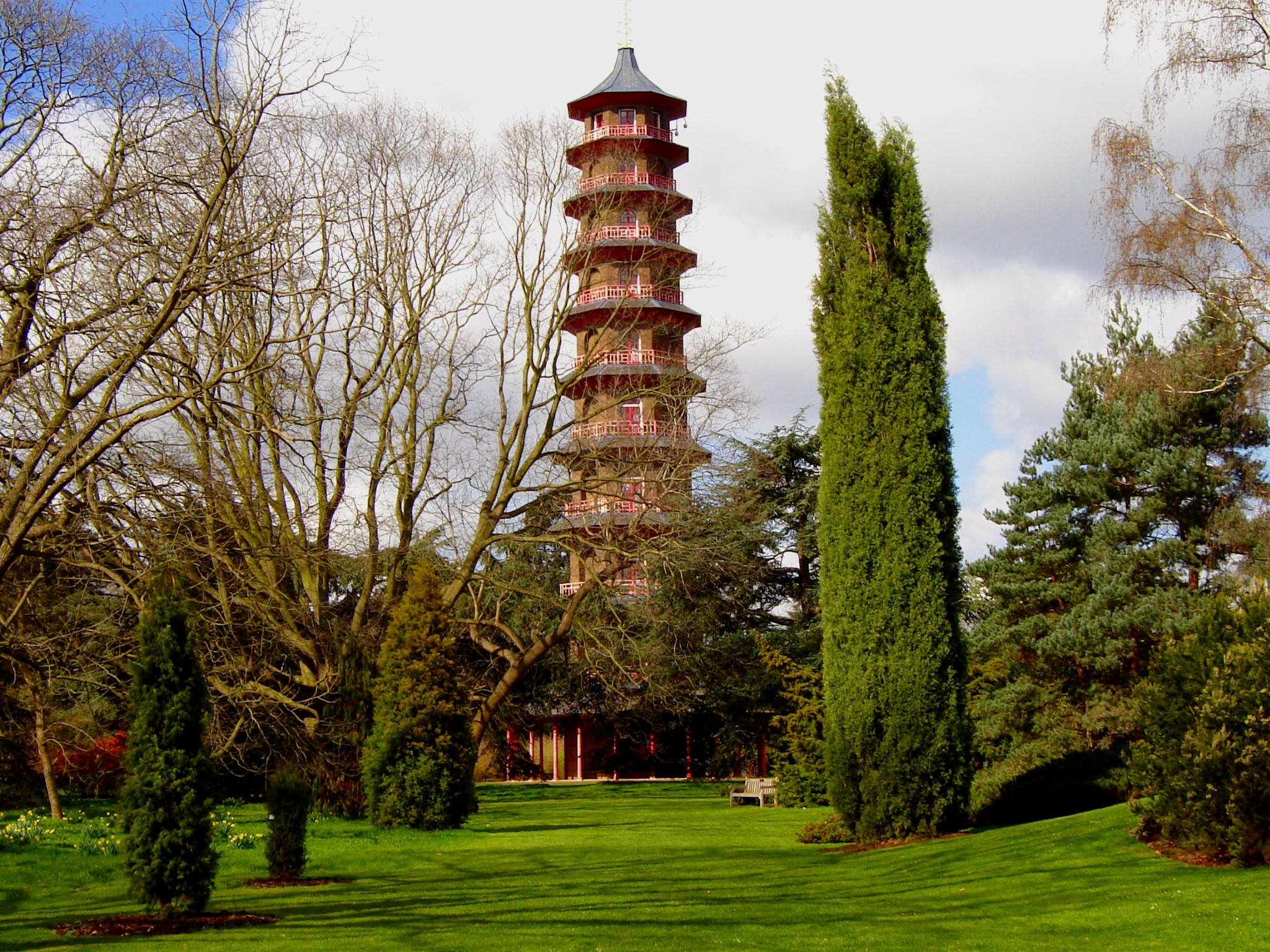
The Great Pagoda, Kew Gardens, West London (1761)

According to some writers, especially French ones, the Far East inspired the origins of the English landscape garden, via Holland. In 1685, the English writer, formerly a diplomat at The Hague, Sir William Temple wrote an essay Upon the garden of Epicurus (published in 1690), including a passage which contrasted European symmetrical and formal gardens with asymmetrical compositions from China, for which he introduced (as Chinese) the term sharawadgi, in fact probably a mangled Japanese word for "irregularity". Temple had never visited the Far East, but he was in contact with the Dutch and their discourse on irregularity in design, had spoken to a merchant who had been in the Far East for a long time, and read the works of European travellers there. He noted that Chinese gardens avoided formal rows of trees and flower beds, and instead placed trees, plants, and other garden features in irregular ways to strike the eye and create beautiful compositions, with an understatement criticizing the formal compositions of the gardens at the Palace of Versailles of Louis XIV of France. His observations on the Chinese garden were cited by the essayist Joseph Addison in an essay in 1712, who used them to attack the English gardeners who, instead of imitating nature, tried to make their gardens in the French style, as far from nature as possible.

The novelty and exoticism of Chinese art and architecture in Europe led in 1738 to the construction of the first Chinese-style building in an English garden, in the garden of Stowe House, at a time when chinoiserie was popular in most forms of the decorative arts across Europe. The style became even more popular thanks to William Chambers (1723–1796), who lived in China from 1745 to 1747, and wrote a book, Designs of Chinese Buildings, Furniture, Dresses, Machines, and Utensils. To which is annexed, a Description of their Temples, Houses, Gardens, &c. published in 1757. In 1761 he built the Great Pagoda, London, as part of Kew Gardens, a park with gardens and architecture symbolizing all parts of the world and all architectural styles. Thereafter Chinese pagodas began to appear in other English gardens, then in France and elsewhere on the continent. French observers coined the term Jardin Anglo-Chinois (Anglo-Chinese garden) for this style of garden.

== The English garden spreads to Continental Europe ==
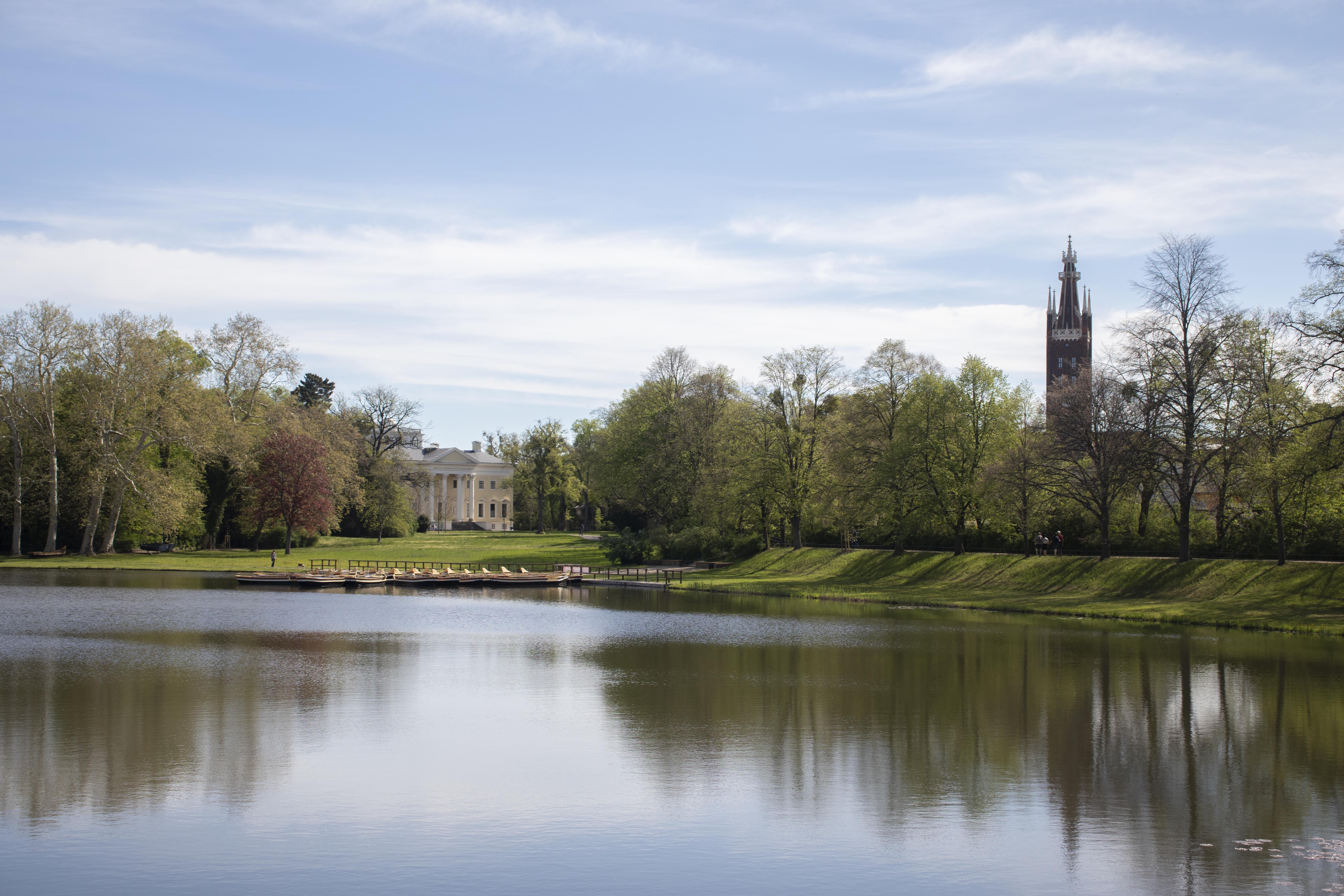
The English Grounds of Wörlitz in Germany were one of the largest English parks in 18th-century Europe.

Descriptions of English gardens were first brought to France by Jean-Bernard, abbé Le Blanc, who published accounts of his voyage in 1745 and 1751. A treatise, and tour guide, on the English garden, Observations on Modern Gardening, written by Thomas Whately and published in London in 1770, was translated into French and German in 1771. After the end of the Seven Years' War in 1763, French noblemen were able to voyage to England and see the gardens for themselves, and the style began to be adapted in French gardens. The new style also had the advantage of requiring fewer gardeners, and was easier to maintain, than the French garden.

One of the first English gardens on the continent was at Ermenonville, in France, built by marquis René Louis de Girardin from 1763 to 1776 and based on the ideals of Jean Jacques Rousseau, who was buried within the park. Rousseau and the garden's founder had visited Stowe a few years earlier. Other early examples were the Désert de Retz, Yvelines (1774–1782); the Gardens of the Château de Bagatelle in the Bois de Boulogne, west of Paris (1777–1784); The Folie Saint James, in Neuilly-sur-Seine, (1777–1780); and the Château de Méréville, in the Essonne department, (1784–1786). Even at Versailles, the home of the most classical of all French gardens, a small English landscape park with a Roman temple was built and a mock village, the Hameau de la Reine (1783–1789), was created for Marie Antoinette.

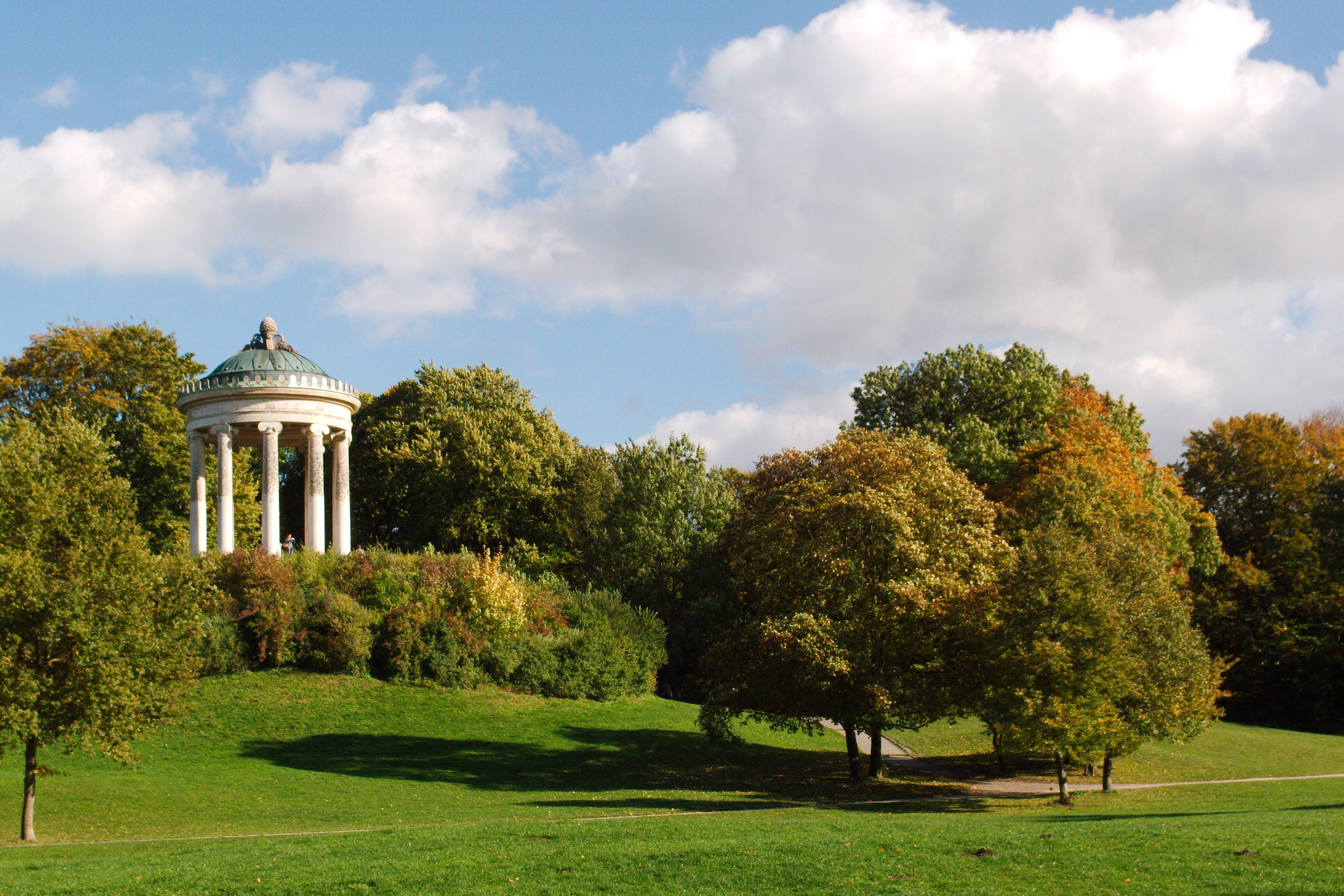
The monopteros or rotunda (left) in the Munich Englischer Garten

The new style also spread to Germany. The central English Grounds of Wörlitz, in the Principality of Anhalt, was laid out between 1769 and 1773 by Leopold III, Duke of Anhalt-Dessau, based on the models of Claremont, Stourhead and Stowe Landscape Gardens. Another notable example was The Englischer Garten in Munich, Germany, created in 1789 by Sir Benjamin Thompson (1753–1814).

In the Netherlands the landscape-architect Lucas Pieters Roodbaard (1782–1851) designed several gardens and parks in this style. The style was introduced to Sweden by Fredrik Magnus Piper.

In Poland the main example of this style is Łazienki Park in Warsaw. The garden scheme owes its shape and appearance mainly to the last king of the country Stanisław August Poniatowski. In another part of the Polish–Lithuanian Commonwealth the Sofiyivka Park (Zofiówka), now Ukraine, was designed by Count Stanisław Szczęsny Potocki so as to illustrate the Odyssey and the Iliad.

The style also spread rapidly to Russia, where in 1774 Catherine the Great adapted the new style in the park of her palace at Tsarskoe Selo, complete with a mock Chinese village and a Palladian bridge, modeled after that at Wilton House. A much larger park was created for her son Paul in the neighbouring estate of Pavlovsk. The Monrepos Park is sited on the rocky island of Linnasaari in the Vyborg Bay and is noted for its glacially deposited boulders and granite rocks.

== Characteristics of the English garden abroad ==
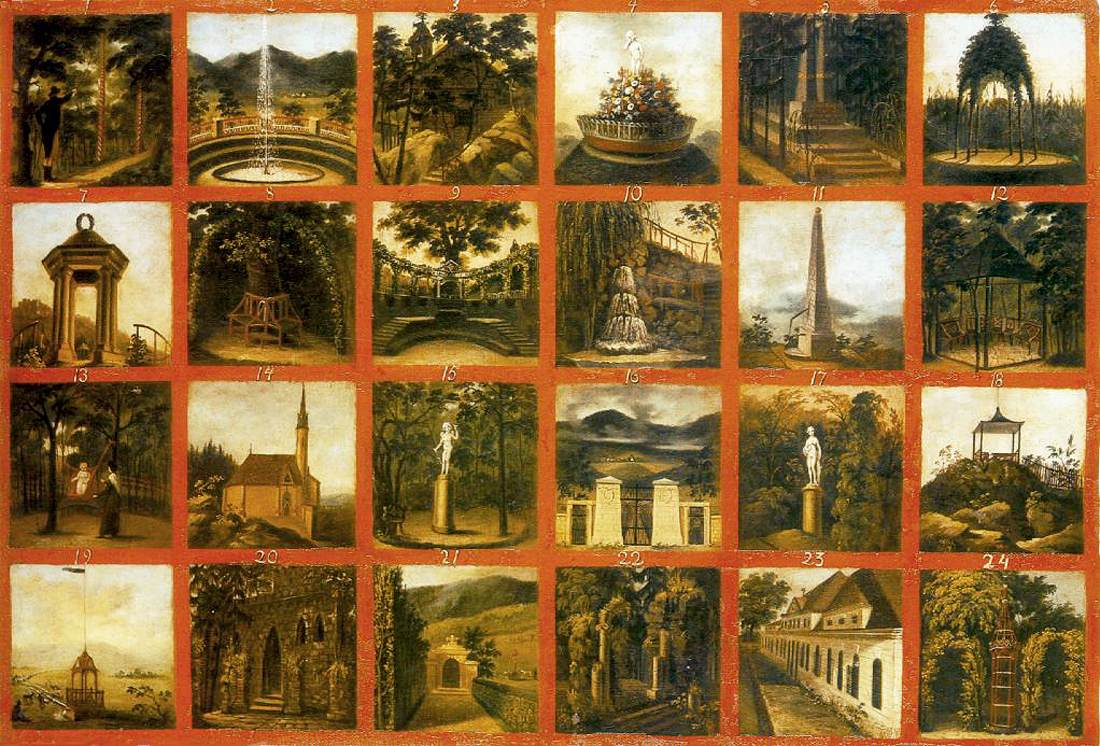
1803 painting of an English garden's elements by the Hungarian painter Johann Rombauer

The continental European "English garden" is characteristically on a smaller scale; many are in or on the edge of cities, rather than in the middle of the countryside. Such gardens usually lack the sweeping vistas of gently rolling ground and water, which in England tend to be set against a woodland background with clumps of trees and outlier groves. Instead, they are often more densely studded with "eye-catchers", such as grottoes, temples, tea-houses, belvederes, pavilions, sham ruins, bridges, and statues. The name English garden – not used in the United Kingdom, where "landscape garden" serves – differentiates it from the formal Baroque design of the garden à la française. One of the best-known English gardens in Europe is the Englischer Garten in Munich.

The dominant style was revised in the early 19th century to include more "gardenesque" features, including shrubberies with gravelled walks, tree plantations to satisfy botanical curiosity, and, most notably, the return of flowers, in skirts of sweeping planted beds. This is the version of the landscape garden most imitated in Europe in the 19th century. The outer areas of the "home park" of English country houses retain their naturalistic shaping. English gardening since the 1840s has been on a more restricted scale, closer and more allied to the residence.

The canonical European English park contains a number of Romantic elements. Always present is a pond or small lake with a pier or bridge. Overlooking the pond is a round or hexagonal pavilion, often in the shape of a monopteros, a Roman temple. Sometimes the park also has a "Chinese" pavilion. Other elements include a grotto and imitation ruins.

A second style of English garden, which became popular during the 20th century in France and northern Europe, is based on the style of the late 19th-century English cottage garden, with abundant mixed planting of flowers, intended to appear largely unplanned.

== Gallery ==
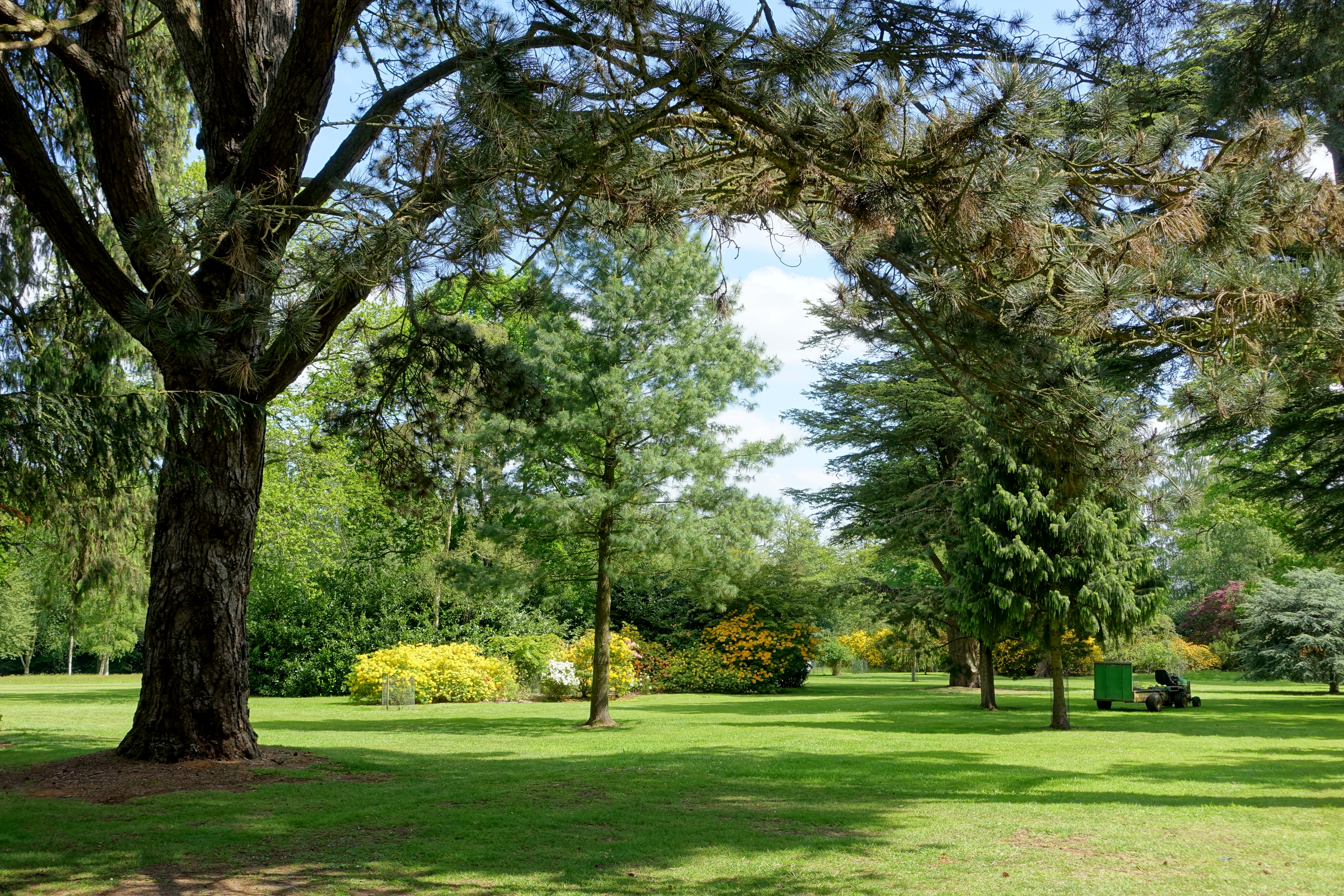
Pinetum at Bowood House in Wiltshire

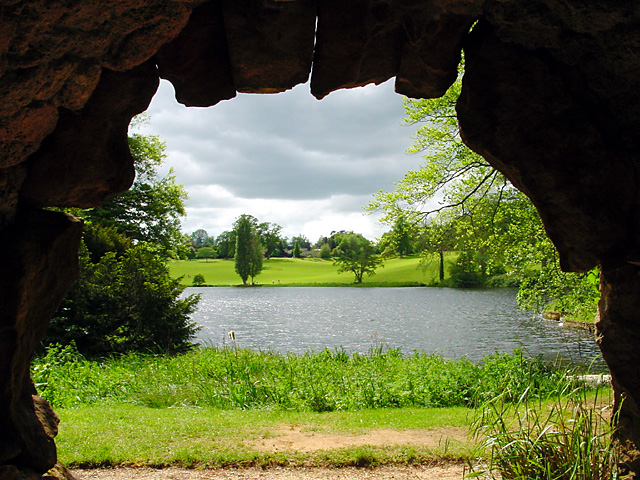
View from Capability Brown's grotto at Bowood House

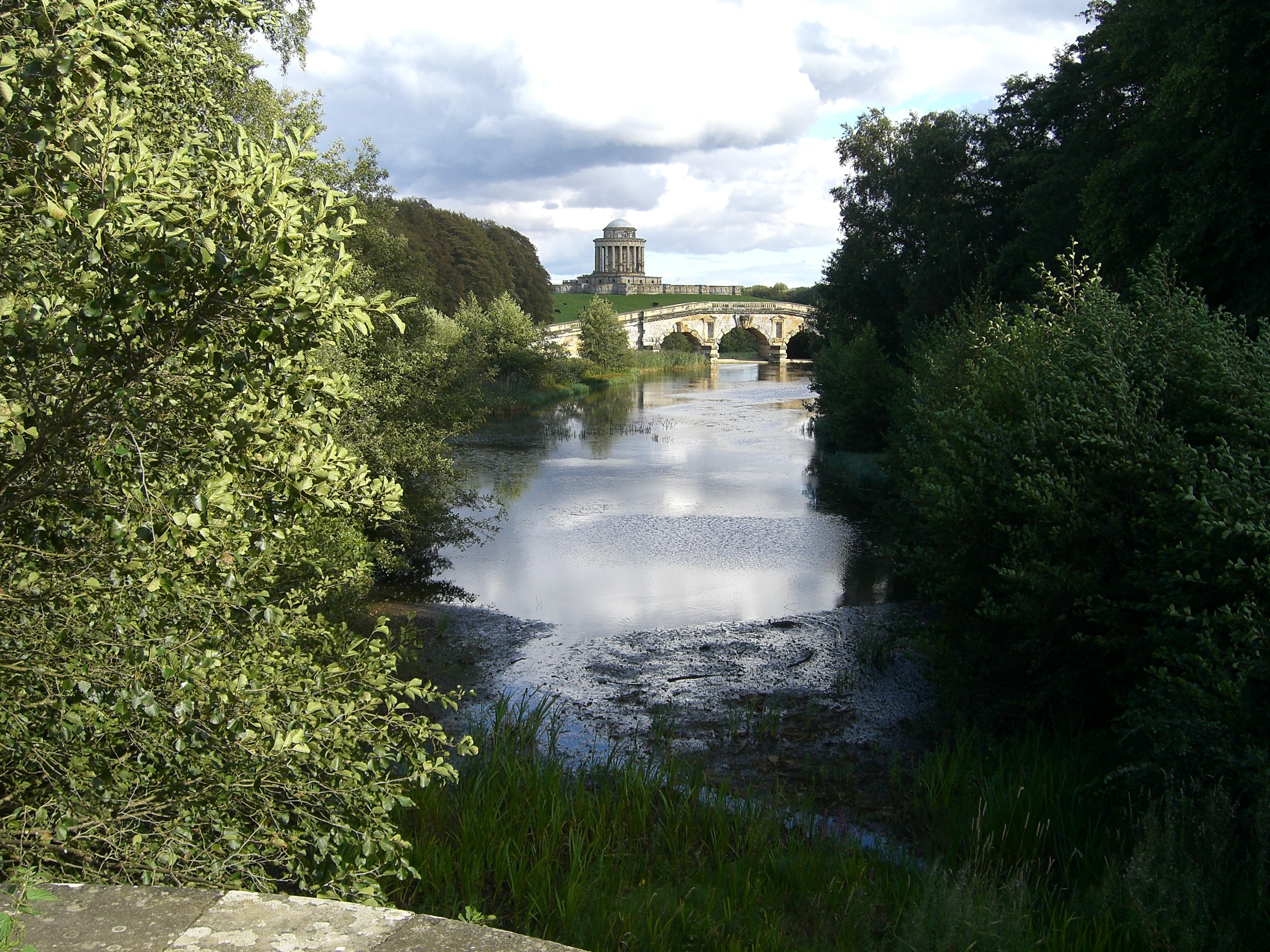
Bridge and mausoleum at Castle Howard in North Yorkshire

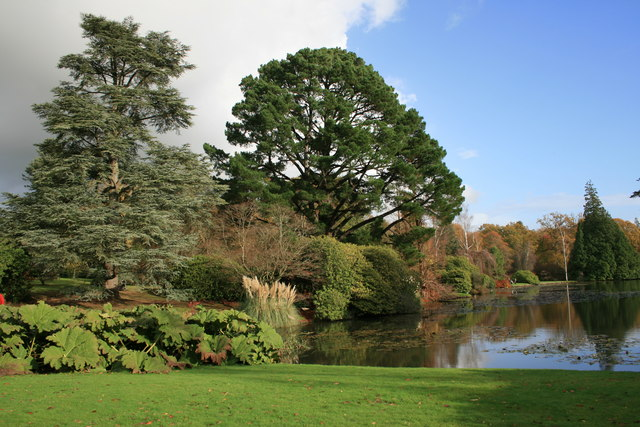
Sheffield Park Garden in East Sussex

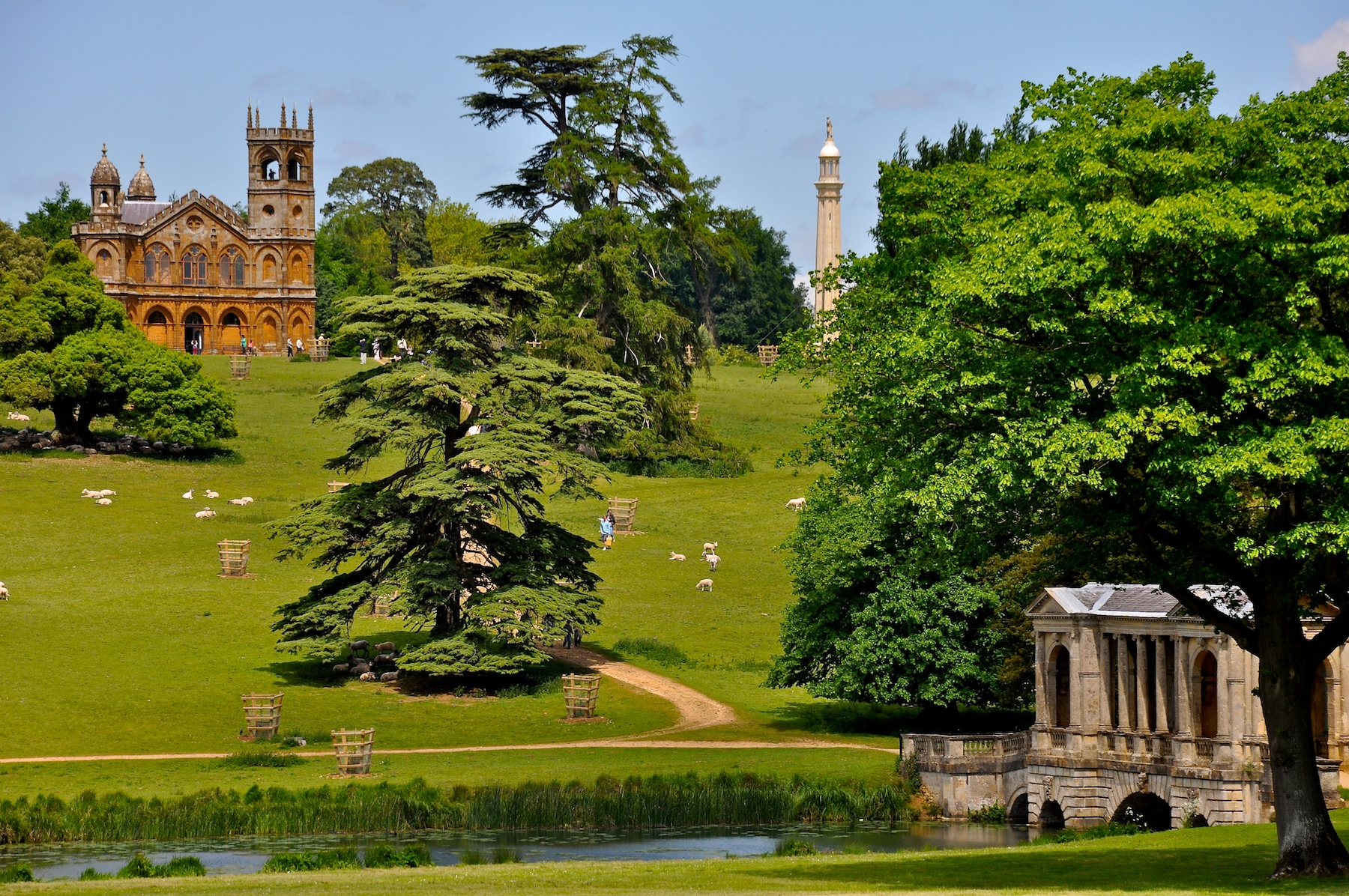
Hawkwell Hill with Gothic temple, Cobham monument and Palladian bridge at Stowe House in Buckinghamshire

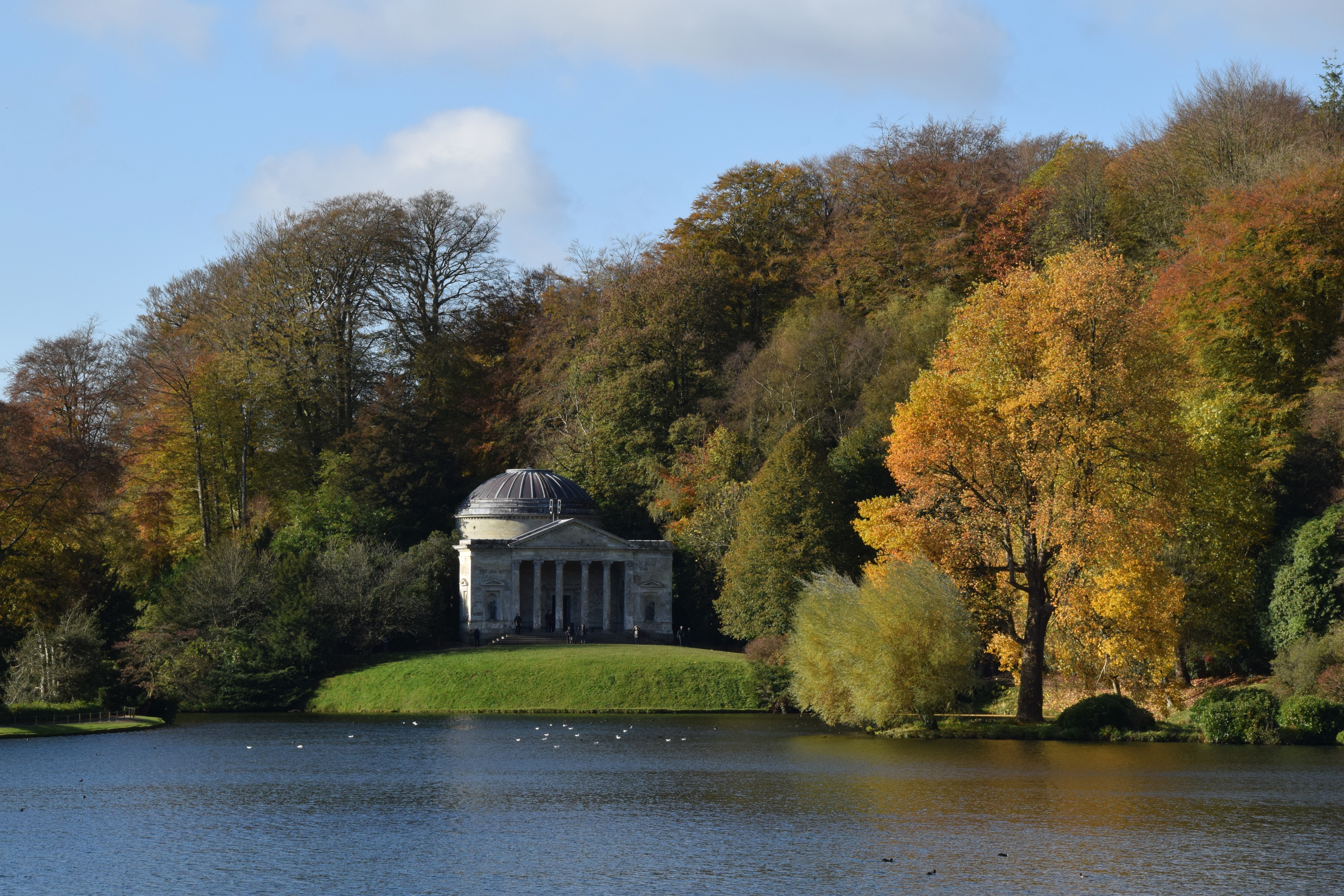
Eyecatching pantheon at the Stourhead estate in Wiltshire

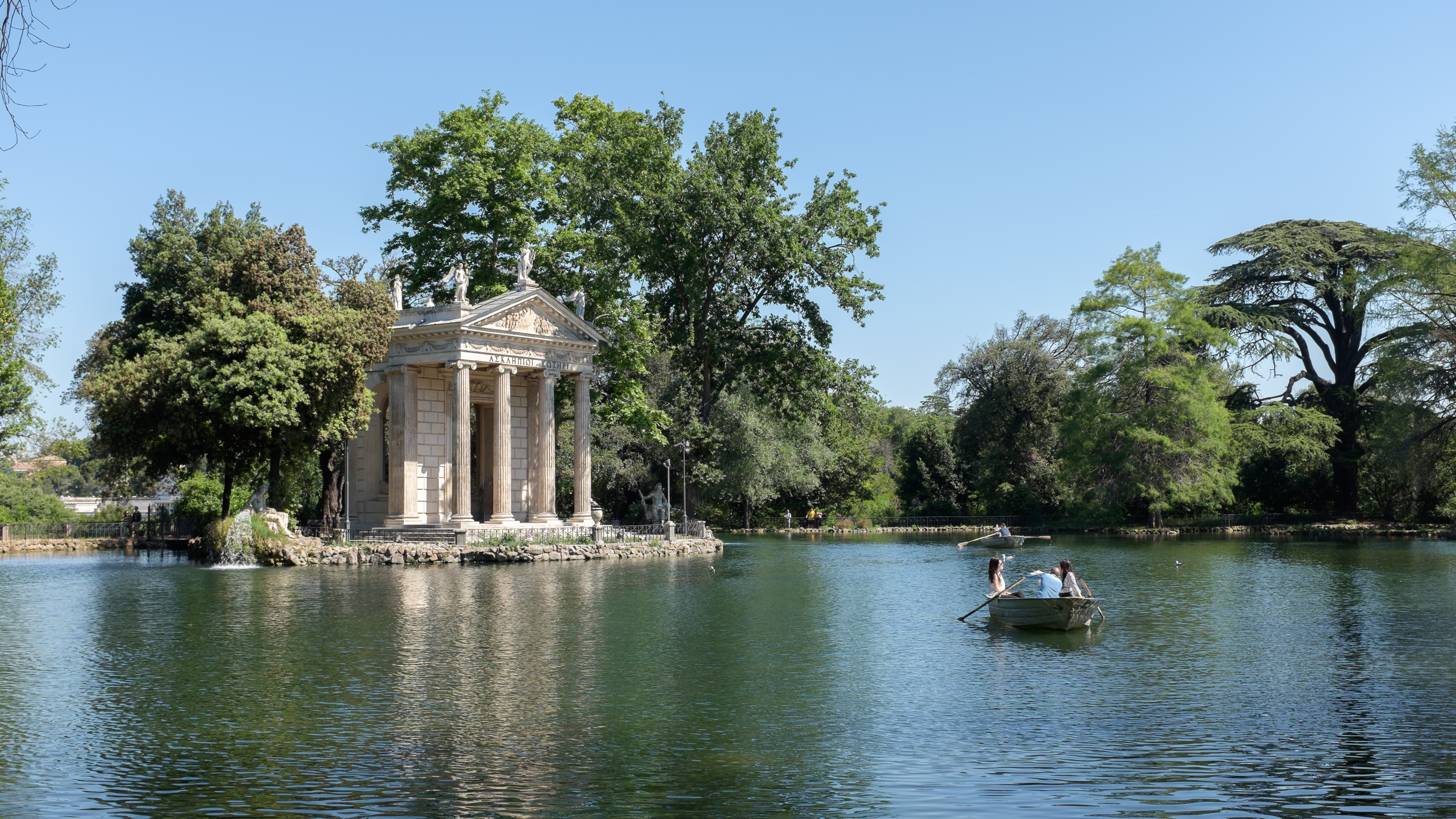
Villa Borghese gardens, Rome, showing the late 18th-century "Temple of Aesculapius", built as an eyecatcher in the manner of the lake at Stourhead

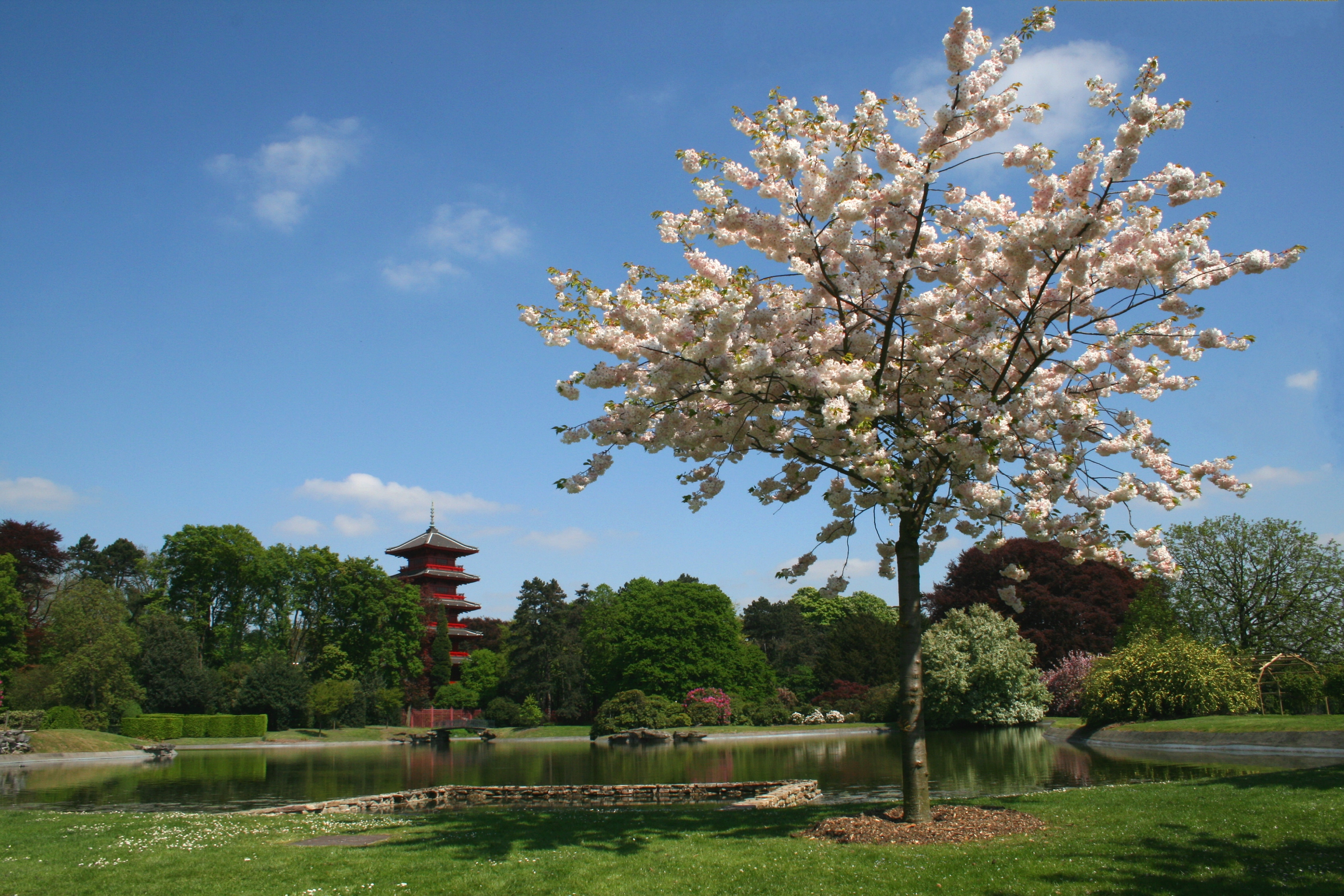
Palace of Laeken in Brussels, Belgium

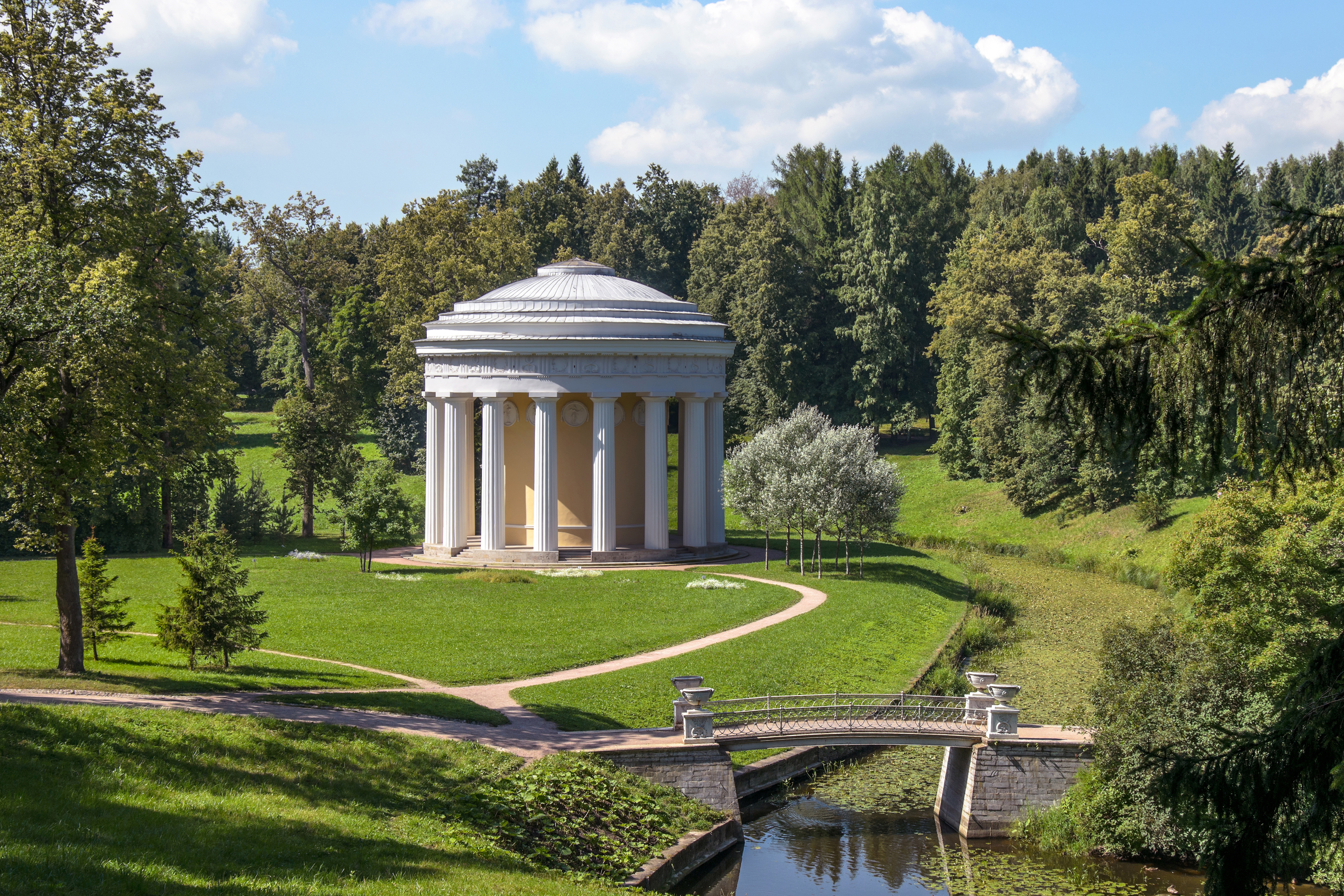
The "Temple of Friendship" in Pavlovsk Park near Saint Petersburg, Russia

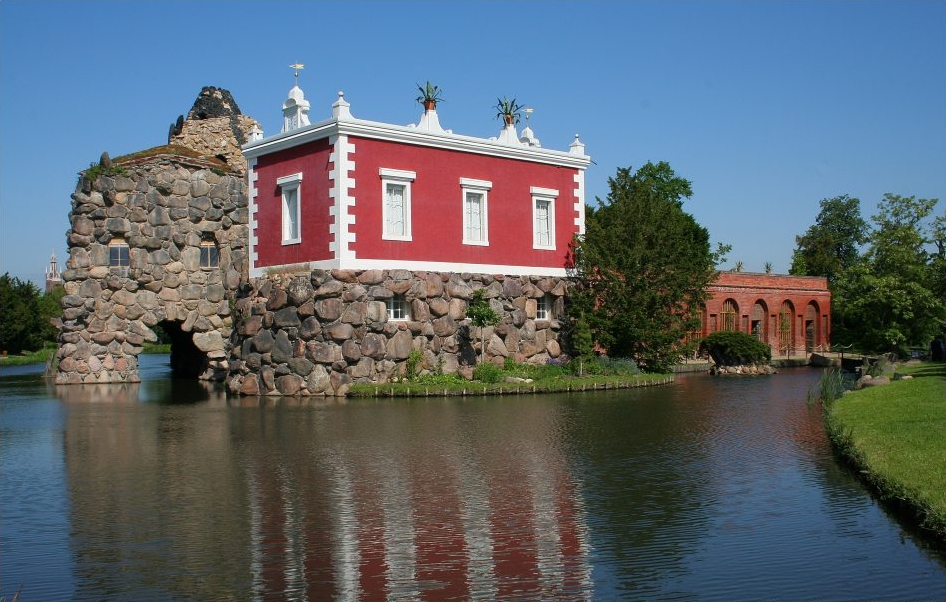
Felseninsel Stein and Villa Hamilton in Wörlitzer Park in Germany

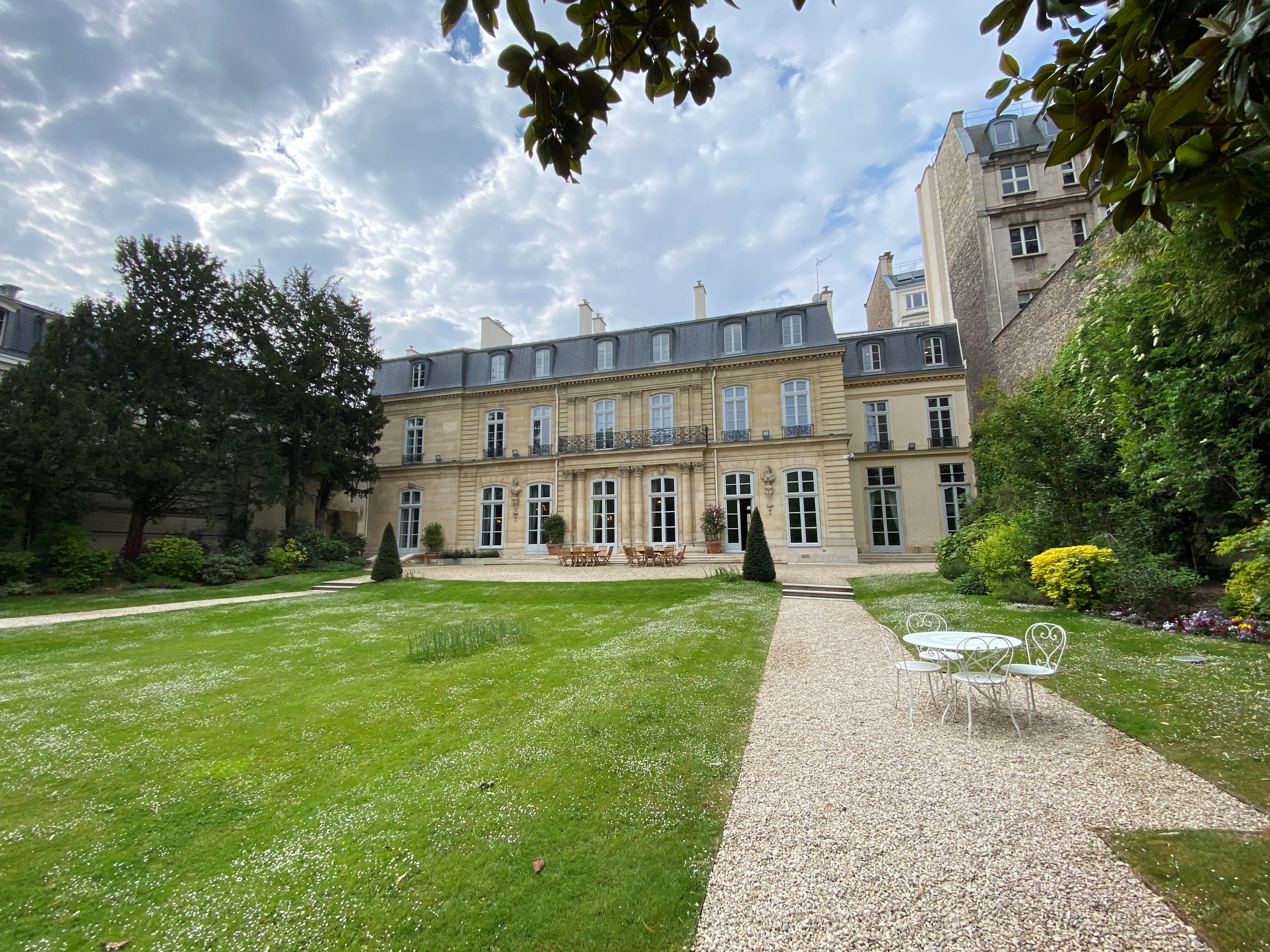
The Hôtel de Besenval has one of the oldest private English landscape gardens in Paris.

== See also ==
- German garden
- Historic garden conservation
- Italian garden
- Japanese garden
- Landscape design history
- Landscape gardens topics
- List of landscape gardens
