= Milk House (Pavlovsk) =

Architectural Monument in Pavlovsk

Coordinates: 59°41′14″N 30°27′32″E

- Молочный домик
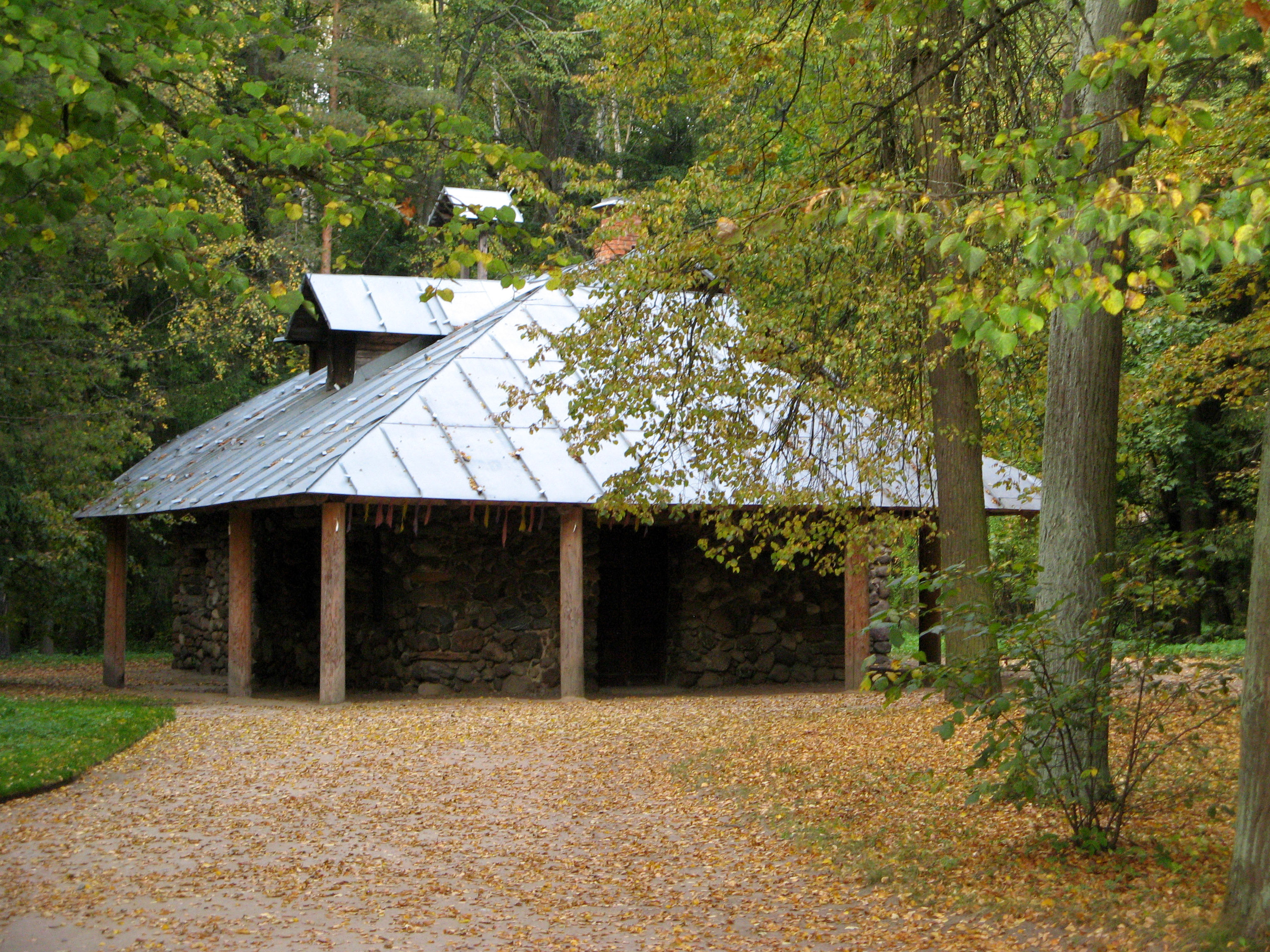
- Interactive map of Milk House
- Type: building

The Milk House (Russian: Молочный домик / Молочня) is an architectural monument located in Pavlovsk, within the central district of Pavlovsk Park. During its construction, it stood on the outskirts of the park, near the forest where cows grazed. It was designed by Charles Cameron in 1782.

Due to the ambiguous requirements, such as "If the facade is not entirely rural, it still should not be very simple ...", the project underwent several redesigns.

Initially, the pavilion served as a cow farm. It was constructed of brick with facing stones, at the request of Maria Feodorovna, who desired a building reminiscent of those from her homeland, Württemberg. The architect even received a plan of the original structure.

The farm was conceived as a romantic hut with a straw roof and a wide canopy supported by the stumps of wooden trunks. A birch tree grew through the roof, and a bell was installed on the ridge to call the cattle. The smaller half of the building was actually the cowshed; the stalls were designed for 6 cows. The second half was divided into three rooms — two for milk storage, with a stone floor, and covered with tiles made at the Smirnov factory. The third room was a luxurious hall with elegant furniture and expensive porcelain. Maria Feodorovna and her ladies-in-waiting, following the fashion, sometimes engaged in "milking," for which the cows were specially prepared and washed each time.

In 1786, a cattle yard was built nearby the Milk House, which in the early 19th century was transformed into a separate farm. The Milk House evolved into a full-fledged park pavilion, serving as a place for rest. It always contained milk, which every park visitor had the right to taste.

The building underwent frequent repairs, with particular attention paid to the straw roof. In 1895, a fire broke out in the pavilion, leading to the restoration of the roof, rafters, and ceiling afterward. In the early 1920s, another fire occurred, burning all interior finishes and wooden parts. During the restoration in 1935, the interiors were significantly simplified, and the straw roof was replaced with shingles. During the Great Patriotic War, the roof was destroyed again, after which it was restored to its original state.

== Literature ==
- Памятники архитектуры пригородов Ленинграда (in Russian). Leningrad: Стройиздат. 1985. p. 616.
- Козьмян Г. К. (1987). Чарлз Камерон. Зодчие нашего города. Leningrad: Lenizdat.
- Архангельская, Н. (1936). "Молочня". Павловск (in Russian). ОГИЗ. pp. 83–84. ISBN 978-5-04-270943-2.
