= Alexey Voloskov =

Russian painter

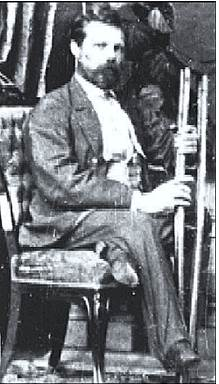
Alexey Voloskov (date unknown)

Alexey Yakovlevich Voloskov (Russian: Алексей Яковлевич Волосков; 13 March 1822, Rzhev – 19 September 1882, Rzhev) was a Russian painter; primarily of landscapes.

== Biography ==
He was born to a family of merchants. His great uncle, Terentiy Voloskov (1729–1806), was the inventor of an early astronomical clock that showed phases of the moon and calculated dates for the church calendar, among other things.

A childhood illness (probably polio) left him unable to walk without the aid of crutches. In 1837, he began auditing classes at the Imperial Academy of Arts; notably, the landscape painting workshops of Maxim Vorobyov. In 1843, he was awarded a silver medal and was granted the title of "Free Artist" in 1845. He became a member of the academy in 1851 and used his position there to help struggling young artists.

Later, he lived in Ukraine, where he executed commissions for the philanthropist, Hryhoriy Galagan and other members of the local nobility. In 1863, after an illness, he returned to Rzhev and married the daughter of a local priest. Not quite able to support his family by painting, he served as a notary and was the agent for a Moscow insurance company.

A major retrospective of his work was held at the Russian Museum in 2006–2007.

== Selected paintings ==
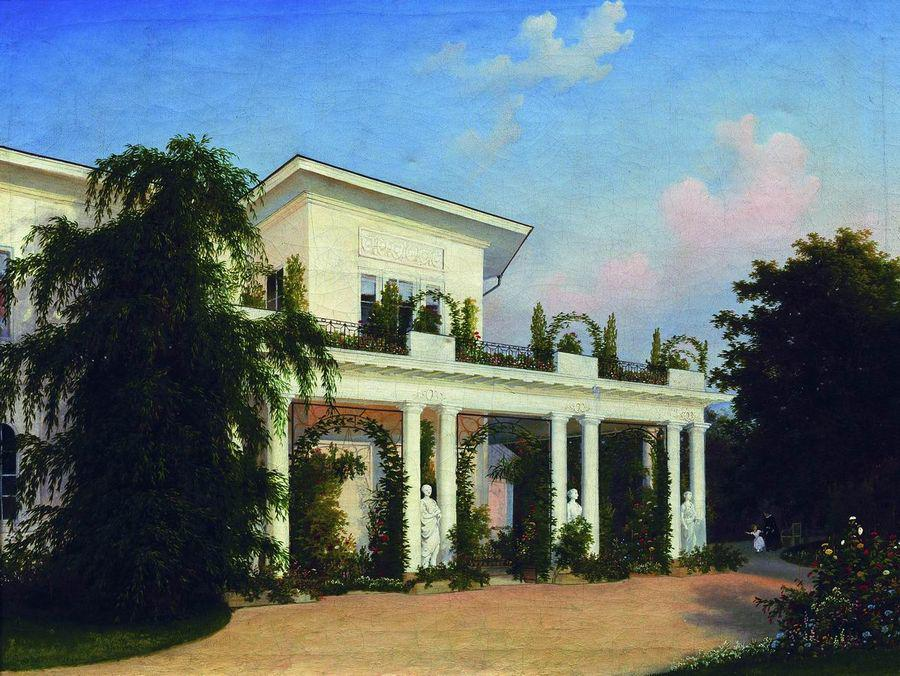
Kachanivka

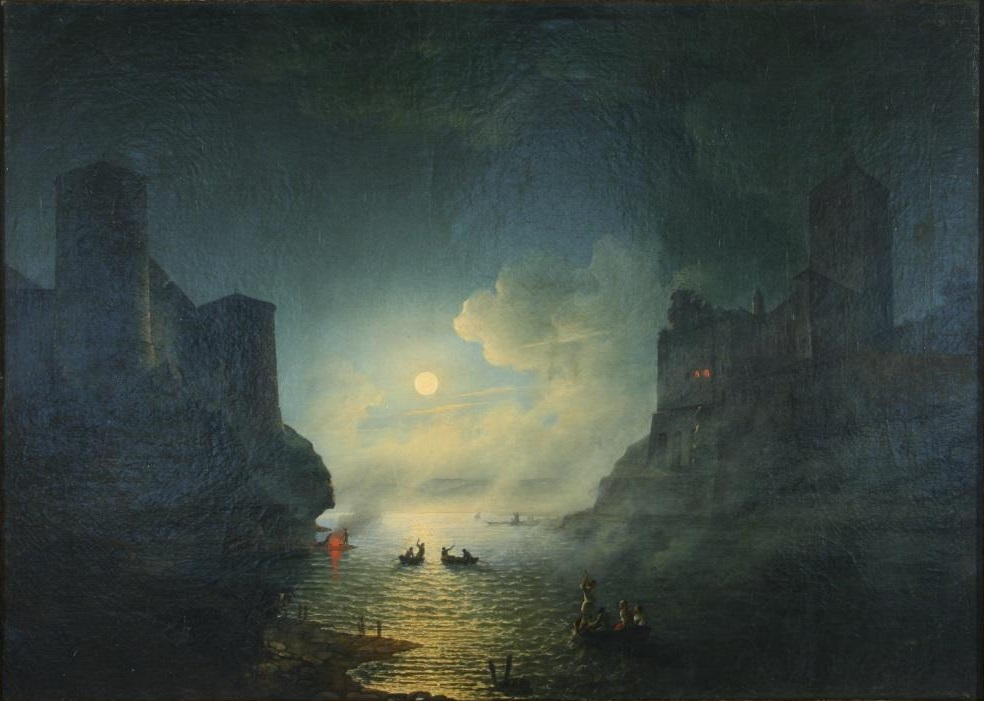
The Night Sea at Vyborg

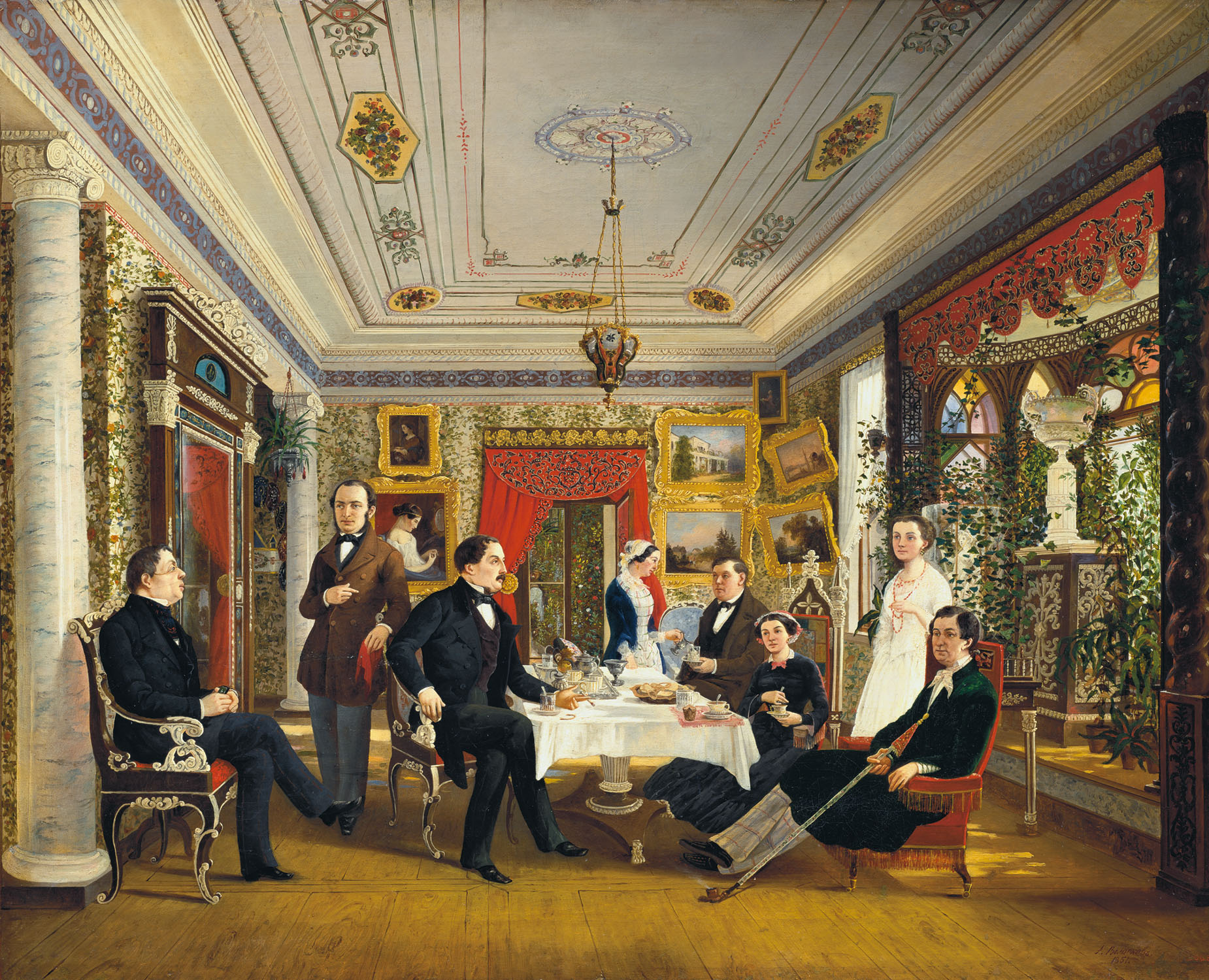
At the Tea Table
(The Tarnovsky Family)

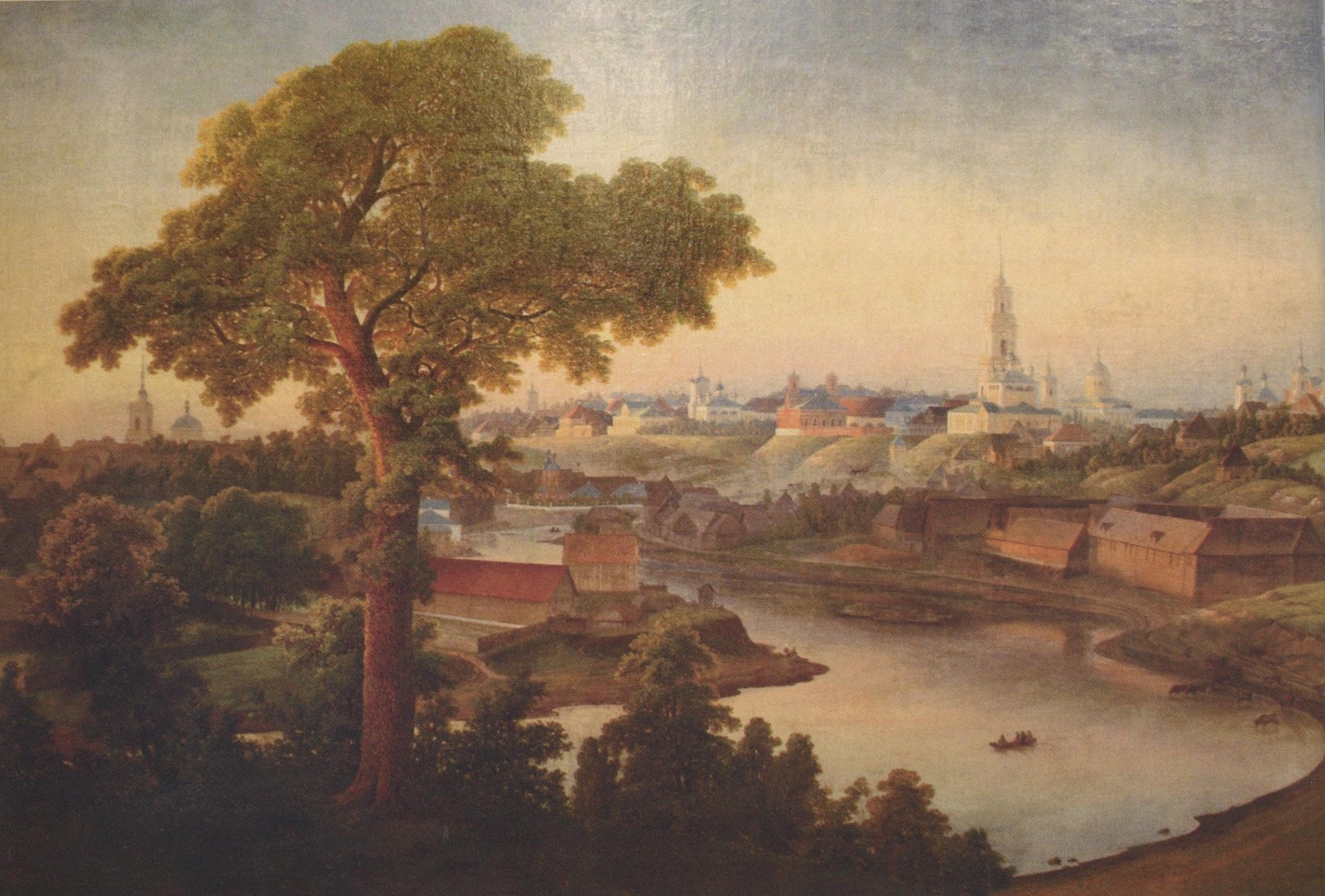
View of Rzhev
