= Boris and Gleb Cathedral, Chernihiv =

Church building in Chernihiv, Ukraine

Boris and Gleb Cathedral
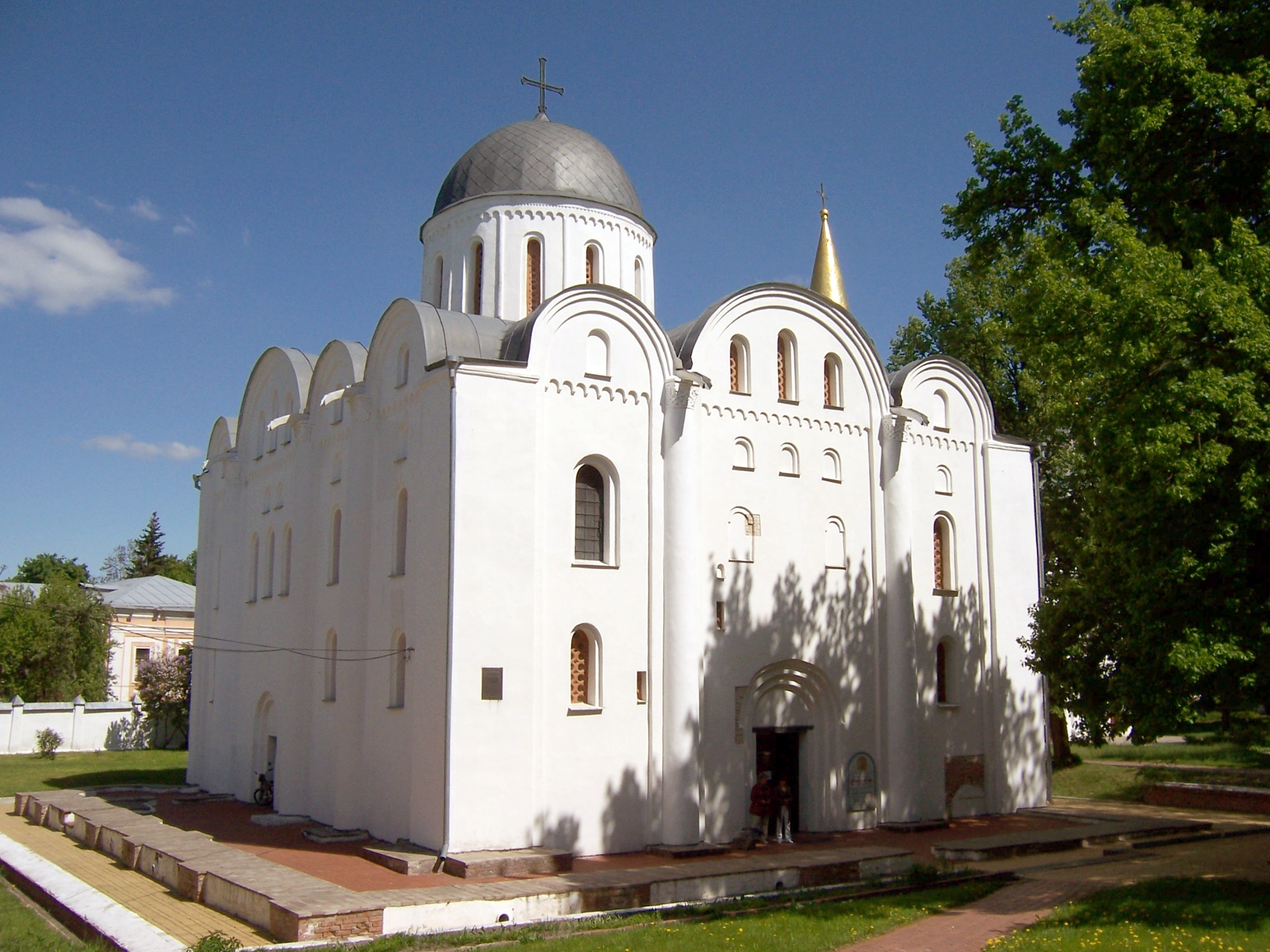
- Boris and Gleb Cathedral
- 51°29′21″N 31°18′25″E
- Location: Dytynets Park, Chernihiv
- Country: Ukraine

History
- Founder: Davyd Sviatoslavich

Architecture
- Architectural type: Church
- Style: Kievan Rus' with Romanesque elements
- Completed: Between 1120 and 1123

Immovable Monument of National Significance of Ukraine
- Official name: Борисоглібський собор (Boris and Gleb Cathedral)
- Type: Architecture
- Reference no.: 250052

The Boris and Gleb Cathedral (Ukrainian: Собор Бориса й Гліба), also known as Borysohlibskyi Cathedral (Ukrainian: Борисоглібський собор), is a former church and an architectural monument in Chernihiv, Ukraine of the pre-Mongol era. It is located next to the Transfiguration Cathedral in Dytynets Park.

== History ==
The construction of the church was ordered by Davyd Sviatoslavich in 1120, and he was buried there in 1123. The cathedral was constructed on the site of an older building, as shown by remains of the building's foundations.

Boris and Gleb Cathedral was damaged and reconstructed several times throughout its existence. In the beginning of 17th century, the building was rebuilt into a Dominican church by the Poles. An octagonal rotunda-narthex was added to the western facade in the style of Ukrainian Baroque in 17th century. In the beginning of 18th century, by order of Hetman Mazepa, Philipp Jacob Drentwett of Augsburg made the silver royal doors of the church. The church was damaged significantly during WWII. In 1952–1958, the building was restored to its original appearance according to the project by M. V. Kholostenko. The frescoes that covered the walls of the church have hardly survived to this day.

The cathedral has been on the UNESCO World Heritage Site tentative list since 1989. Currently, the museum of Ancient Chernihiv reserve is located on the territory of the church.

== Gallery ==
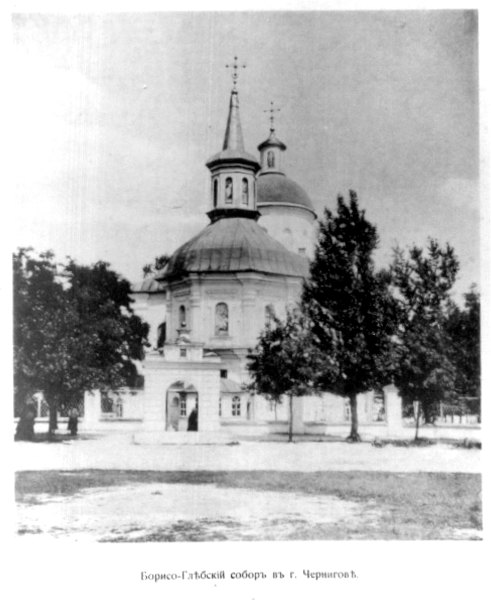
Boris and Gleb Cathedral before the restoration

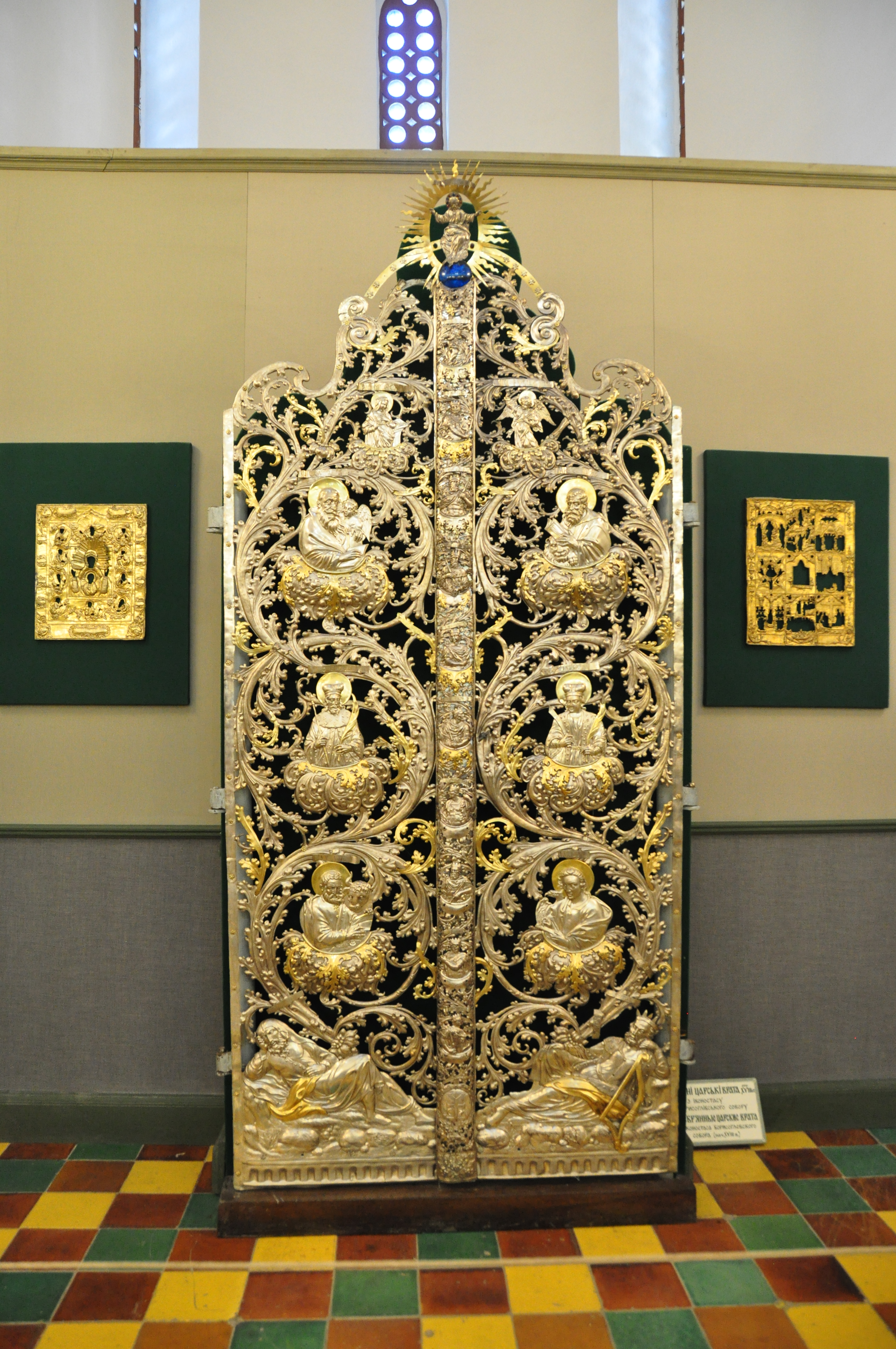
Royal doors

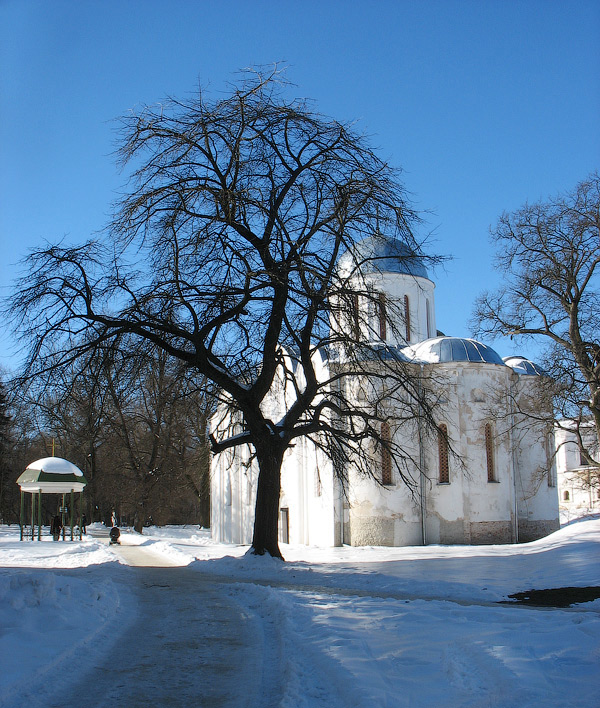
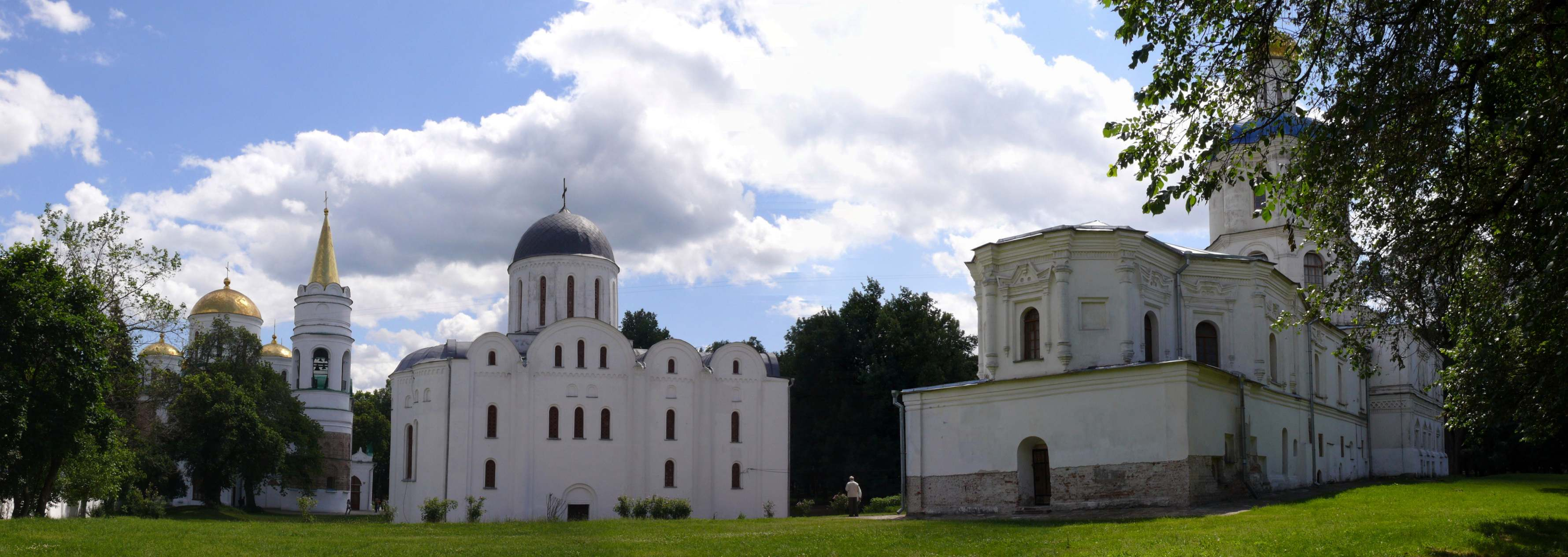
From left to right: Transfiguration Cathedral, Boris and Gleb Cathedral, Chernihiv Collegium

== See also ==
- List of churches and monasteries in Chernihiv
- Ancient Chernihiv
