= House of Lyzohub (Colonel of the Chernihiv's Regiment) =

- Будинок полкової канцелярії
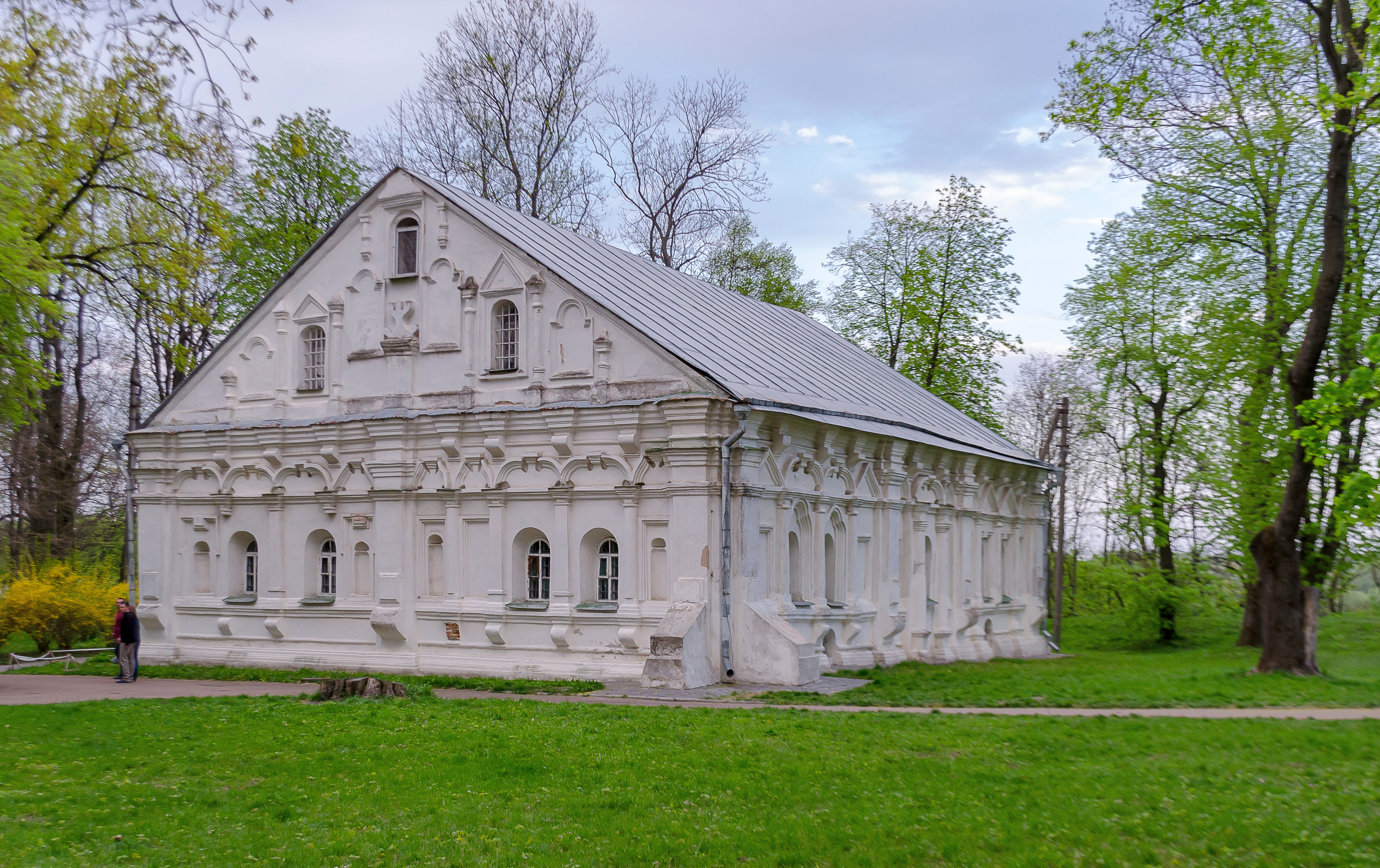

General information
- Architectural style: Ukrainian Baroque
- Location: Dytynets Park, Chernihiv, Ukraine
- Completed: 1690s

Immovable Monument of National Significance of Ukraine
- Official name: Будинок полкової канцелярії (Будинок Я. Лизогуба) (House of the Regimental Office (House of Y. Lyzohub))
- Type: Architecture
- Reference no.: 250046

The House of Lyzohub (Ukrainian: Будинок Чернігівської полкової канцелярії, or Будинок Лизогуба, romanized: Budynok Chernihivskoi polkovoi kantseliarii, Budynok Lyzohuba), named after Yakiv Lyzohub, Colonel of Chernihiv Regiment, is an architectural monument of national importance and local history in Chernihiv located in the Dytynets Park.

== History ==
Decree of the Council of Ministers of the Ukrainian SSR dated August 24, 1963 No. 970 was given the status of an architectural monument of national significance with security No. 814 called the House of the Regimental Office.

By the decision of the executive committee of the Chernihiv Oblast Council of People's Deputies of Workers dated 11/17/1980 No. 551, the status of a local historical monument with security No. 44 called the House was assigned, where the office of the Chernigov Cossack regiment was located in the 18th century.

By order of the Department of Culture and Tourism, Nationalities and Religions of the Chernihiv Regional State Administration dated June 7, 2019 No. 223, the name of the monument is the House of the Chancellery of the Chernihiv Cossack Regiment. There is an information board on the building.

== Description ==
It is one of the few examples of Ukrainian housing architecture of the late 17th century that have survived to this day; it is also one of the two administrative buildings of the offices of the Cossack regiments that have been preserved to this day. Another preserved is the house of the office of the Kiev Cossack regiment in Kozelets.

The building was built in the 1690s on the territory of Dytynets on the south side of the city square. One-story, brick, rectangular house, with a gable roof. The architectural style is Ukrainian baroque. The main facade is directed to the north. The end facades end with triangular pediments.

Small "white" and "black" vestibules divide the house into male (western) and female (eastern) sides, each with two rooms. This is a developed plan of a typical Ukrainian "hut in two halves". Under the rooms there is a 6-chamber cellar, the entrance to which was originally in one of the inner walls (vault). A staircase in another wall (vault) led to the attic. Presumably, the house began to be built as a two-story house, as evidenced by the high end gables with windows. The decoration of the facades is enriched and complicated from the eastern facade to the western and main northern ones. The masterful use of bricks is a characteristic feature of the architecture of the Left Bank of the 17th and 18th centuries, continuing the Rus' tradition that began in the ornamental lacework of the brickwork of the Transfiguration Cathedral, the Piatnytska Church and others.

It was damaged during the fires of 1718 and 1750. In the 18th century, a vestibule with a figured front was added from the northern facade. In the 19th century, the stoves were dismantled, windows were pierced in the eastern and western walls, the southern exit was transferred to the window, the tiled roof was replaced with a tin one.

The house in the period 1687-1698 belonged to the Chernigov colonel Yakov Kondratievich Lizogub. Then it belonged to Hetman Ivan Stepanovich Mazepa. The purpose of the building has changed many times. In the late 17th - early 18th centuries, the office of the Chernihiv Cossack regiment was located here, then - the Chernihiv City Hall, after the 18th - early 20th centuries - the archive.

After the restoration of 1954, the house was included in the Chernihiv architectural and historical reserve - now the national historical and architectural reserve "Ancient Chernihiv". In 1969 the house was again restored.

== Gallery ==
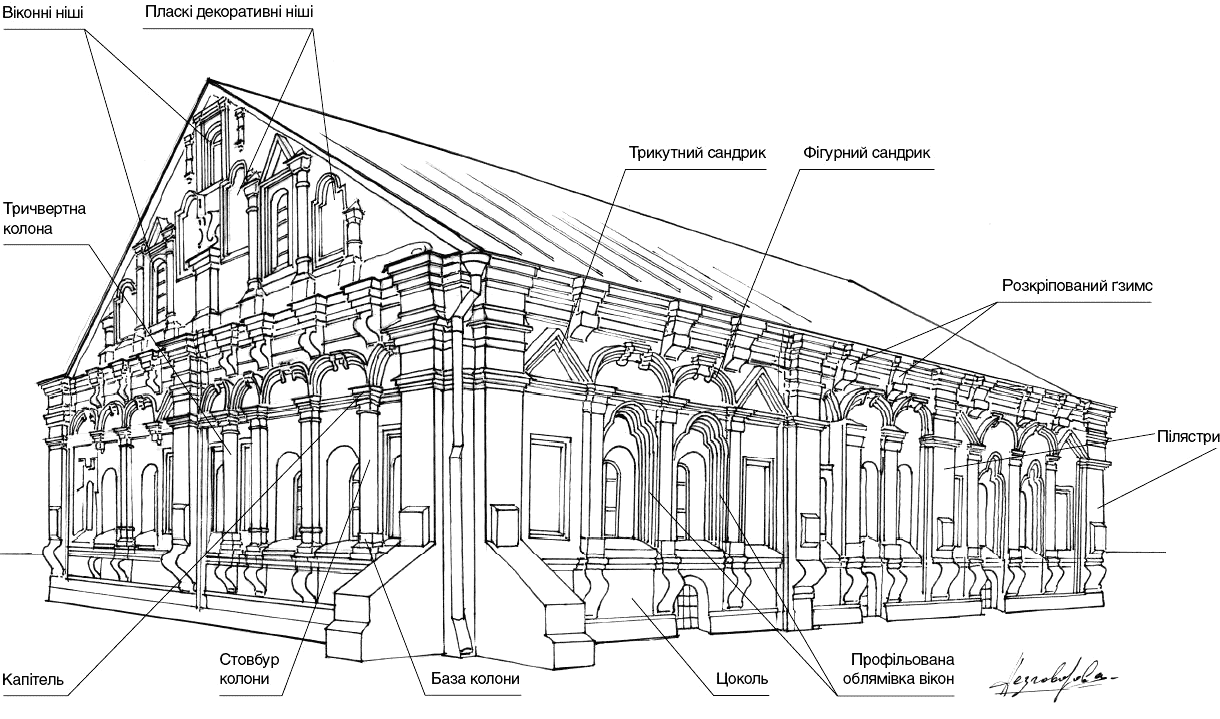

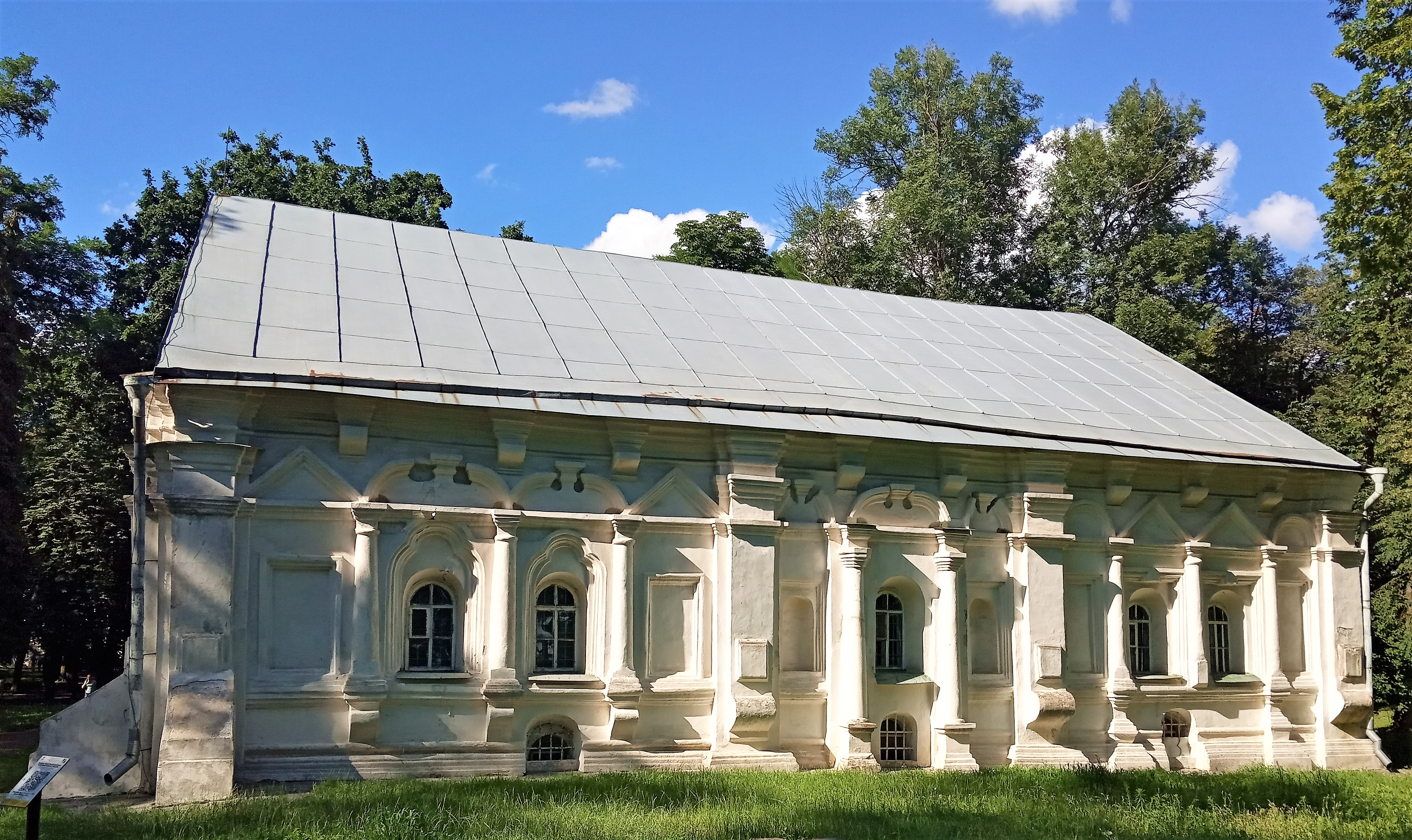

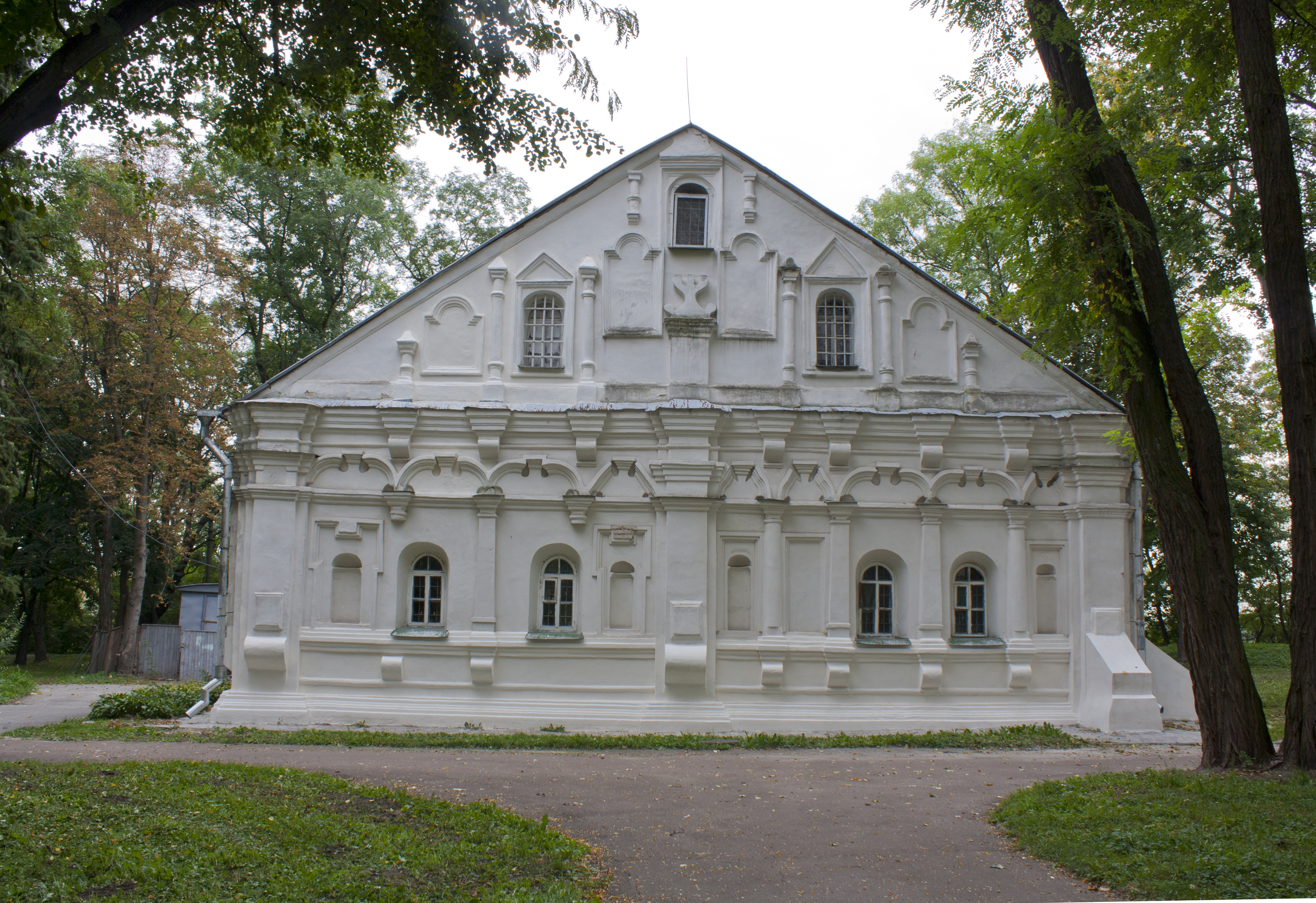

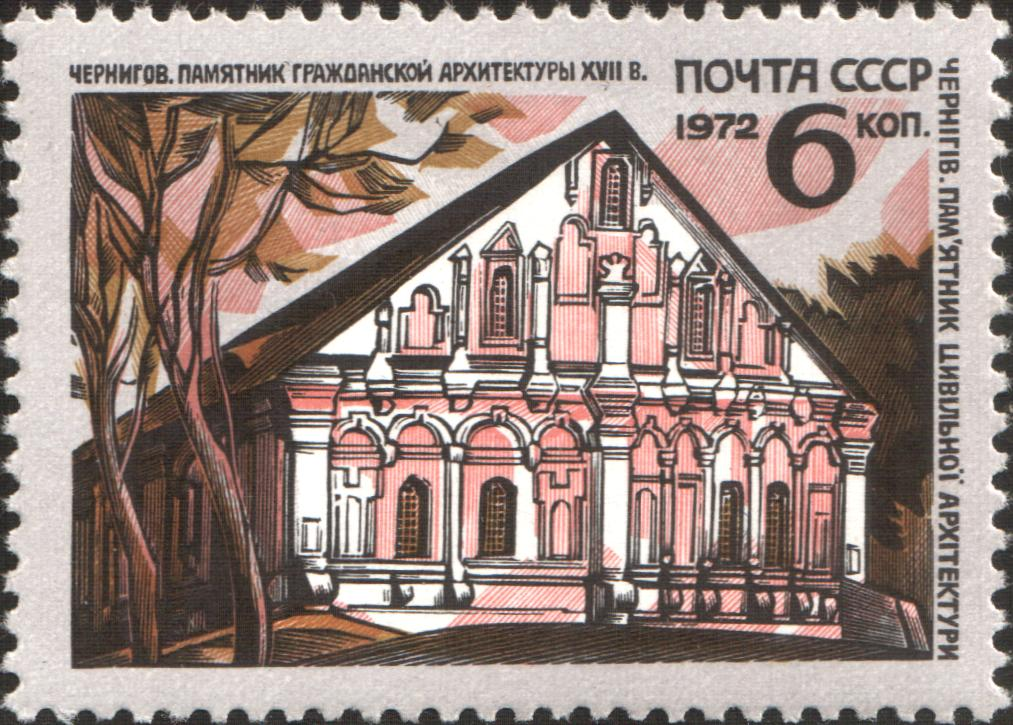

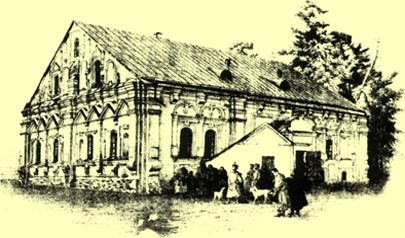
