= Dytynets Park =

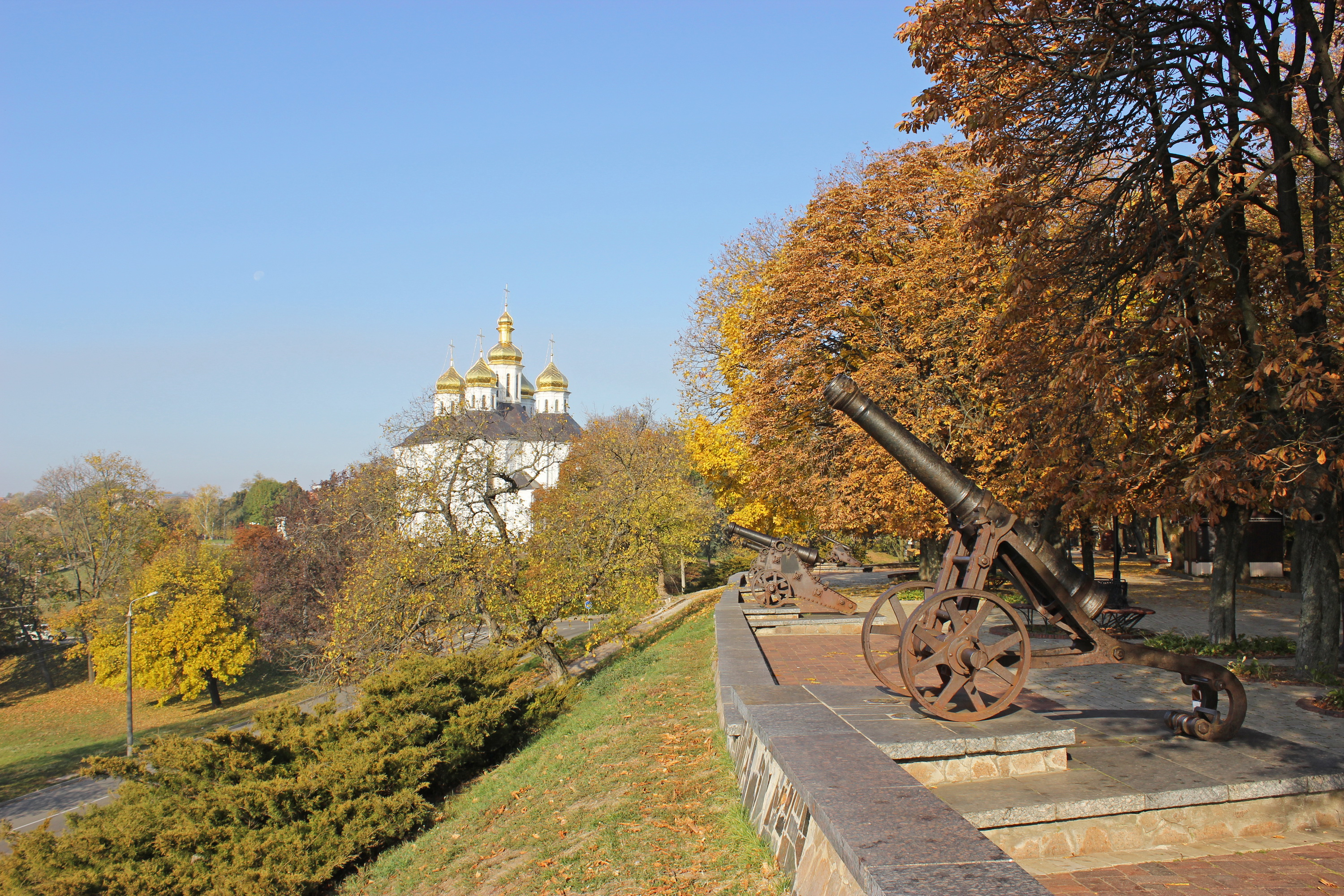
- Interactive map of Dytynets Park
- Location: 1 Preobrazhenska Street, Chernihiv, Chernihiv Oblast, Ukraine, 14000
- Coordinates: 51°29′13″N 31°18′19″E
- Created: 1662; 364 years ago
- Status: Open all year

Immovable Monument of National Significance of Ukraine
- Official name: Дитинець літописного міста Чернігова (Dytynets of the legendary city of Chernihiv)
- Type: Archaeology
- Reference no.: 250001-Н

The Dytynets Park is a park in Chernihiv located on the site of the Chernihiv dytynets, the Kievan Rus'-era fortified region of the city. It is a hill on the bank of the Desna River, where a defense complex is situated. The park houses numerous churches and cathedrals. At the viewing point, there are 12 cast-iron bastion cannons from the 17th century, which are the calling card of the city. Dytynets Park also has a number of restaurants.

Across the street from Dytynets Park, the Catherine's Church from the beginning of the 18th century is situated. With onion-shaped golden domes, it is one of the best examples of the Ukrainian Baroque.

== History ==
The first fortifications were formed here in the 8th century on the site of a more ancient settlement. Chernihiv soon became one of the most significant cities, as evidenced by its mention under 907 in the Tale of Bygone Years. In the agreement between Oleg and Byzantium, he is mentioned as the second most important after Kyiv.

Dytynets occupied the entire southwestern section of the cape (about 11 hectares). It was surrounded by an earthen rampart with a wooden wall and a deep moat, had three entrances: Vodiana, Kyivska and Pohorila Gates. Dytynets housed the princely court, rich estates of the wealthy nobility and the main cathedrals of the city. The fact that the Dytynets was built up to a large extent by stone structures, in addition to the Transfiguration Cathedral and the Boris and Gleb Cathedral, which were preserved to this day, is also evidenced by the remains of the princely courtyard of the 10th century, consisting of two stone towers from two to three floors, and its episcopal courtyard of the 12th century with stone wall and gate church. Pagan, and after the 10th century, Christian clergy enjoyed significant influence in the city. The pagan temple was probably located on the territory of the Dytynets, where at the beginning of the 17th century two silver idols were found. From the north and west, Okolny Grad adjoined the Dytynets—the most populated handicraft and trading part of Chernihiv, not inferior in area to the City of Yaroslav in Kyiv. It was surrounded by powerful walls after the battle of Listvy, when Chernihiv became the center of a vast principality. At the foot of the Dytynets on the river side was an extensive Chernihiv hem, part of which (probably the area of the ancient pier) was fortified with a shaft with wooden structures. The edges of the Desna and Stryzhen terraces were fairly densely built up.

In 12th century, the area of the Dytynets expanded significantly, which amounted to 16 ha. The original moat, which was located 70 m east of the Transfiguration Cathedral, was filled up and the Dytynets expanded eastward. At the same time, the border of Okolnoy Grad expanded to the east, the area of which reached 40 ha. On the west side, the Tretyak adjoined the Dytynets – an independent fortified section of the Okolny Grad with an area of 20 ha. To the north and west of Okolny Castle there was a vast Pisgorodor fortified with a stockade, rampart, and moat.

In October 1239, the city was burned by the hordes of Khan Mengu. The fortifications were strengthened by the Grand Duke of Lithuania Vytautas in the 14th century. The city suffered great damage from the Crimean Khanate in 1482 and 1497.

In 1500, the lands of Severia, along with Chernigov, were seized by the Grand Duchy of Moscow. During the 16th century, the city repeatedly became the object of Lithuanian-Polish attacks, but all of them were repulsed. Since the old fortifications fell into disrepair, in 1531, by decree of Grand Duke Vasili III, the construction of a new wooden Kremlin kid's building with five high towers, a deep moat and an underground passage to the Strizhen River was completed by decree of the cape protruding to the side of the Desna. The armament in the fortress consisted of 27 guns, and its garrison numbered about 1000 people. Three years later, the fortress successfully withstood the Lithuanian siege. After a series of sieges during the Livonian War, the injured Chernigov Dytynets were again rebuilt and strengthened in 1584–1592. The street from Pogoreloy (North) has become the main one. Administrative houses, barracks and an artillery yard were erected along it.

Chernihiv suffered Polish ruin during the Time of Troubles in 1611, when units of the Kyiv subcommittee Samuel Ermine tricked into the city and completely burned it.

After the Khmelnytsky Uprising and the Russo-Polish War (1654–1667), the Chernihiv fortress became the administrative and political center of the Chernihiv regiment, while preserving the significance of the fortress at the same time. Here in the 17th century the house of Colonel Jacob Lizogub was built.

In the 18th century Dytynets built up with new buildings. The predominant element of the composition was the Chernihiv Collegium with a bell tower. In 1799 the fortress was liquidated. According to the new building plan of Chernigov, at the beginning of the 19th century, the ramparts of the fortress were partially excavated. In their place, a boulevard is broken. After 1845, a park called Val was founded on the site of Dytynets and the Chernihiv fortress. Two squares were created: Gymnasium and Cathedral.

Since 1964, the modern name of the park has been adopted – Central Park of Culture and Rest named after M. Kotsyubinsky, and the monuments on its territory became part of the National Chernihiv ancient architectural and historical reserve. One of the main attractions of the children is the cannons from the bastions of the Chernihiv fortress, donated by the legend to the city of Peter I. There are 12 guns in total.

== Monuments ==
- Saviour-Transfiguration Cathedral is the first brick church in Chernihiv, and one of the first in Kievan Rus'.
- Church of Boris and Gleb – a brick church built during the reign of Prince David Svyatoslavovich of Chernihiv.
- Mazepa's house, or Lyzohub's house, later became the house of the Regiment Chancellery.
- Chernihiv Collegium is the first higher education institution on the left bank of Ukraine.
- The building of the Chernihiv Men's Gymnasium was built in 1804, one of the first educational institutions in the city of Chernihiv.
- The building of the Chernihiv Women's Gymnasium is now the Chernihiv Regional Art Museum
- Cast iron bastion guns – 12 pieces, cast in the XVIII century.
- The Archbishop's House is the first building in the city built in the style of classicism. Now the regional state archive.
- Monument to Taras Shevchenko.
- Monument to Ivan Mazepa – the first monument to Ivan Mazepa erected in the city, in August 2009, by the sculptor Gennady Jerszow.
- The memorial stone "To the Fighters for the Freedom of Ukraine" was erected in October 1992.

== Gallery ==
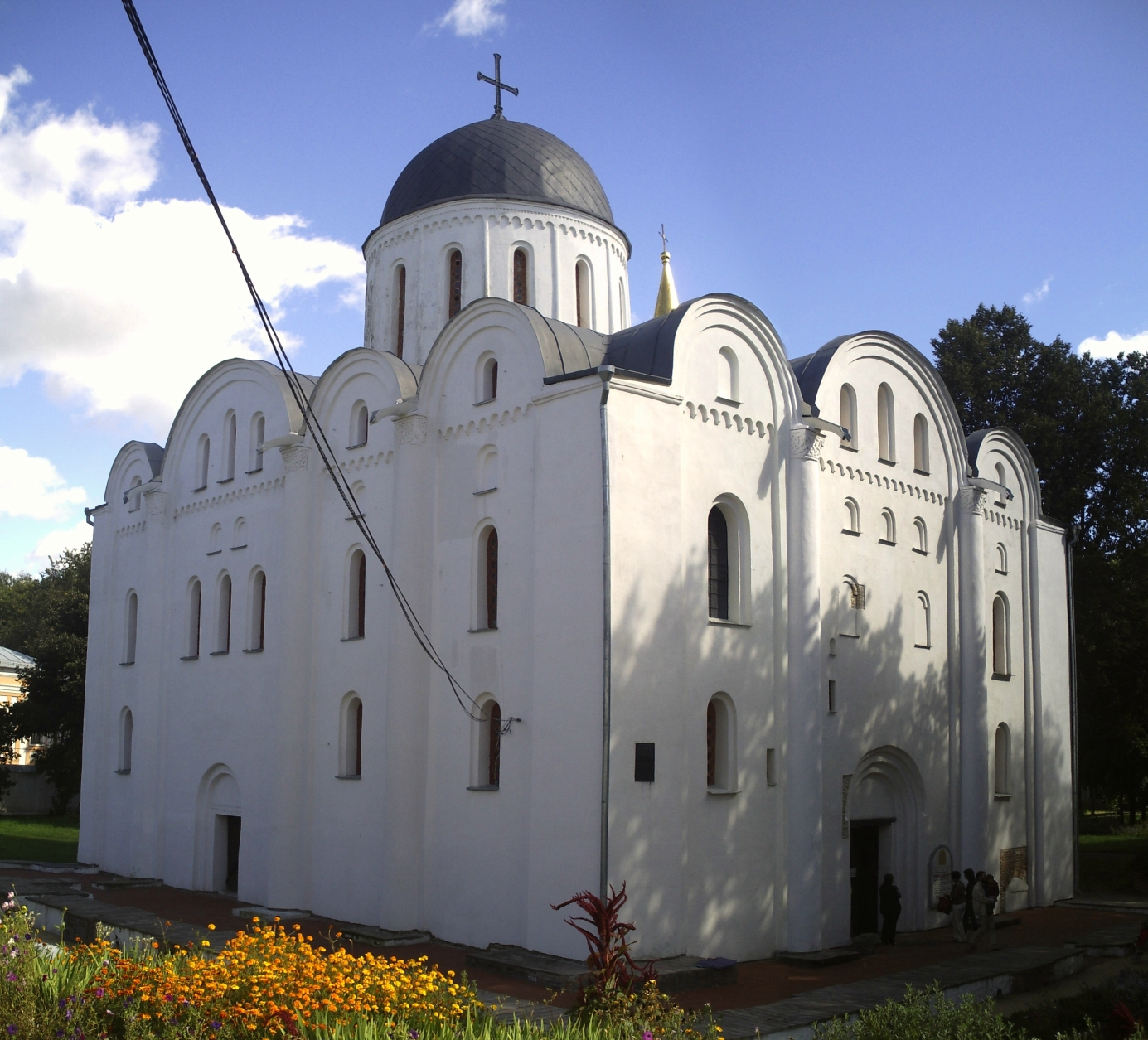
Boris and Gleb Cathedral

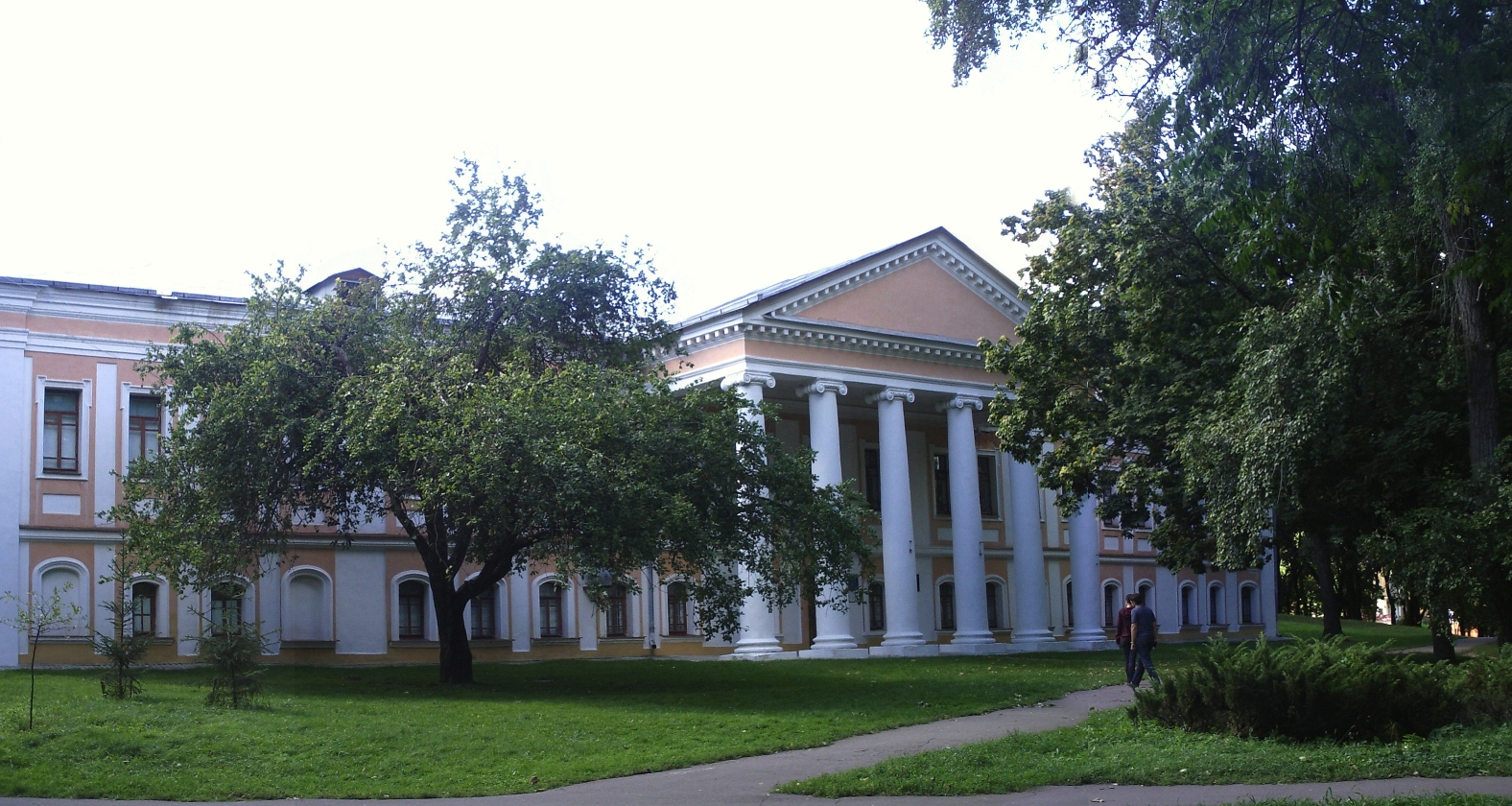
Archbishop's Residence

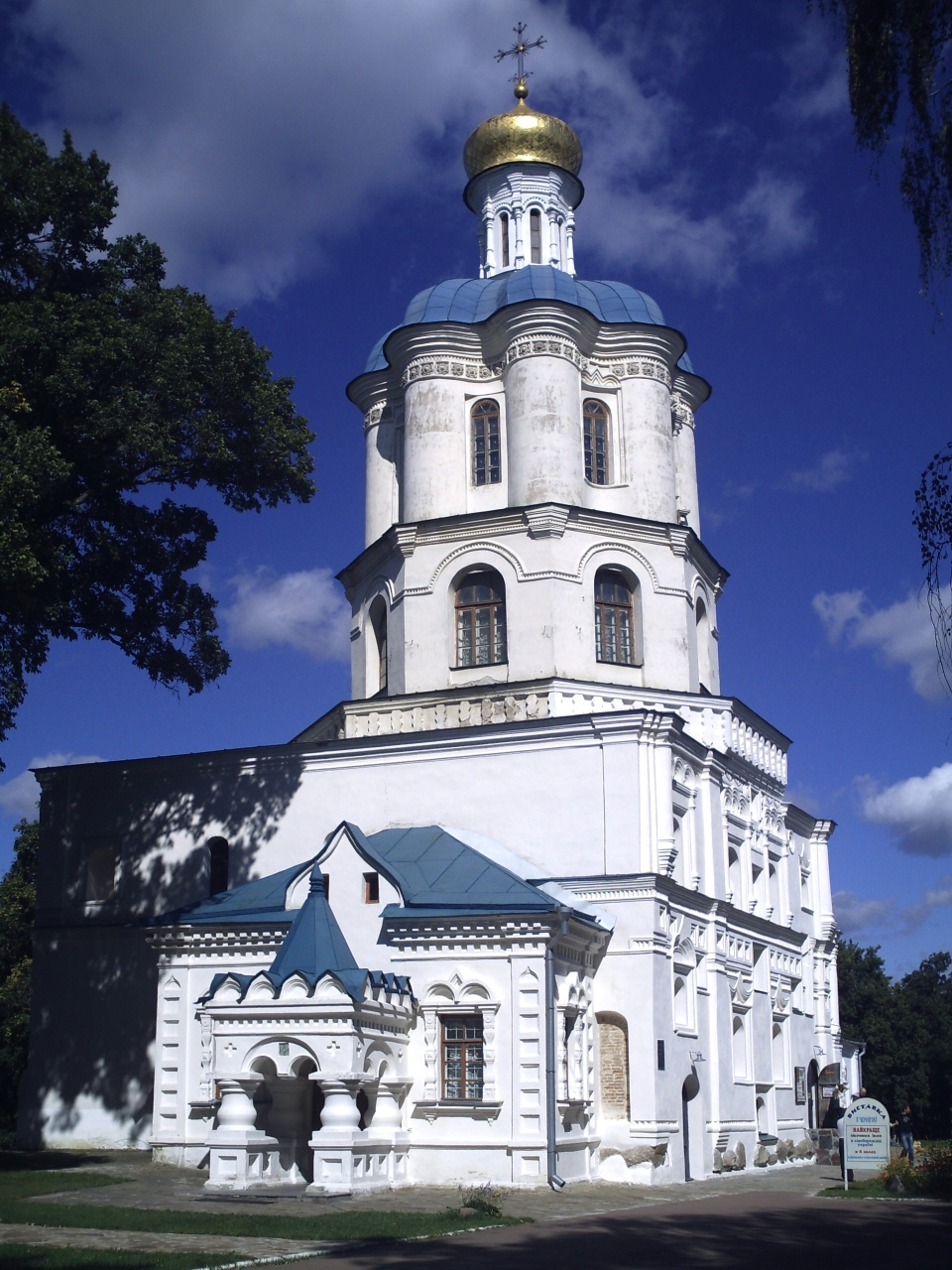
Chernihiv Collegium

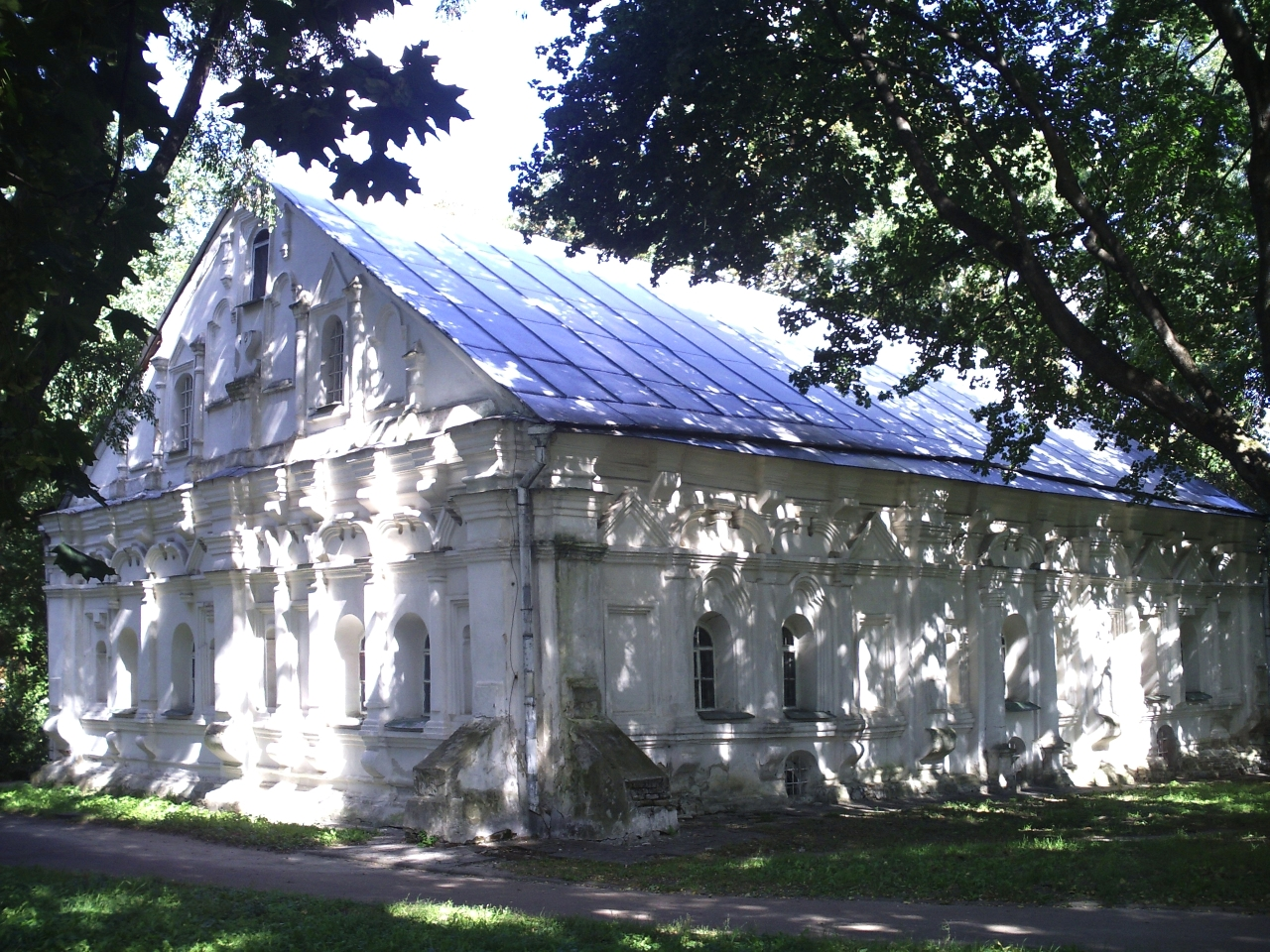
House of Lyzohub

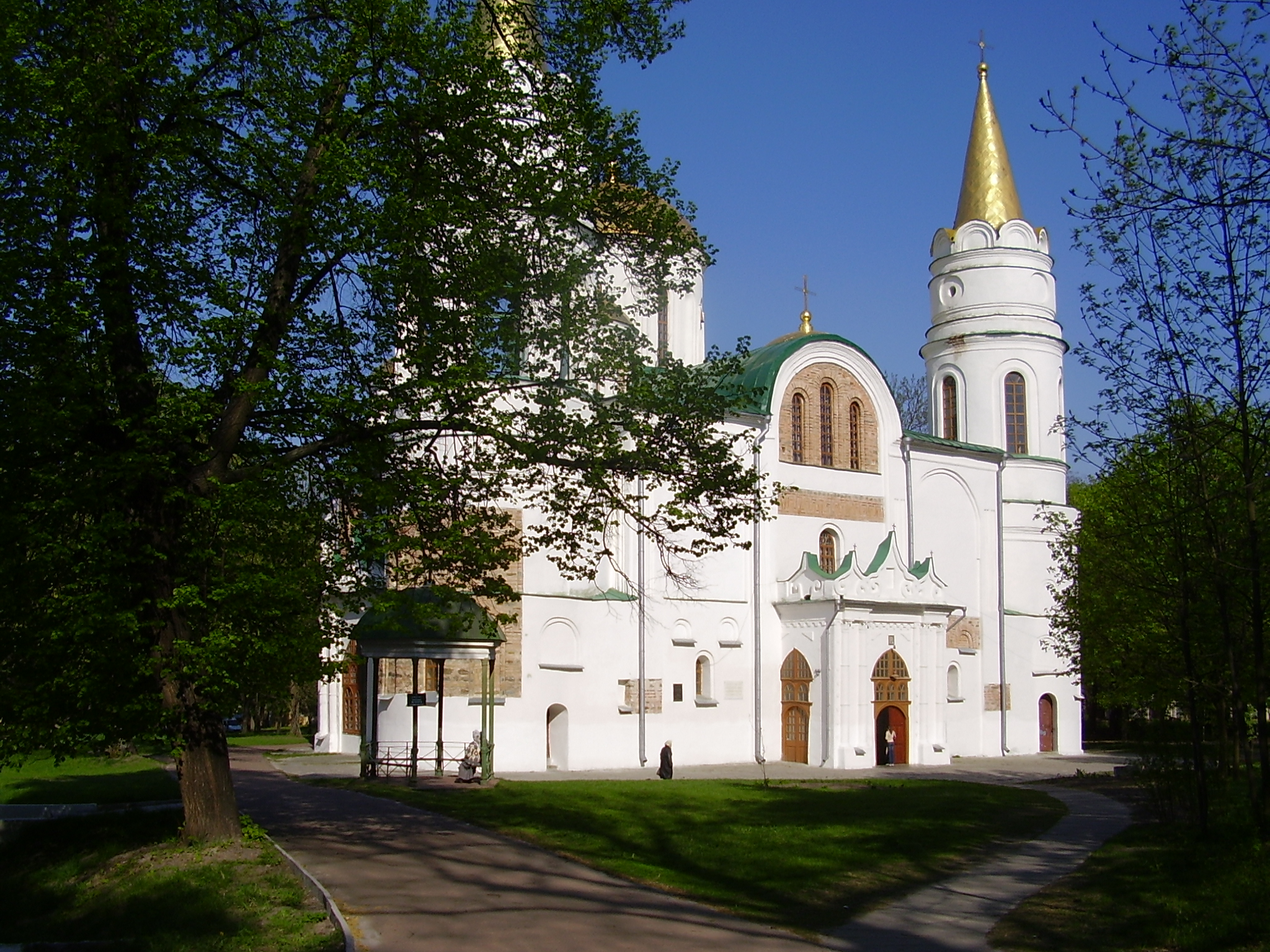
Saviour-Transfiguration Cathedral

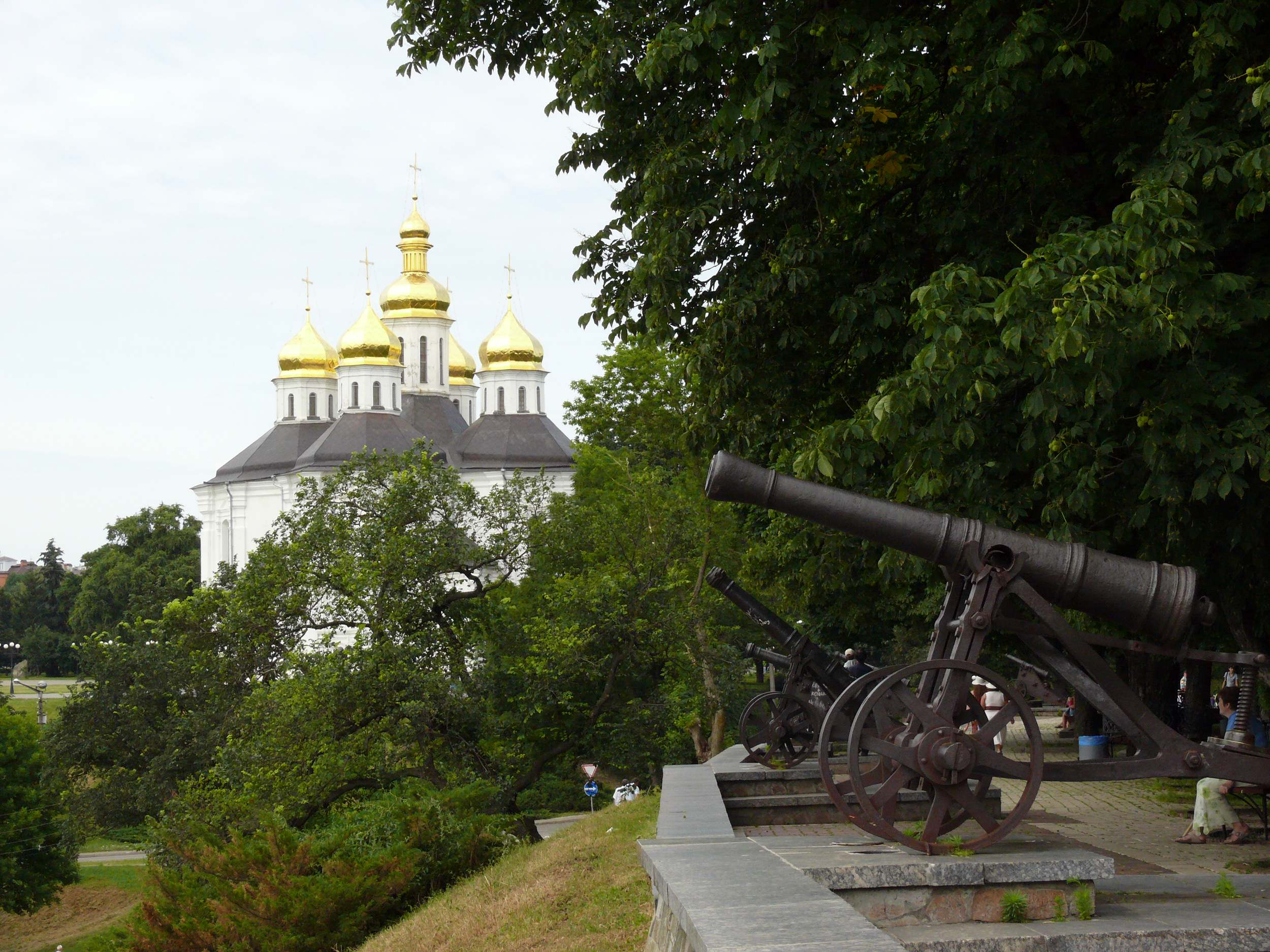
Cannon of 18th century on the shaft, with St. Catherine's Church in the background

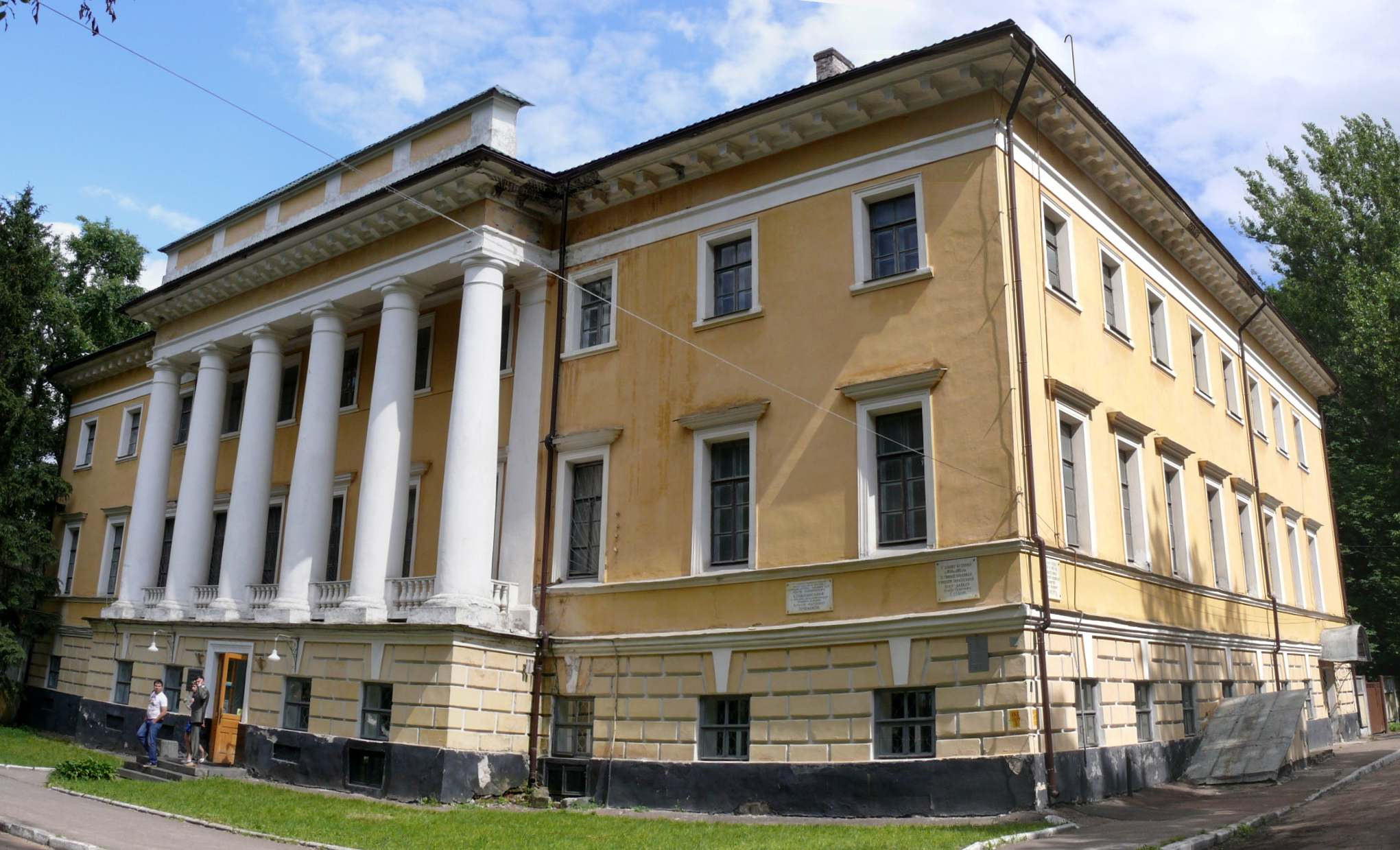
Chernihiv Regional Art Museum

== See also ==
- List of parks and gardens in Chernihiv
