= Chernihiv Collegium =

Monument in Chernihiv, Ukraine

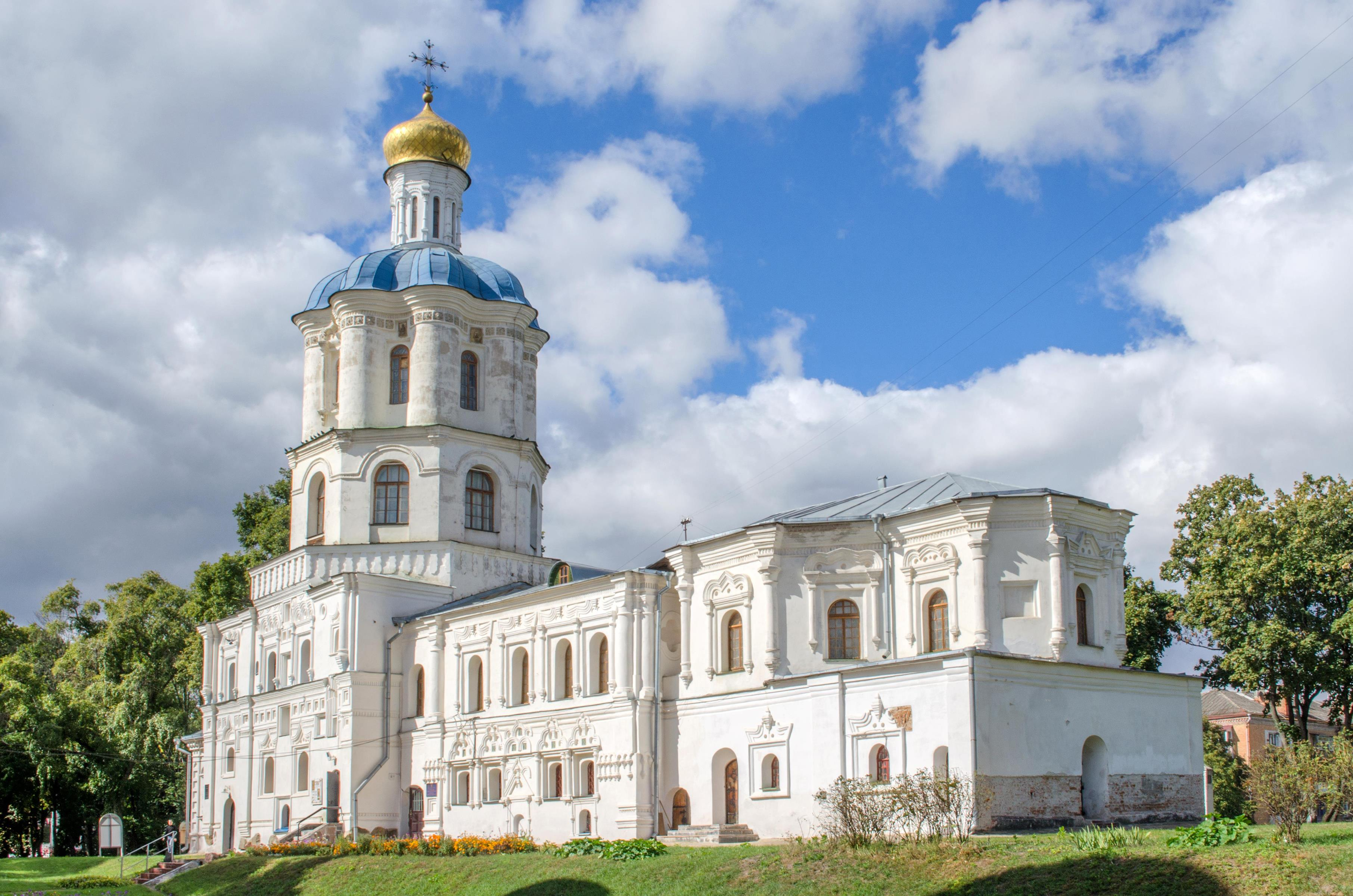
- Collegium building

General information
- Type: Architectural monument
- Architectural style: Ukrainian baroque
- Location: Chernihiv, Ukraine, Dytynets Park
- Coordinates: 51°29′21″N 31°18′22″E
- Construction started: 1700

Immovable Monument of National Significance of Ukraine
- Official name: Колегіум (Collegium)
- Type: Architecture
- Reference no.: 250050

The Chernihiv Collegium (Ukrainian: Чернігівський колегіум) was one of the first educational institutions in the Cossack Hetmanate to provide complete secondary and, subsequently, higher spiritual education on the left bank of the Dnieper. In the period of its highest prosperity, the collegium became a major educational and intellectual center and gained fame in Russia as “Chernigov Athens”. In historiography, the Chernihiv Collegium is considered one of the "first offspring" of the Kyiv-Mohyla Collegium. The collegium is located in the center of Chernihiv, on the edge of the rampart of the former fortress, next to the St. Boris and Gleb Cathedral at the Dytynets Park.

== Description ==
An architectural monument of national importance, according to the Decree of the Council of Ministers of the Ukrainian SSR dated August 24, 1963 No. 970 with security No. 813 called Collegium. The collegium in Chernigov in 1700 was founded on the basis of the Slavic-Latin and Slavic-mathematical elementary schools of Novgorod-Seversky by the Archbishop of Chernigov and Novgorod-Seversky at the expense of the hetman's office of Ivan Mazepa in accordance with the decree of Tsar Peter the Great on the "establishment of collegiums for the purpose of education. The collegium building was built in the Cossack baroque style.

== History ==
The Collegium was founded in 1700 by Ioan Maksimovich Vasilkovsky, Archbishop of Chernigov and Novgorod-Seversky, and later, Archbishop of Tobolsk. Initially, the Chernihiv Collegium was called the Little Russian Collegium. The Chernigov Collegium included the schools of Lazar Baranovich (Slavic-Latin and Slavic-mathematical), transferred from Novgorod-Seversk to Chernigov in 1689. The Slavic school was originally located in the Borisoglebsky Monastery. The building of the monastery refectory (the central part of the building is the first floor), built in the second half of the 17th century, was assigned to the collegium.

In 1700–1702. a two-tiered bell tower was erected over the western part of the building. The lower tier was intended for bells, the upper one housed the Church of St. John the Theologian. At the same time, construction is underway on the entire eastern part of the building with a second floor built on top of the refectory. It houses a large refectory hall and the Church of All Saints.

In the collegium in grammar classes, languages were studied: Latin, Polish, Church Slavonic, and later, from the 30s of the 18th century, Russian. Initially, four classes were opened in the collegium, in which grammar and syntax were taught in Latin and Polish. Latin courses in rhetoric, poetics and philosophy were taught only after passing grammar classes. The full course of study took six years.

At first there were only two teachers and a prefect, from the 30s there were three teachers. The composition of the students was all-class: Not only the children of the clergy, but also nobles, burghers and Cossacks, as well as at the Kyiv-Mohyla Academy, studied at the collegium. By the mid-1930s, poetics had not yet been singled out in a separate class at the Chernigov Collegium, but was expounded along with rhetoric, logic and dialectics by one teacher, namely the prefect. In the courses of poetics and rhetoric, they studied the theoretical foundations of ancient poetry and eloquence, learned to write poetic works in Latin and Polish, compose and deliver speeches, panegyrics, sermons, etc. Starting from the 40s. In the 18th century speeches in Russian also appear.

According to the academic tradition that existed back in the Kyiv-Mohyla Academy, at the Chernihiv Collegium, each teacher of poetics, rhetoric and philosophy had to prepare his own course of lectures, which he dictated to students. Only a small number of manuscript courses from the Chernihiv Collegium have survived to this day. A detailed description of the courses of the Chernigov Collegium was first carried out by the historian N. I. Petrov.

In 1705, a collection of syllabic verses, Mirror from Divine Scripture, was published at the Collegium.

In 1716, the teachers of the collegium translated the history of Rome by Titus Livius into Church Slavonic.

In 1717, the teacher of the Chernihiv Collegium, Archimandrite of the Trinity-Ilyinsky Monastery German Kononovich, published the New Testament for the first time in Chernigov. In it, he commented on vague passages from the New Testament for the reader.

In 1749, on the initiative of Ambrose Dubnevich, a philosophical class was opened, which, for lack of space, began to be taught in the refectory hall. Philosophy, together with the course of theology that followed it, constituted a higher stage of the sciences superiora than the course of rhetoric, which preceded philosophy. Philosophy studied for two years. Since the second half of the 18th century, courses in German, Greek and French, arithmetic, geometry and planimetry appeared in the collegium.

In 1784–1786. The Chernihiv Collegium was reorganized into the Chernihiv Theological Seminary. She organized a museum of church antiquities and a church-archaeological commission. The teachers of the seminary were engaged in scientific work, published in the "Chernigov Diocesan News" and the journal "Faith and Life".

At the end of the 18th century, the reconstruction of the building began in connection with the placement of offices in it.

In the 19th century, during the restructuring, the entire facade decor of the building was destroyed, the walls were smoothly plastered.

In 1891, a vestibule with a porch in the Russian style was added on the western side. This was followed by restructuring to adapt the building for housing.

In 1951–1953 the monument has been restored.

In 1970–1980 the building was being refurbished.

Currently, the Chernihiv Collegium is part of the National Architectural and Historical Reserve "Ancient Chernihiv".

=== List of prefects of hieromonks ===
Here below the List of prefects of hieromonks of the Chernihiv Collegium:

- Anthony Stakhovsky (1700-1709)
- John Dubinsky (1721, 1724–1725)
- Justin Boguslavsky (1722)
- Faddey Kokuylovich (1722, 1723–1724)
- Dmitry Smyalovsky (1726-1727)
- Varlaam Demchinsky (1727-1728)
- Ephraim Boldinsky (1727, 1729–1730)
- Meletiy Zhurakovsky (1730-1731)
- Tovia Smorzhevsky (1732-1734)
- Josaf Lipiatsky (1735-1737)
- Sophrony Ziminsky (1737-1739)
- Pankraty Chernisky (1739-1742)
- Simon Boretsky (1742-1744)
- Iona Narozhnitsky (1744-1748)
- Sylvester Nowopolsky (1749-1752)
- Gabriel Oginsky (1753-1756)
- Jeremiah Gusarevsky (1756-1758)
- Petroniy Gankevich (1759-1761)
- Patricy Kotelnetsky (1761-1768)
- Callist Zvenigorodsky (1769-1776)
- Iona Levitsky (1776-1778)
- Pallady Lukashevich (1778-1782)
- David (1783-1786)

== Architectural appearance ==
The building is an elongated rectangle in plan, oriented from west to east. Above the western part of the building is a bell tower. The length of the building with attached vestibule and porch is 48 m. The height of the bell tower is 40 m. The masonry is made of grooved bricks, the foundation and plinth masonry is made of huge boulders. The ceilings of the original building are vaulted and flat. The ceilings of the Church of St. John the Evangelist are a closed vault with ledges decorated with rods with beads, on the vault there is a stucco ornament. Overlapping of the rest of the rooms with closed and semicircular vaults with formwork. In the Church of All Saints, the domes have been lost, but the supporting part of the large drum and the sail in the apse have been preserved. The facade is richly decorated with pilasters, three-quarter columns, niches, curbs, tile inserts, and a columnar arched belt. The windows are framed with platbands, columns and kokoshniks of various shapes. The frieze of the bell tower has stucco rosettes and ceramic plot reliefs. The architecture and decor of the collegium is a vivid example of Ukrainian baroque, a monument of national importance.

== Gallery ==
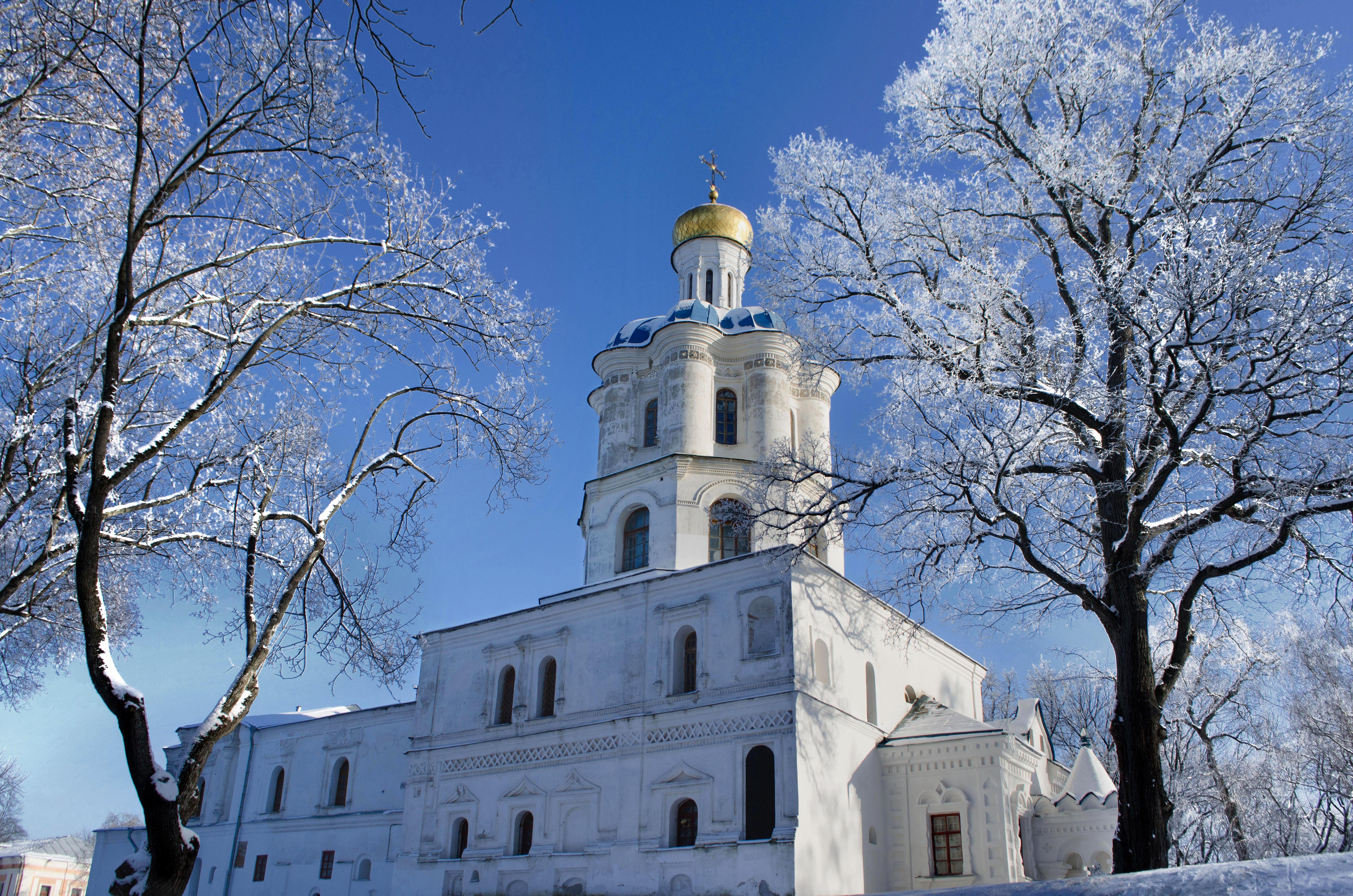

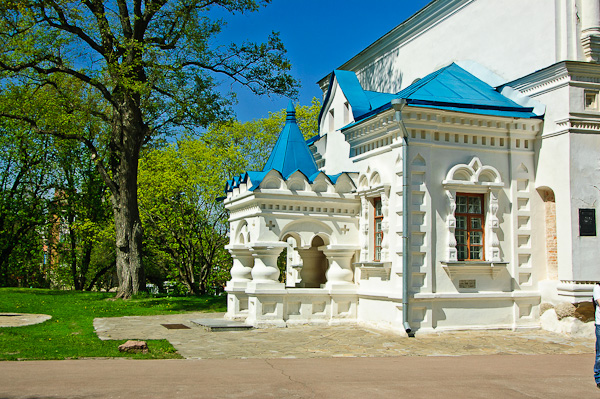

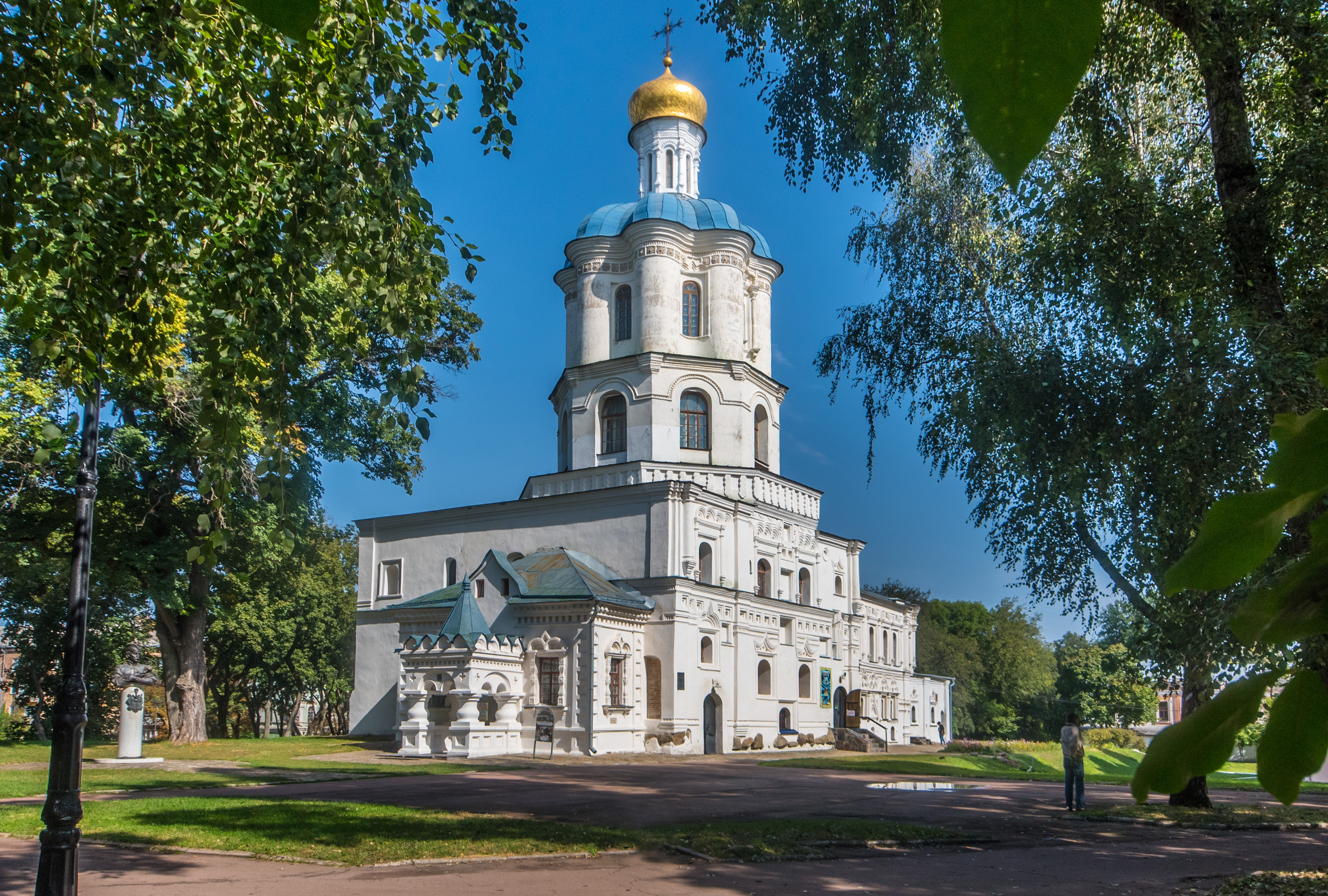

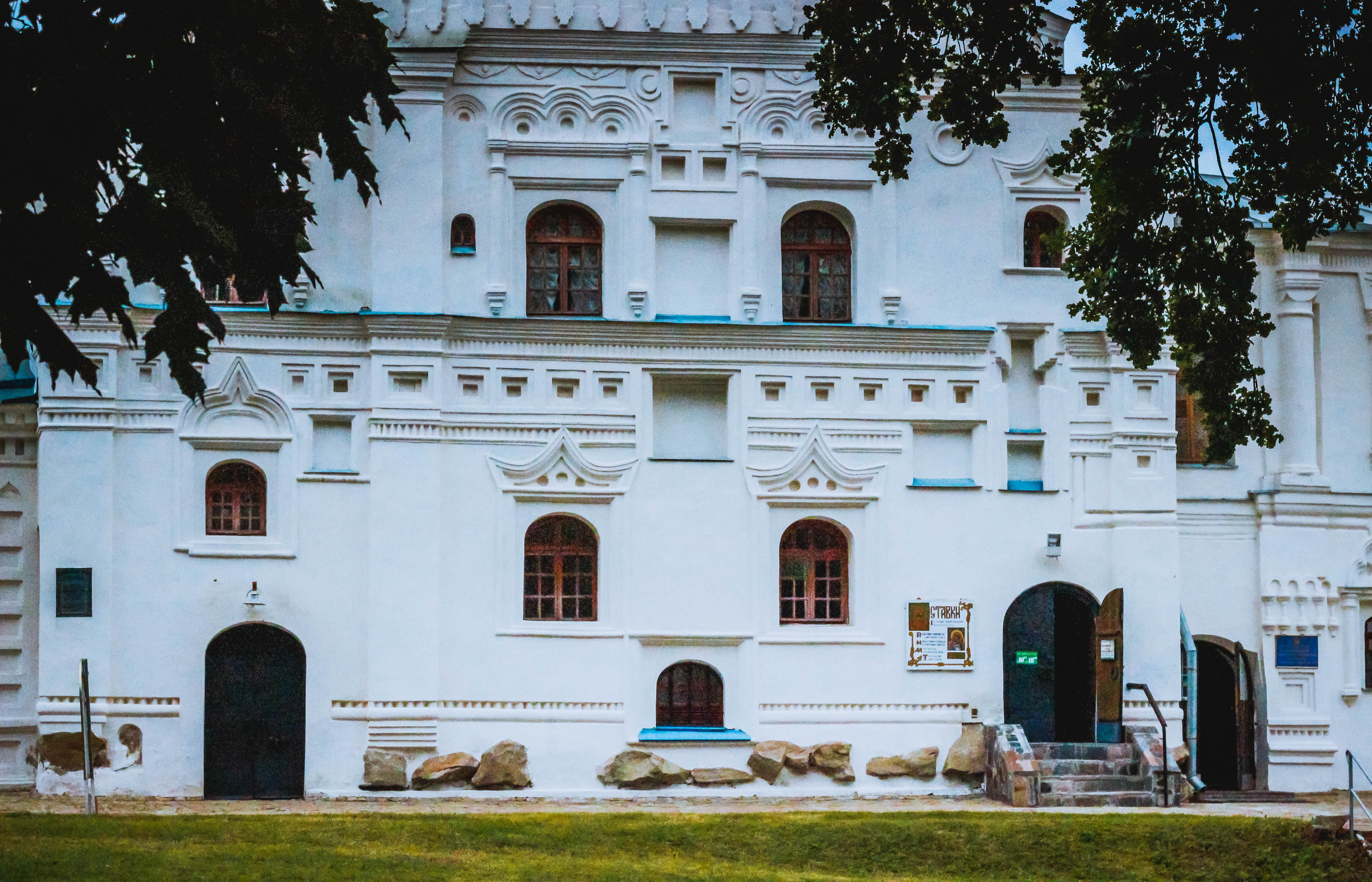

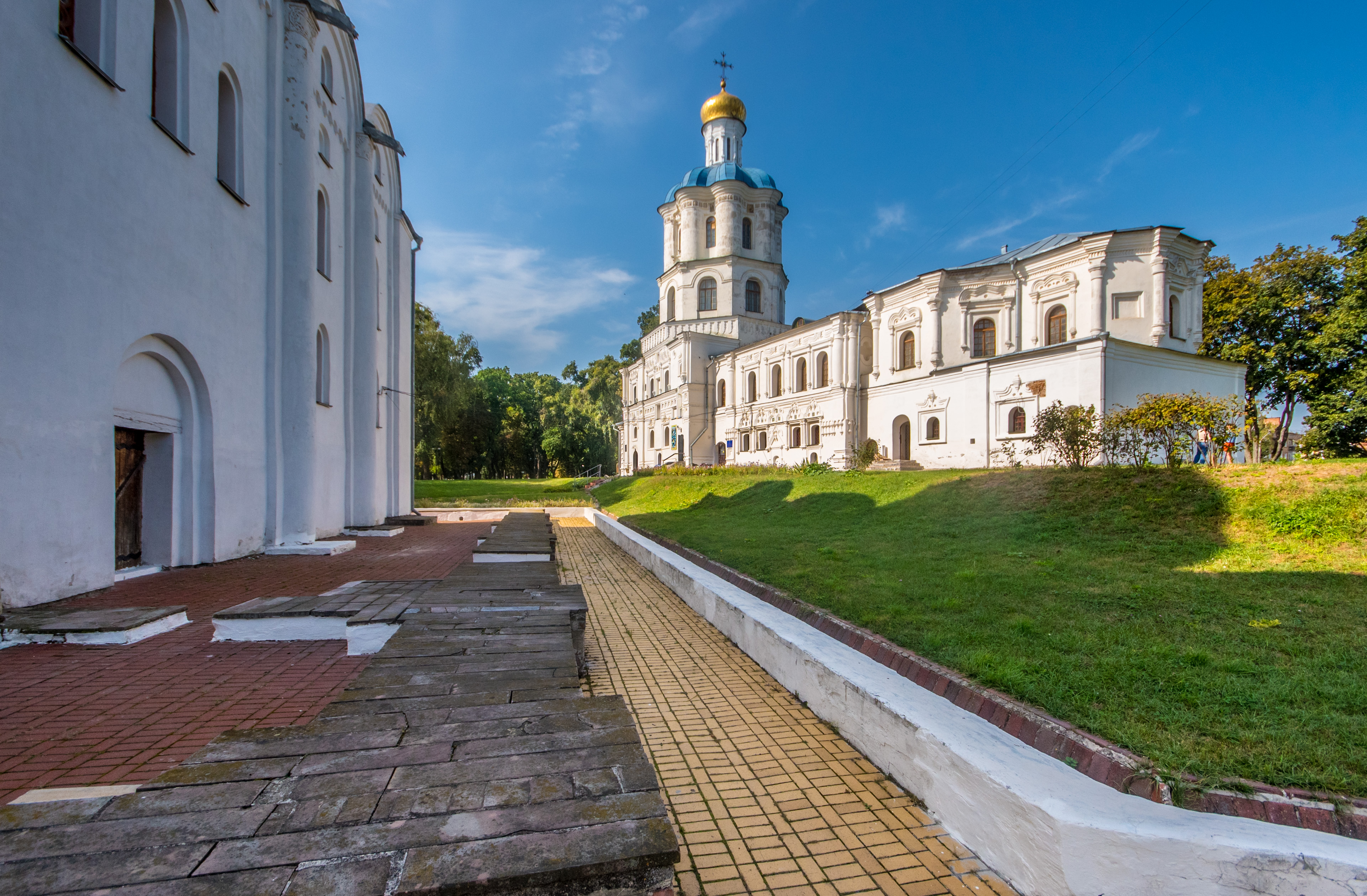

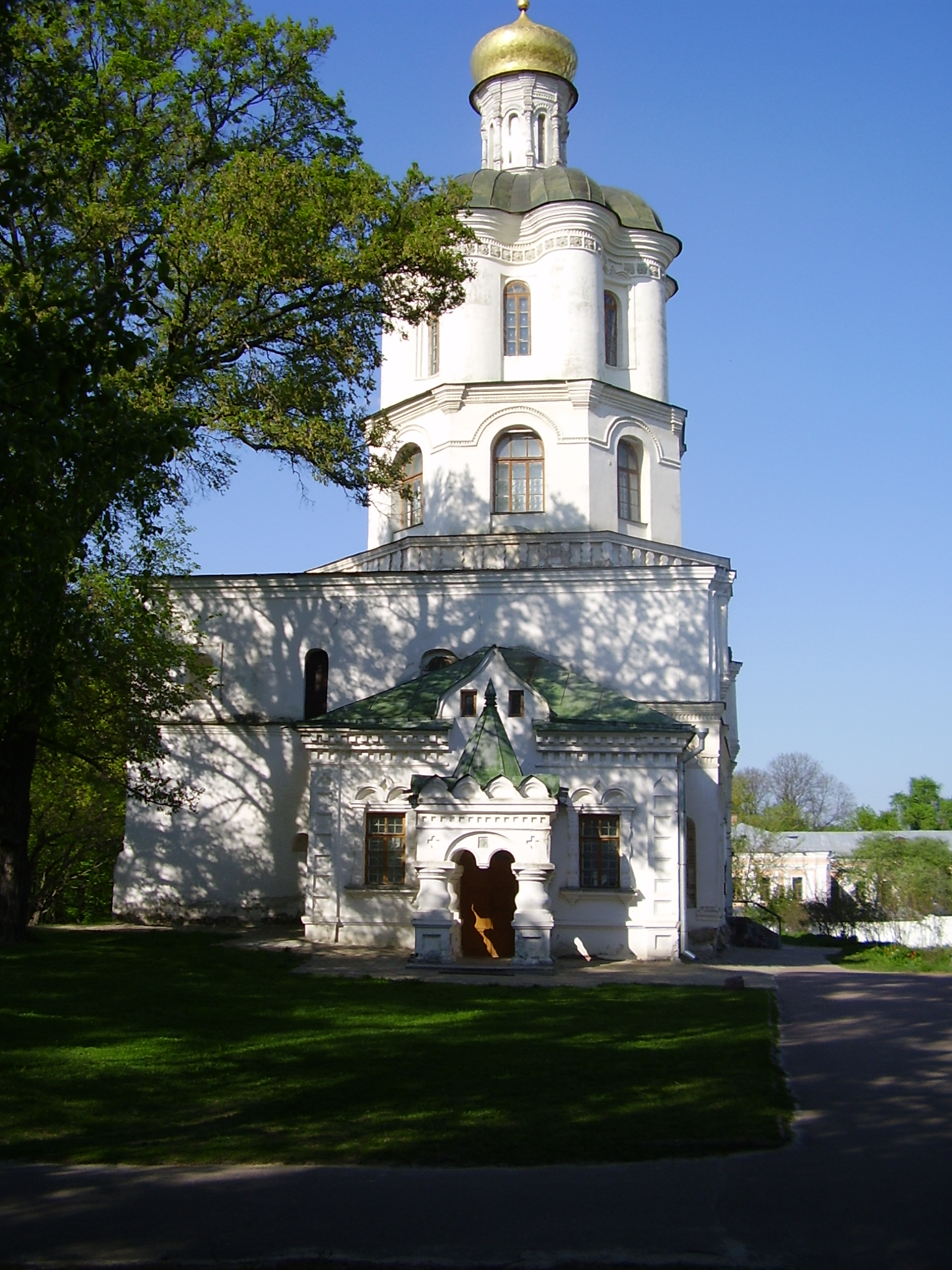

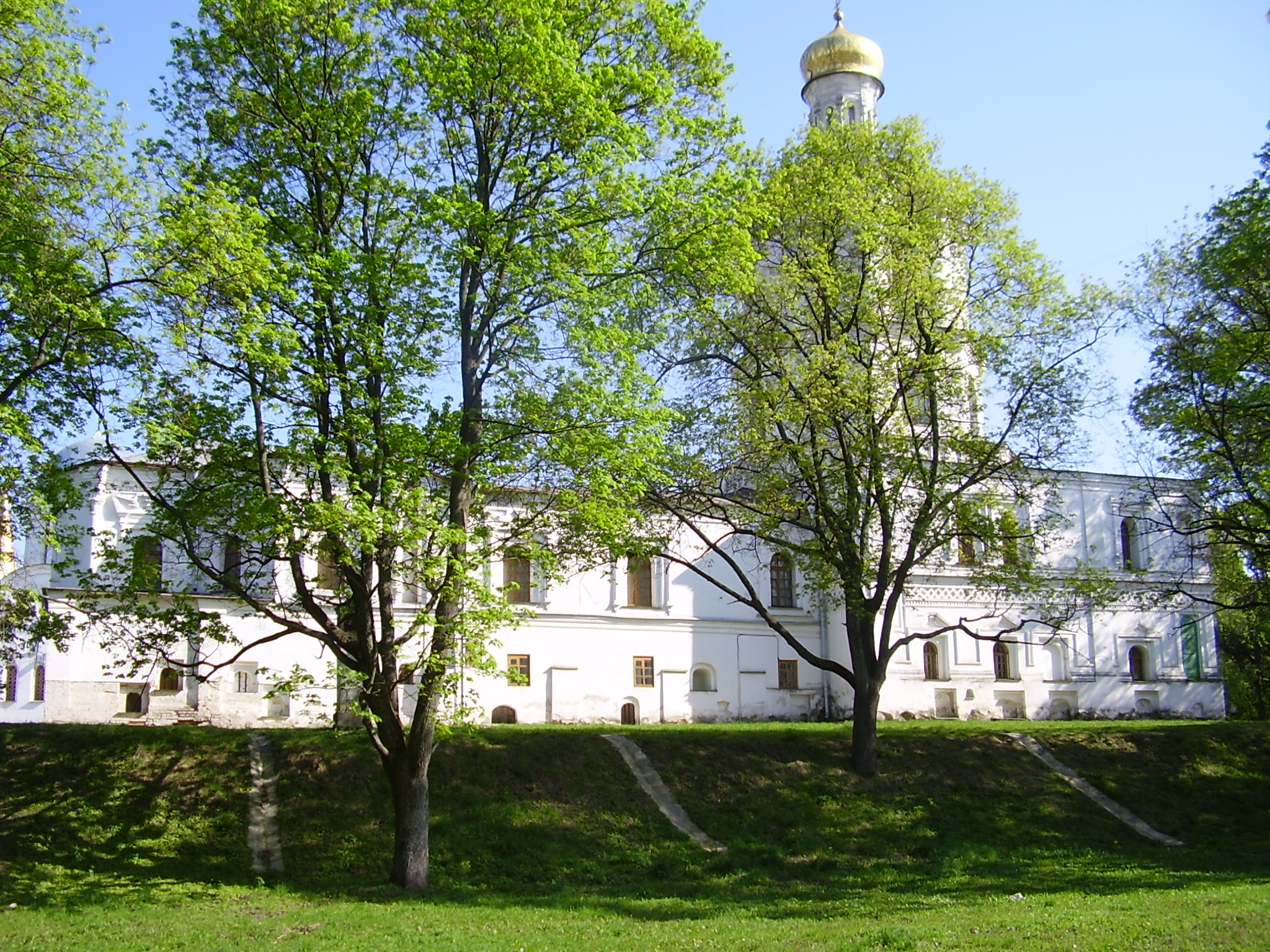

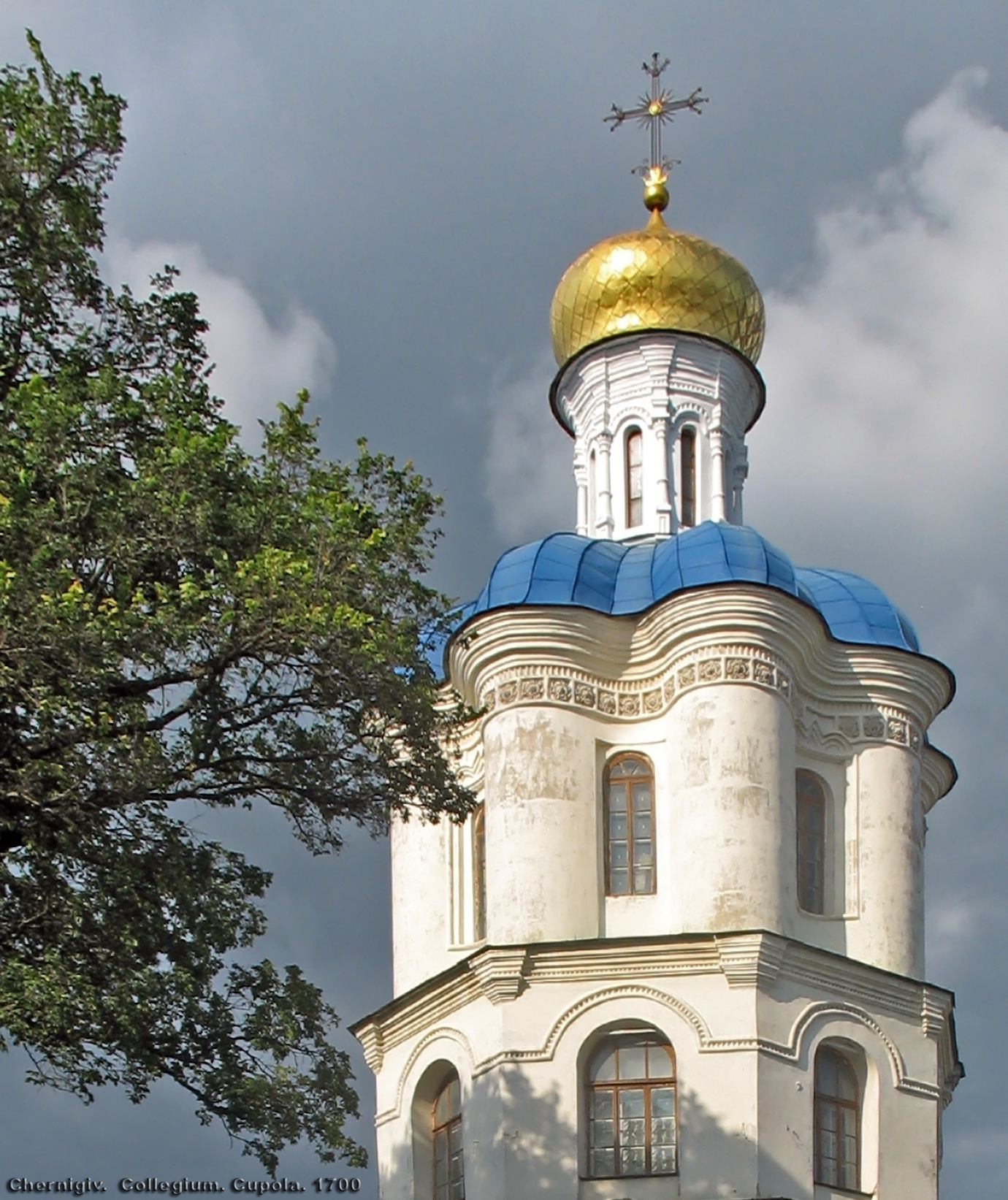

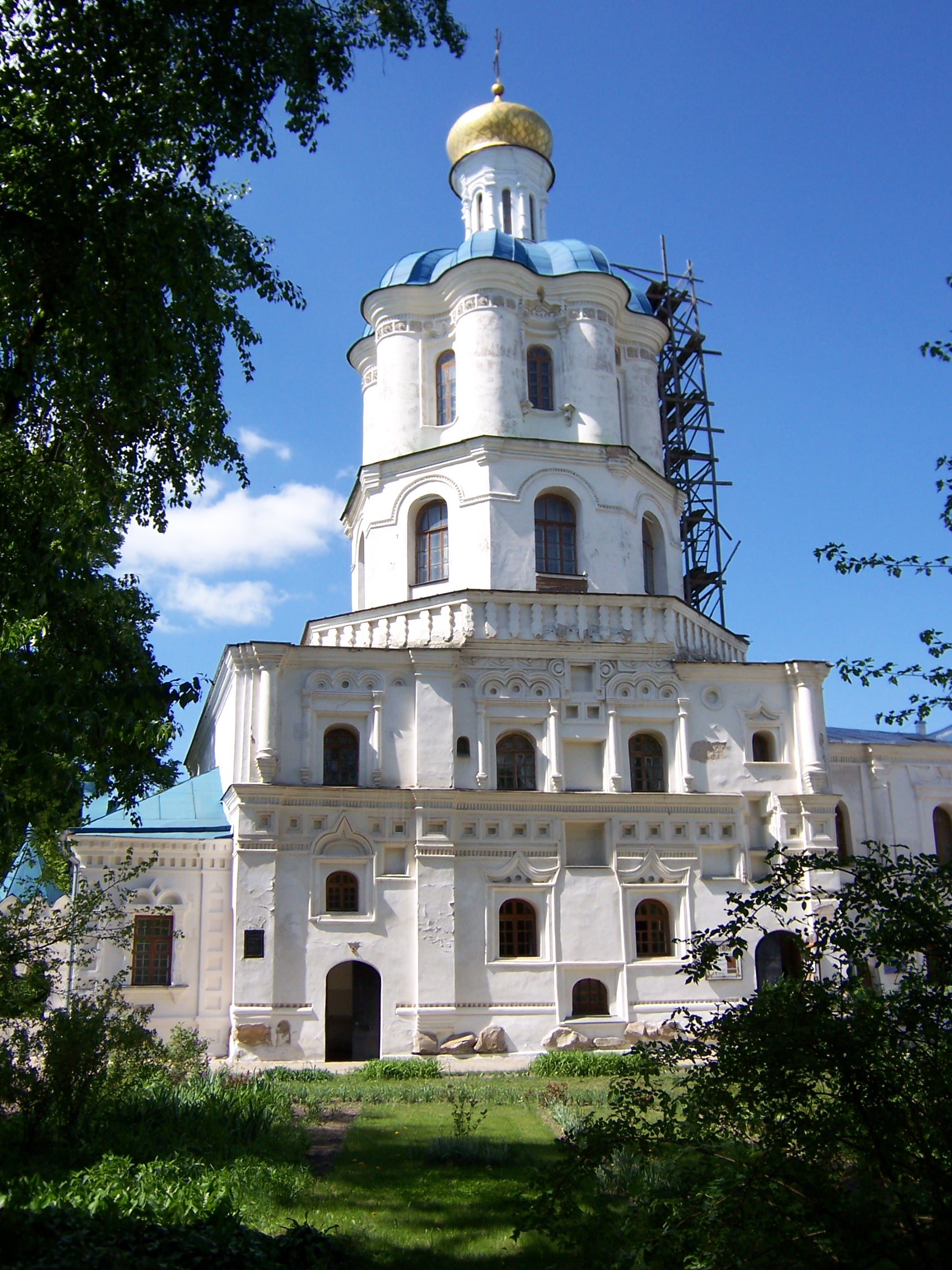

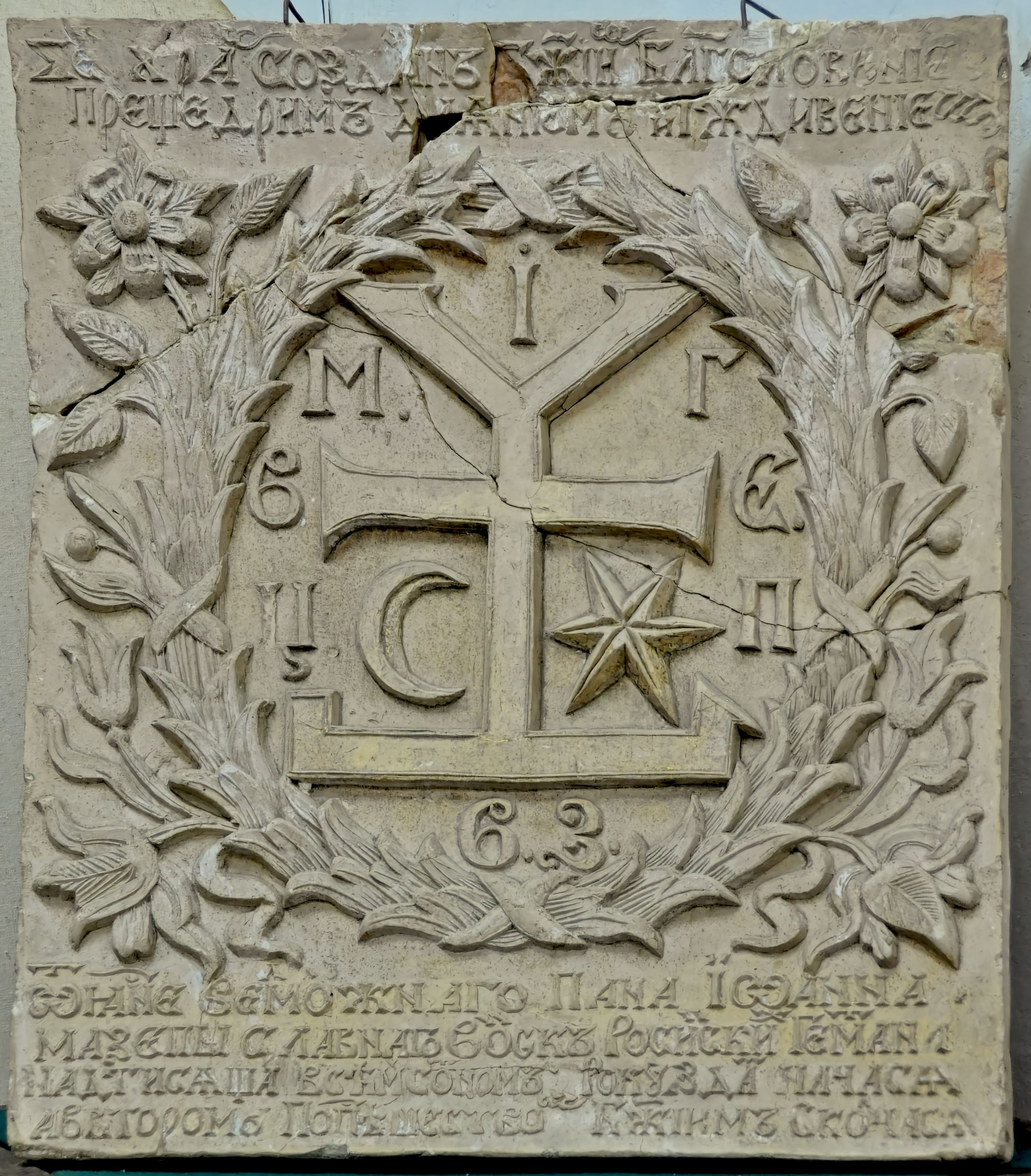
