= List of parks and gardens in Chernihiv =

There are a number of parks and gardens in the city of Chernihiv, Ukraine.

== Parks in Chernihiv ==
- Dytynets Park
- Park Miskyi Sad
- Marin Hai Park
- Yalivshchyna Regional Landscape Park
- Bohdan Khmelnytskyi Garden
