= Chernihiv Regional Art Museum =

Museum in Ukraine

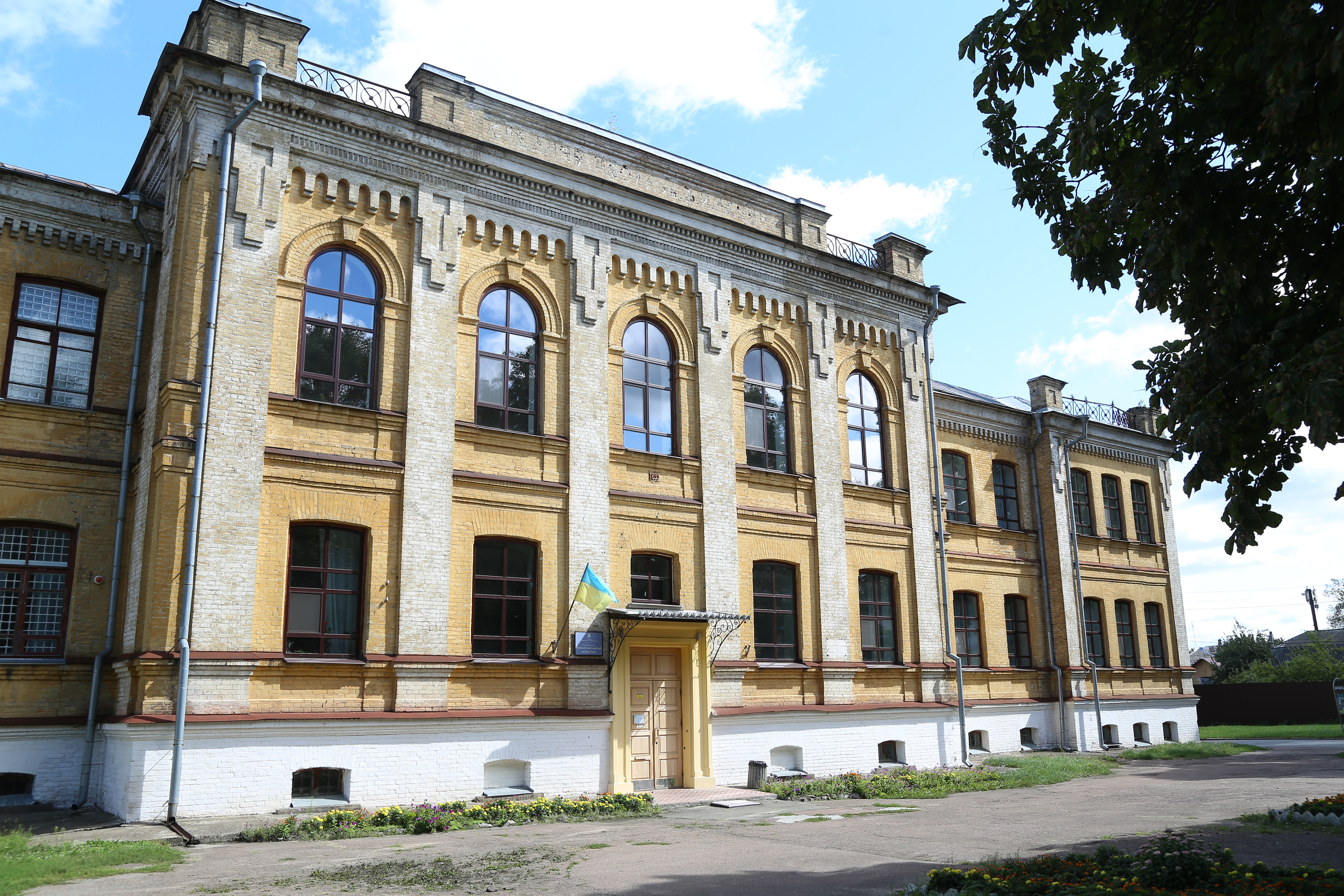

Religion
- Affiliation: Orthodox

Location
- Location: 14006, Ukraine, Chernihiv, (Val territory).
- Interactive map of Chernihiv Regional Art Museum
- Coordinates: 51.4901°N 31.3098°E

Website
- Official website

The Chernihiv Regional Art Museum (Ukrainian: Чернігівський обласний художній музей імені Григорія Галагана, romanized: Chernihivskyi oblasnyi khudozhnii muzei imeni Hryhoriia Halahana) is located in the street Muzeyna, 6 (Val territory), Chernihiv, Ukraine. The museum's building was partially damaged in 2022 during the Russian invasion of Ukraine.

== Overview ==
Chernihiv Regional Art Museum, located in Dytynets Park, on the territory of the ancient princely city in the architectural monument of the 19th century, even outwardly corresponds to the idea of the museum as a place that bears the imprint of time, a reflection of the history and culture of our people. You will be inspired by masterpieces of Western European and Ukrainian art, a unique collection of the Galagan Cossack family from the museum collection, which includes more than 16,000 works of fine and decorative arts from the 16th century to the present, including the iconographic heritage of the Ukrainian Baroque. "Mamai", paintings by Dutch, Flemish, French and Italian artists. A prominent place in the museum collection is occupied by works of icon painting, mostly Ukrainian, including the canonical "Archangel Michael", a collection of icons of the Virgin, an original folk icon with a peculiar interpretation of one or another image of the patron saint, the two-sided "Protection of the Mother of God. Crucifix". The collection of Western European paintings, in particular the works of Italian artists of the 17th-18th centuries, is interesting. Dutch and Flemish painting acquaints with works of the battle and domestic genres, various still lifes, paintings on mythological and evangelical subjects. The decoration of the collection, of course, is the painting "Concert" by the famous Dutch artist H. Terbruggen, dated 1626.

== Works ==
The museum has many Ukrainian icons and a collection of Ukrainian portraits which illustrates the development of this genre over two centuries – from the end of the 17th century to the beginning of the 20th century.

It also holds a small collection of Italian, Dutch, Flemish and German works, including The Concert by Hendrick ter Brugghen and a painting by Philipp Hieronymus Brinckmann.

French artists of the 18th and 19th centuries include Hubert Robert (Ruines d'un vieux château), François Marius Granet (Chœur des Capucins de la place Barberini à Rome), Ernest Meissonnier (Amoureux des tableaux), Jean-Baptiste Greuze (Portrait d'une jeune fille en coiffe blanche) as well as sculptures like Félix Lecomte (Marie-Antoinette), Gustave Doré (Vierge à l'Enfant), François Pompon (Cosette) and works by Pierre-Jules Mêne.

Ukrainian and Russian artists include Apollon Mokritsky (Portrait of Eugene Grebenka), Alexey Voloskov (Gothic bridge in Sokirin park), Nikolai Ge (Portrait of a girl with a red sash), Lev Lagorio (Ruins of Razumovski Palace (Baturyn), Razumovskiy palace in Baturyn), Mikhail Clodt von Jürgensburg (Autumn Plowing in Ukraine), Mark Antokolsky (Méphistophélès), Fyodor Buchholz (Biting into it), Sergueï Svetoslavski (A fisherman's net), Nikolay Samokish (The Red army crossing the Syvash).

== Gallery ==
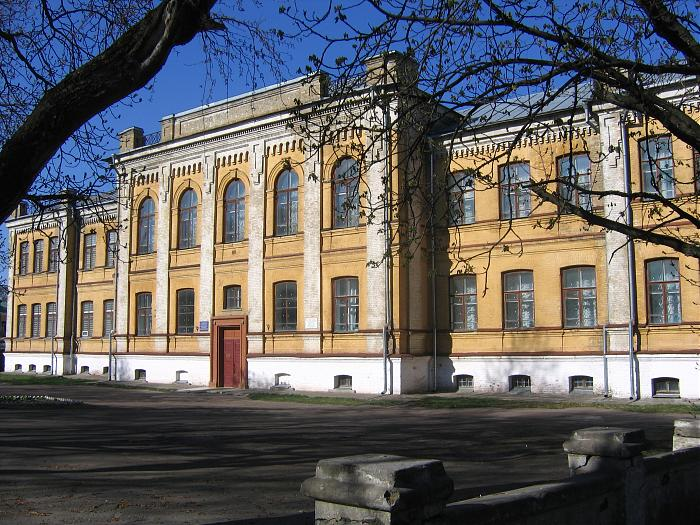
Side View

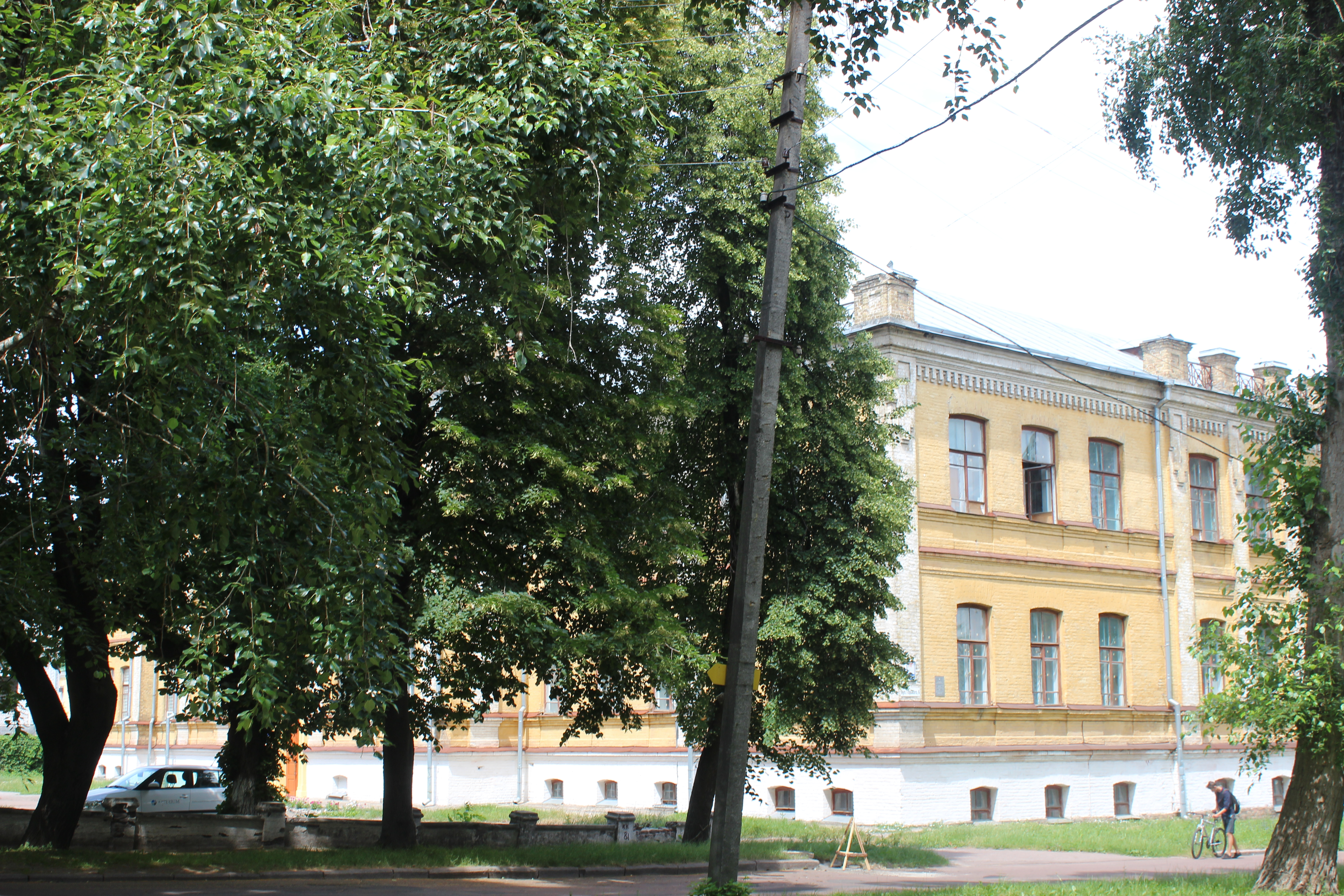
View from Dytynets Park

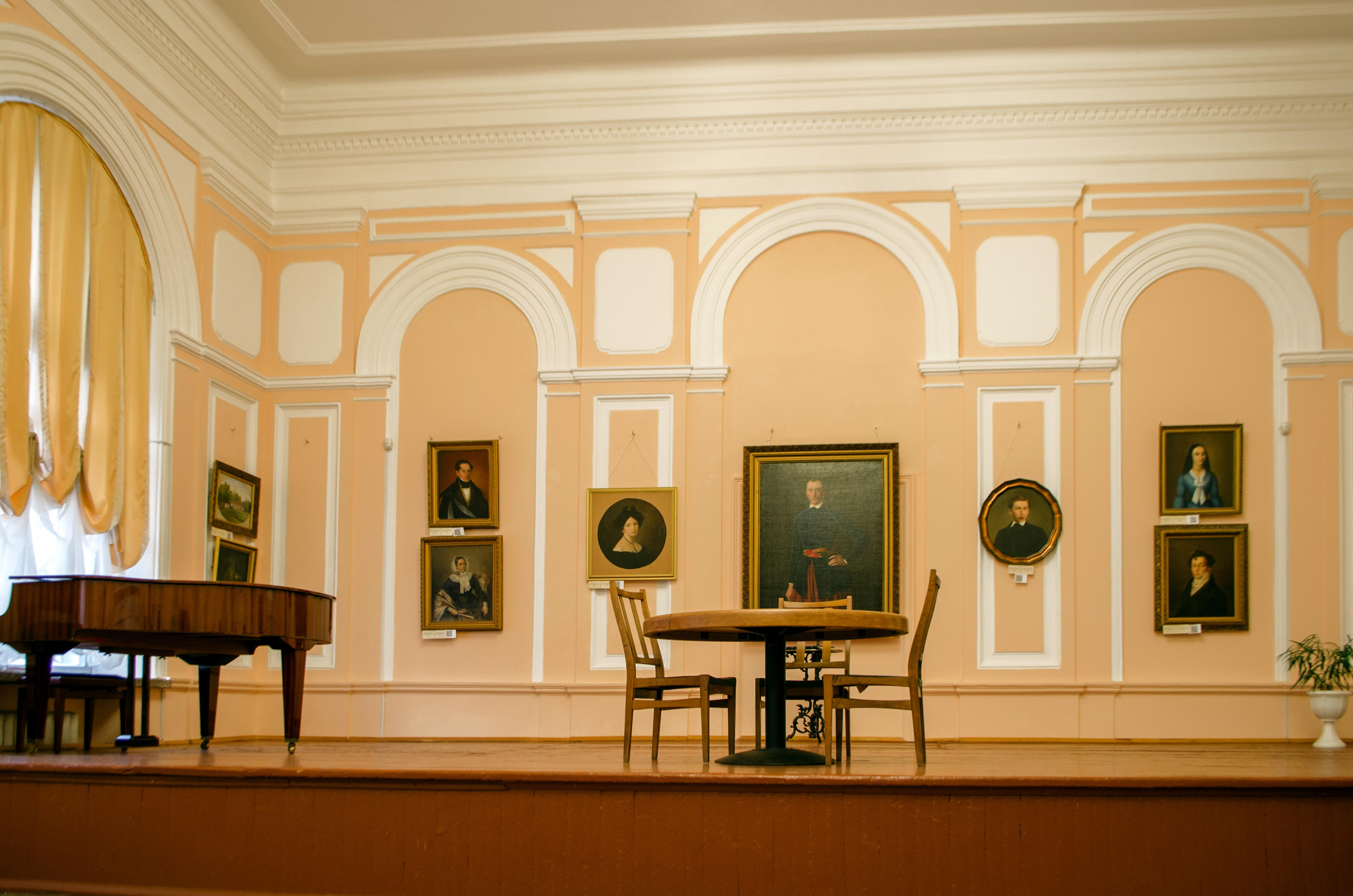
Exhibition hall

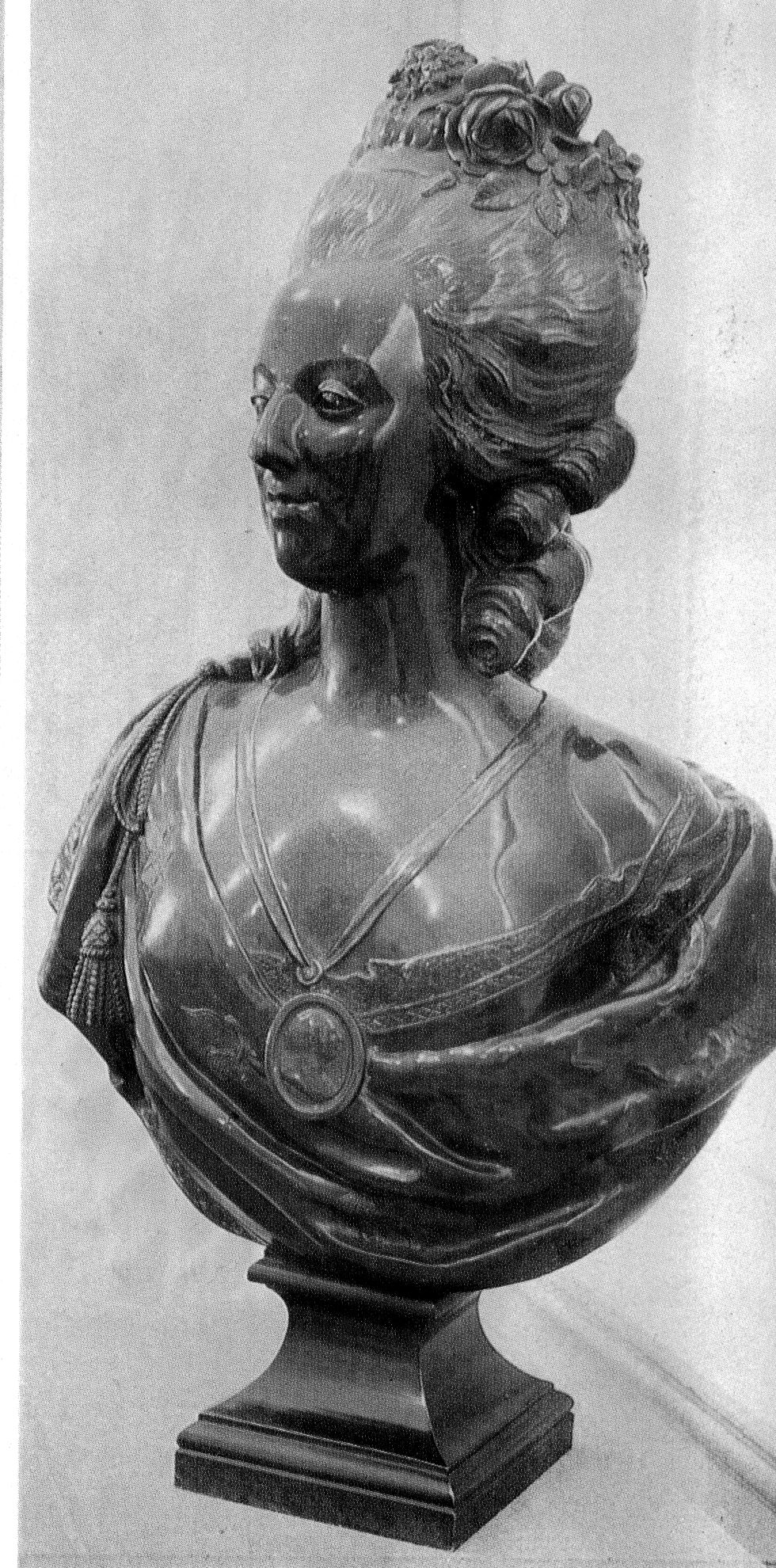
Bust depicting Marie Antoinette

== See also ==
- List of museums in Chernihiv
- List of museums in Ukraine
