= Transfiguration Cathedral, Chernihiv =

Church in Chernihiv, Ukraine

Transfiguration Cathedral
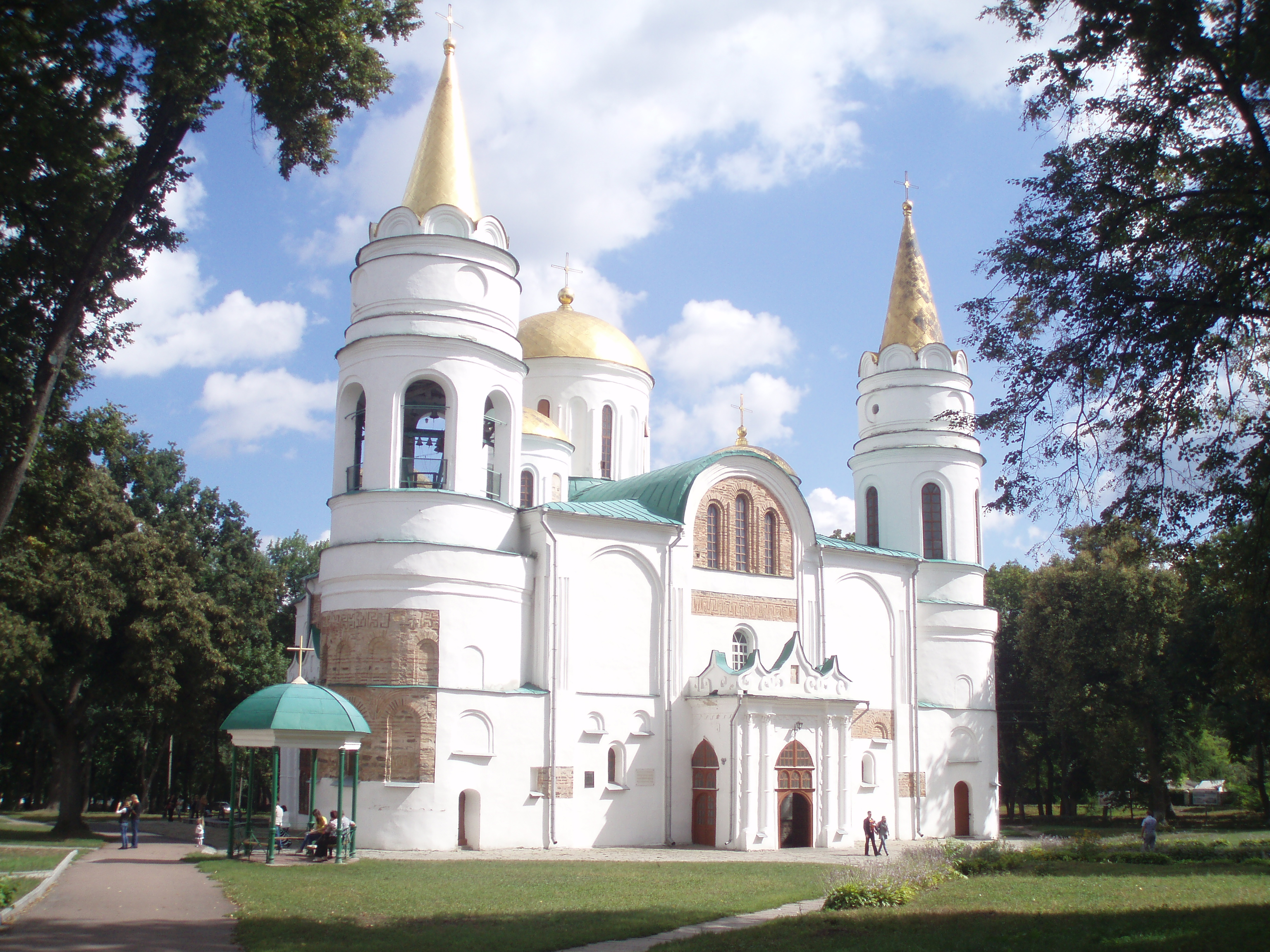
- The main facade
- Transfiguration Cathedral
- 51°29′21″N 31°18′27″E
- Location: Dytynets Park, Chernihiv
- Country: Ukraine

History
- Status: Museum

Architecture
- Architectural type: Cathedral
- Style: Byzantine
- Completed: 11th century

Immovable Monument of National Significance of Ukraine
- Official name: Спасо-Преображенський собор (Saviour-Transfiguration Cathedral)
- Type: Architecture
- Reference no.: 250051

The Transfiguration Cathedral or Saviour-Transfiguration Cathedral (Ukrainian: Спасо-Преображенський собор) is the oldest building in Chernihiv, Ukraine, and one of the few surviving buildings of pre-Mongol Rus. It is located in Dytynets Park.

== History ==
Construction of the cathedral was started by Prince Mstislav of Chernigov, and legend states that when Mstislav died in 1035 or 1036, the height of the walls were equal to the height of a horseman. It is unclear when the construction was completed. Mstislav was buried in the cathedral. The Transfiguration Cathedral was damaged in 1239, during the Mongol invasion, renovated in the mid-17th century, burned down in the 18th century and was again renovated later. The current exterior stems from the end of the 19th century.

The architecture is unusual as it combines elements of a Roman basilica with a typical Byzantine church. It has three naves with three apses and five domes. There are two towers at the two sides of the main facade.

The cathedral has been on the UNESCO World Heritage Site tentative list since 1989.

== See also ==
- List of Churches and Monasteries in Chernihiv
- Ancient Chernihiv
