= Catherine's Church, Chernihiv =

St. Catherine's Church
- Свято-Катерининська церква
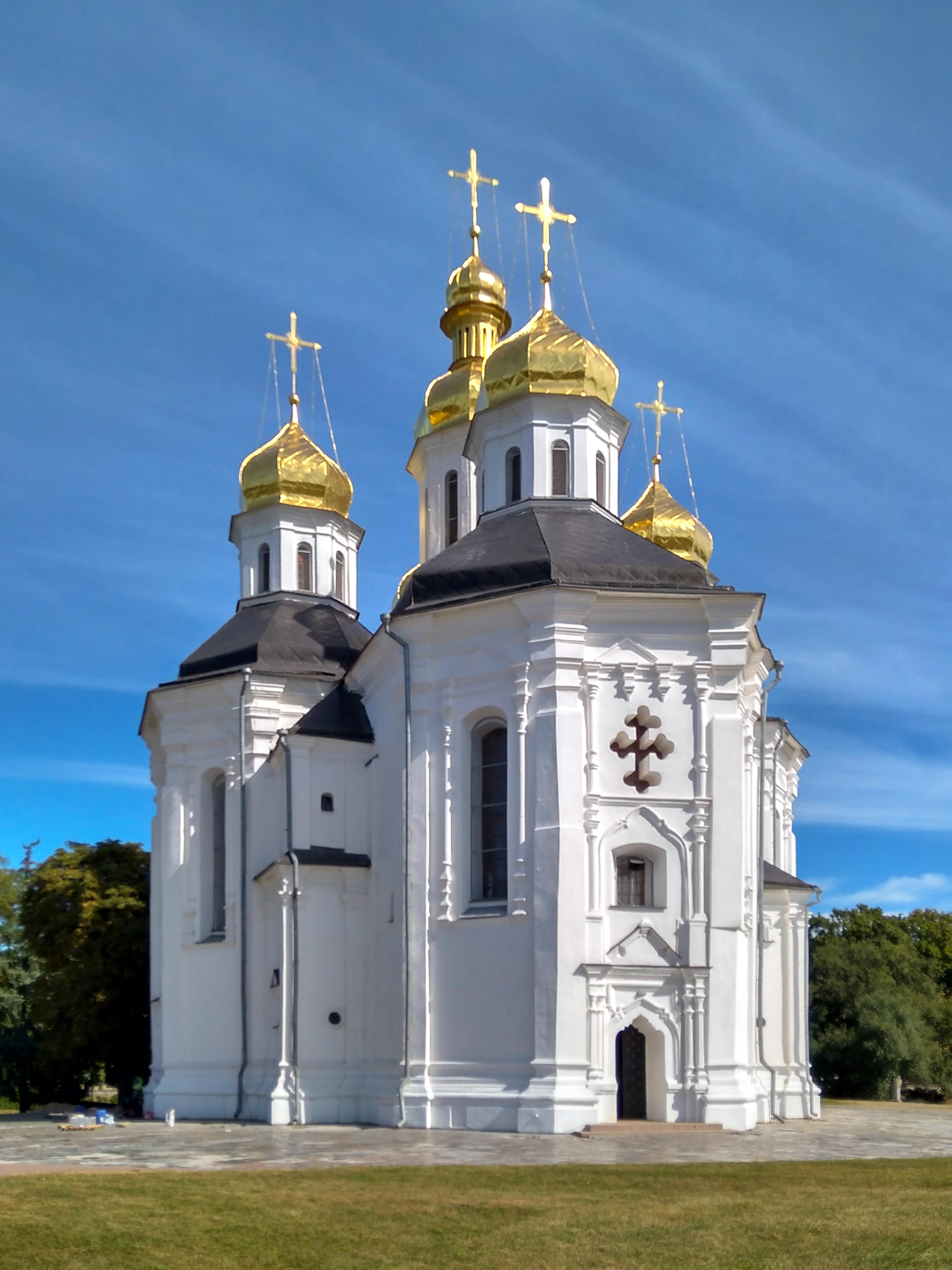

Religion
- Affiliation: Eastern Orthodox Church
- District: Orthodox Church of Ukraine

Location
- Location: Chernihiv, Ukraine
- Interactive map of St. Catherine's Church
- Coordinates: 51°29′13″N 31°18′19″E

Architecture
- Type: Church
- Style: Ukrainian Baroque
- Completed: 1715

Immovable Monument of National Significance of Ukraine
- Official name: Катерининська церква (St. Catherine's Church)
- Type: Architecture
- Reference no.: 250048

The Catherine's Church (Ukrainian: Катерининська церква, romanized: Katerynynska tserkva), or Cossacks' Holy Great Martyr St. Catherine's Cathedral (Ukrainian: Козацький Кафедральний собор Святої Великомучениці Катерини, romanized: Kozatskyi Kafedralnyi sobor Sviatoi Velykomuchenytsi Kateryny) is a functioning church in Chernihiv, Ukraine.

St. Catherine's Church was built in the Cossack period and is distinguished by its five gold domes in the Ukrainian Baroque style. It can be found at the entrance to Chernihiv and is included as part of the historical reserve of "Ancient Chernihiv". It is one of the main architectural landmarks of the city. The church was erected in honor of the Chernihiv regiment of Cossacks who had shown heroism and bravery during the storming of the Ottoman fortress of Azov.

== History ==
St. Catherine's Church was built in honor of the heroism of the Chernihiv regiment of Cossacks who took part in the assault on the Ottoman fortress of Azov in 1696 under the command of Chernihiv colonel Yakiv Lyzohub. The church was dedicated in 1715 in honor of St. Catherine, who had been respected in Ukraine for a long time. St. Catherine's Church has not been subject to great changes over time. In 1837 the narthex was added to the western façade of the church and the bell tower was erected in 1908. Both were taken apart during the church's restoration. The church suffered damage in World War II from 1941-1943, when the roofs and the tops of domes were burned. The restoration works were carried out in two phases: 1947-1955 and 1975-1980.

St. Catherine's Church is the greatest monument of the Ukrainian (Cossack) renaissance of the 17th-18th centuries which has remained in an authentic state. It produced a decisive influence on the development of Ukrainian church architecture of the 18th century and still plays the role of city building in the historical party of the city. In spring 1990 a group of Chernihiv Cossacks renewed their activity that had been suppressed by the Soviet authorities in 1933. In 1992 the Cossack Orthodox community of St. Catherine's Church was officially registered by the State and in 1994 it was recognized as "a successor of the appropriate right and duties" of the previous community. On April 2, 1995 the Cossacks Orthodox community was taken under the protection of the patriarch of Kyiv and all Rus–Ukraine Volodymyr (Romaniuk).

On April 5, 2006, the church building was transferred to the possession of St. Catherine's Church Cossacks Orthodox community.

On May 22, 2008, according to the decision of the Supreme Court of Appeal of Ukraine, the legality of transferring St. Catherine's Church to the believers of the Ukrainian Orthodox Church of Kyiv Patriarchy was confirmed.

On July 19, 2008, the Cossacks Orthodox Community with the chairman of the parish council and the Bishop of Chernihiv and Nizhin entered the Church and renewed public worship after 75 years of prohibition. From then on, Church has become the Cossacks Cathedral of Chernihiv eparchy.

The canonization of the Reverend Mercury, Father Superior Bragynski took place in St. Catherine's Cathedral on December 7, 2011. The ceremony was headed by the Patriarch of Kyiv and all Rus-Ukraine Filaret. The relic shrine of a saint's body has become one of the church's sacred objects. The church parishioners actively supported the Euromaidan in 2013, the Revolution of Dignity in 2014 and the volunteer movement helping to regenerate the Ukrainian Army. The names of more than one hundred donors who had rendered material and financial assistance and participated in person were entered in the church's synodic list. With the direct participation of the archpriest Eugen (Orda) and the Chairman of the parish council help was rendered to the Kyiv Maidan.

Members of the Cossacks Paris have taken part in the War in Donbas. On June 26, 2014 in the ATO zone not far from the town of Lugansk, Mykola Bruy. a Cathedral parishioner, was killed in fighting, and his burial service took place in the Cossacks Cathedral. By decision of the parish council, the name of Mykola Bruy was entered in the synodic list permanently. On May 15, 2015 by decree of the President of Ukraine, Bruy was decorated with the third degree Order "for the personal courage and great professional skill displayed in defending the nation's sovereignty, territorial integrity and allegiance to oath".

In accordance with Ukrainian tradition and ancient Cossack custom, a synodic list of 134 names of "heroes of the Chernihiv region" have been entered in the church, including 24 from Chernihiv who died fighting for Ukraine.

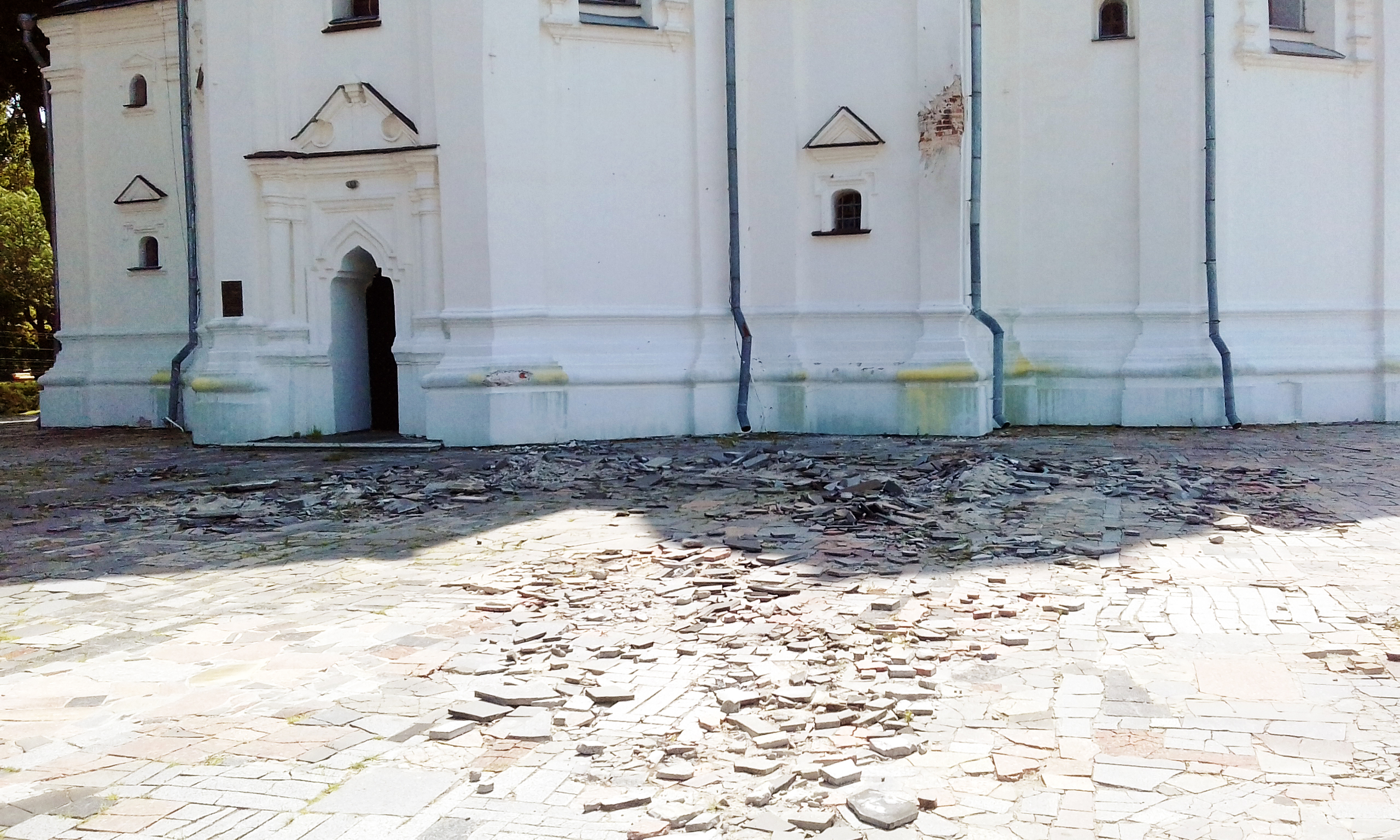
After the rocket attack

Damaged in a rocket attack in 2022 during the Siege of Chernihiv.

== Architecture ==
The church is made of bricks, and is shaped like a cross, with five domes. The composition is centrical, pyramidally built with the highest central dome and lower ones placed over the faceted sleeves of an architectural cross. Its composition is reminiscent of a wooden Ukrainian church with five octahedral capacities – octahedrons each crowned with a dome. Thanks to its pyramidal construction the church looks tender, elegant and solemn. The facades are a characteristic feature of the church. The main role in their decoration is played by portal and windows margins: triangular pediments, frames, and shallow-cut cornices. Modelled ornamentation is not used in the church. Brick, which had replaced plinth by the time of construction, is used both as building and ornamental material. The facades are plastered and limed. The characteristic feature of the interior is its opening upwards. It is a five-chamber pillarless church crowned by five domes. The top is designed in traditional Ukrainian style, with fractures. The walls are white-washed, while the domes and crosses are gilded.

== Conflicts around Church ==
Apart from the Kyiv patriarchy, the Russian Orthodox Church in Ukraine had a claim on the Cossacks St. Catherine's Church. After the church was transferred to the community of the Kyiv Patriarchy, representatives of the Russian Orthodox Church in Ukraine set up "camp church" in the shape of a tarpaulin marquee at the walls of the building. After the Revolution of Dignity the marquee was dismantled on February 21, 2014 by the believers of the Russian Orthodox Church in Ukraine under pressure of the Chernihiv community.

== Gallery ==
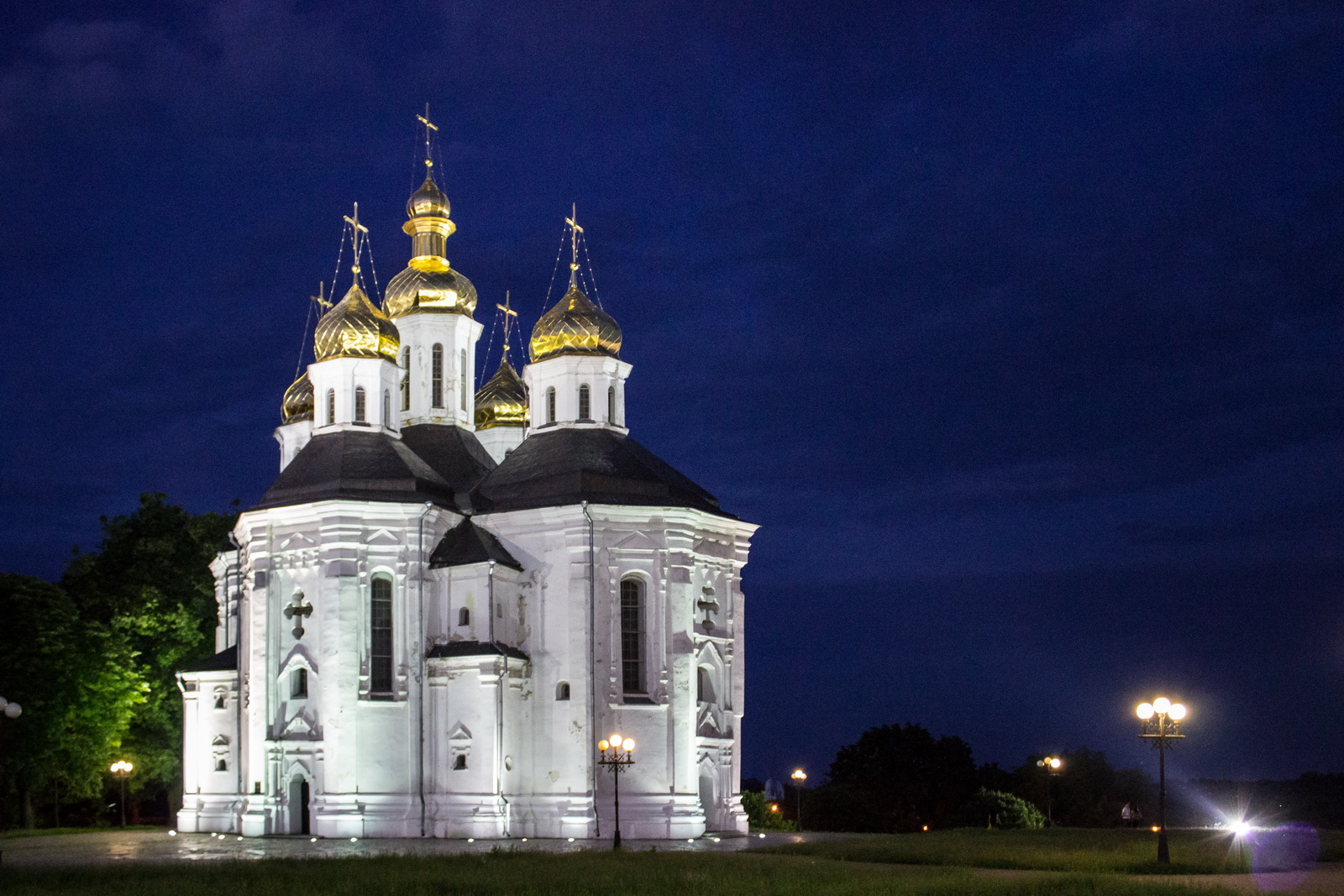

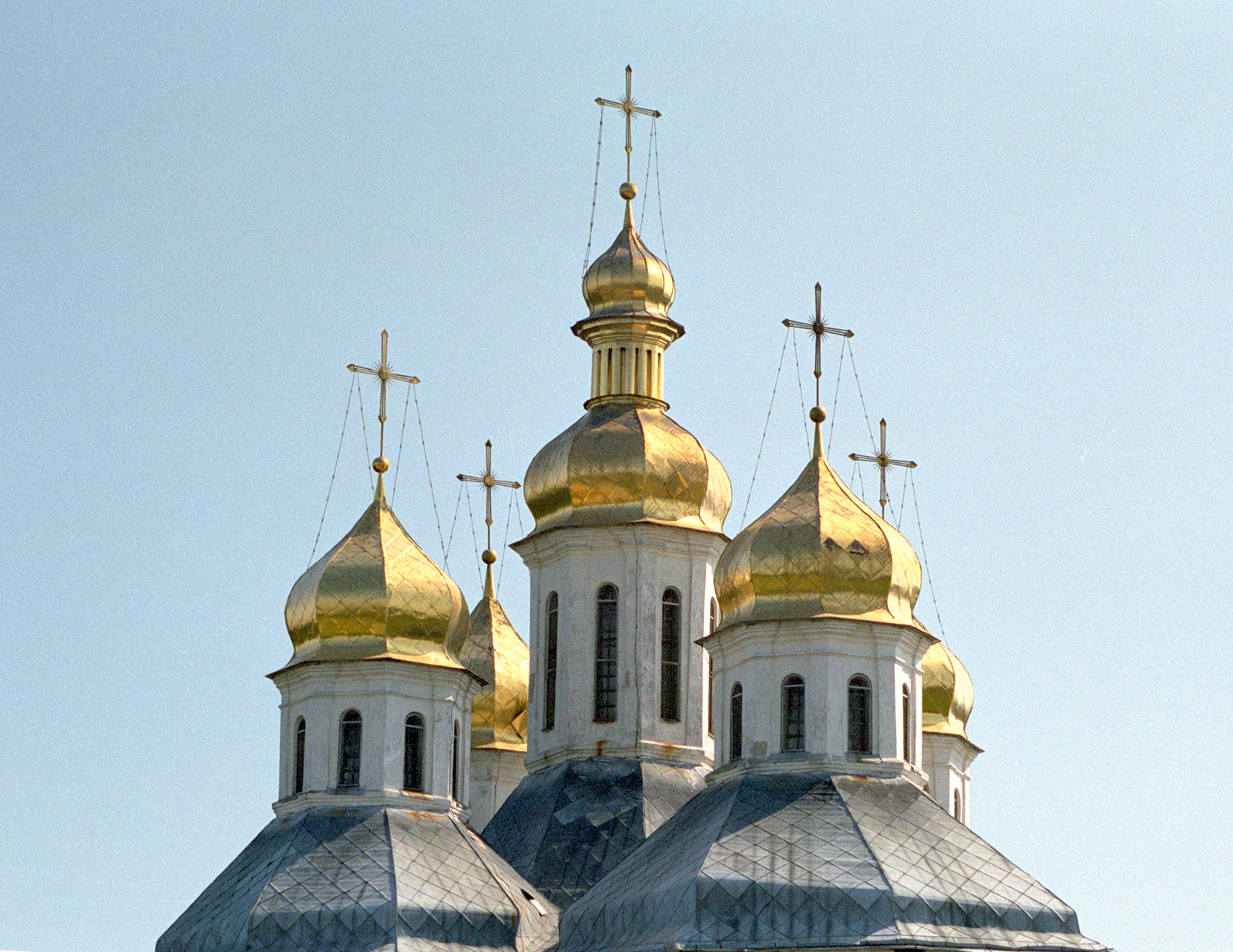

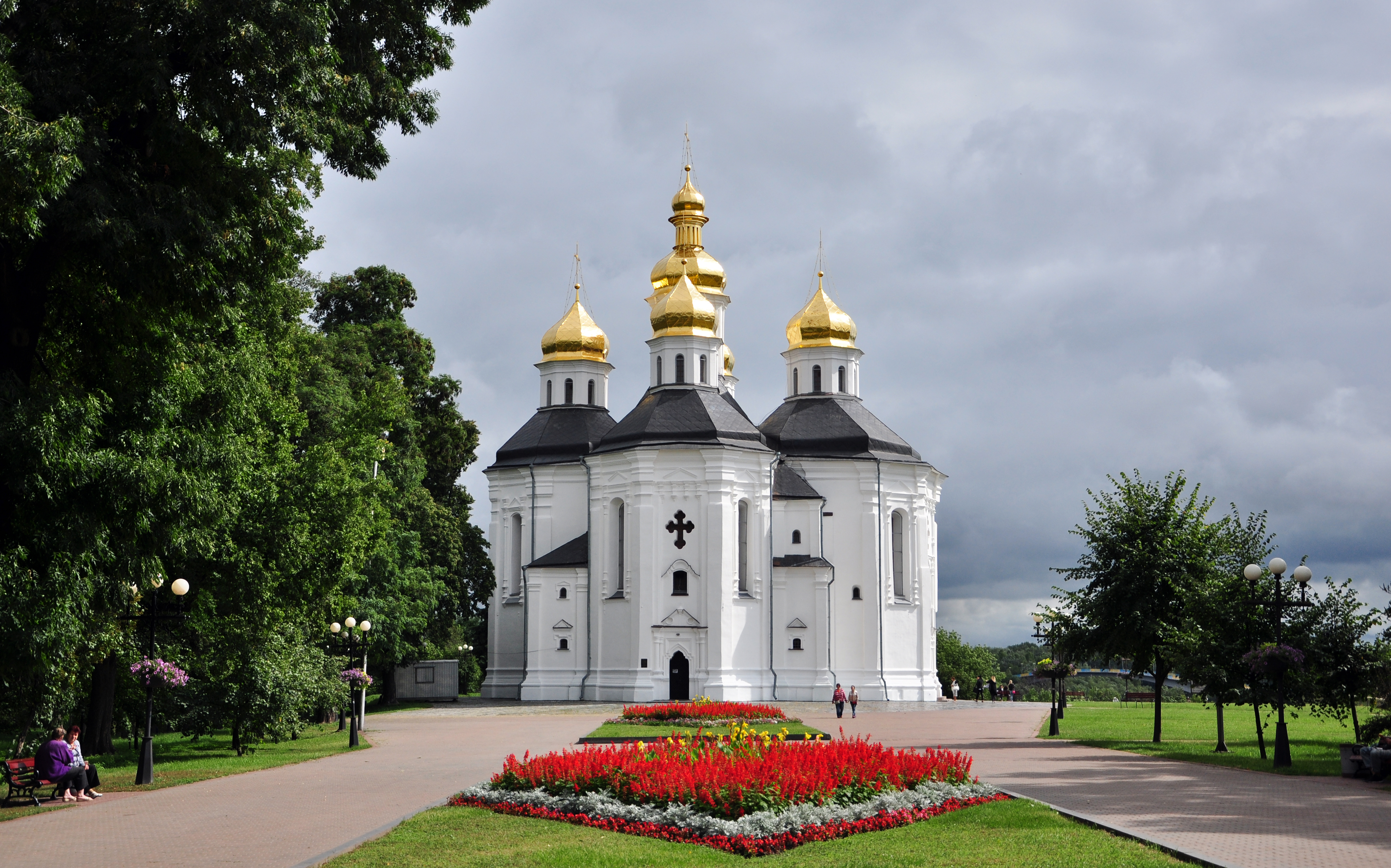

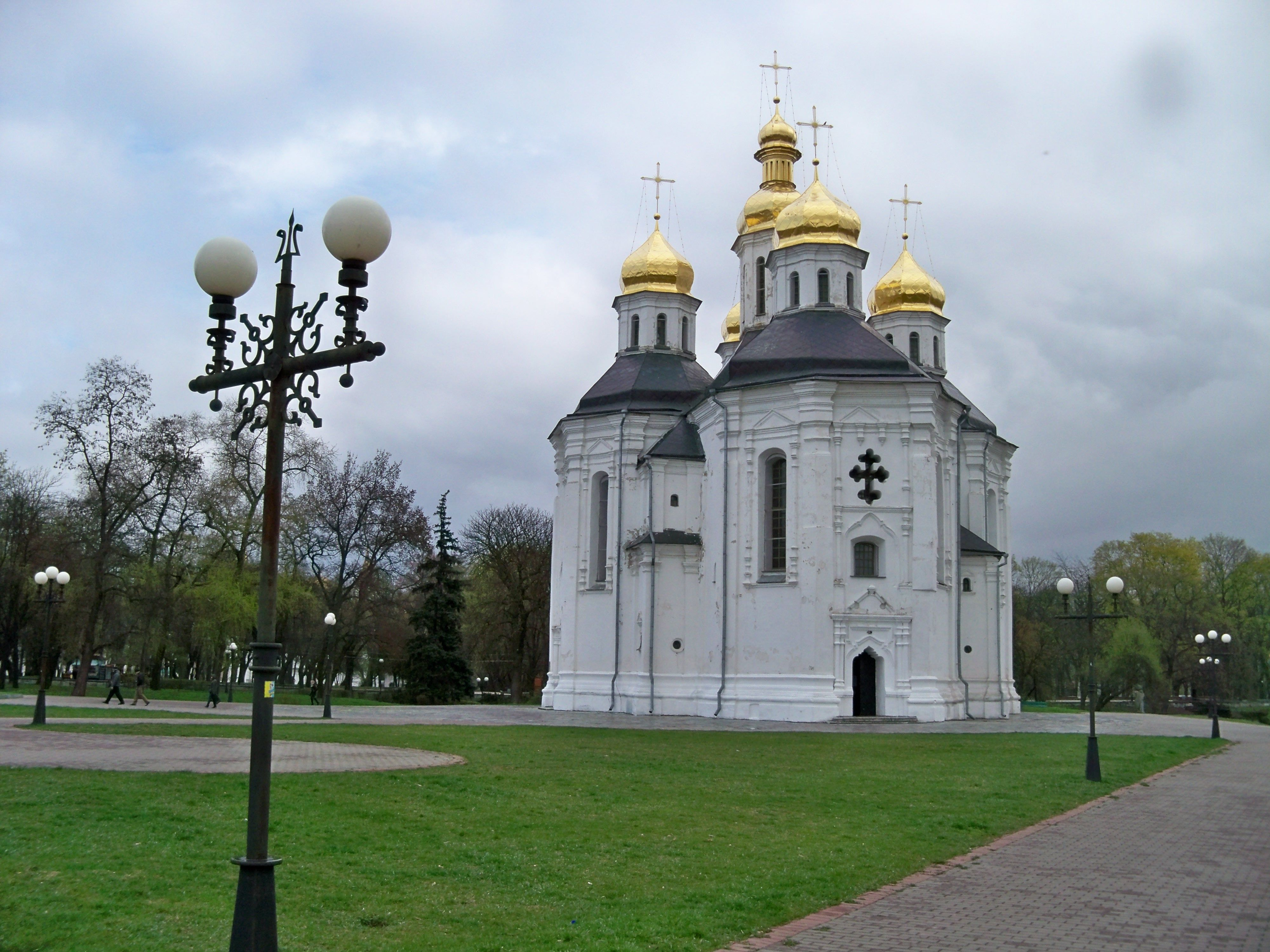

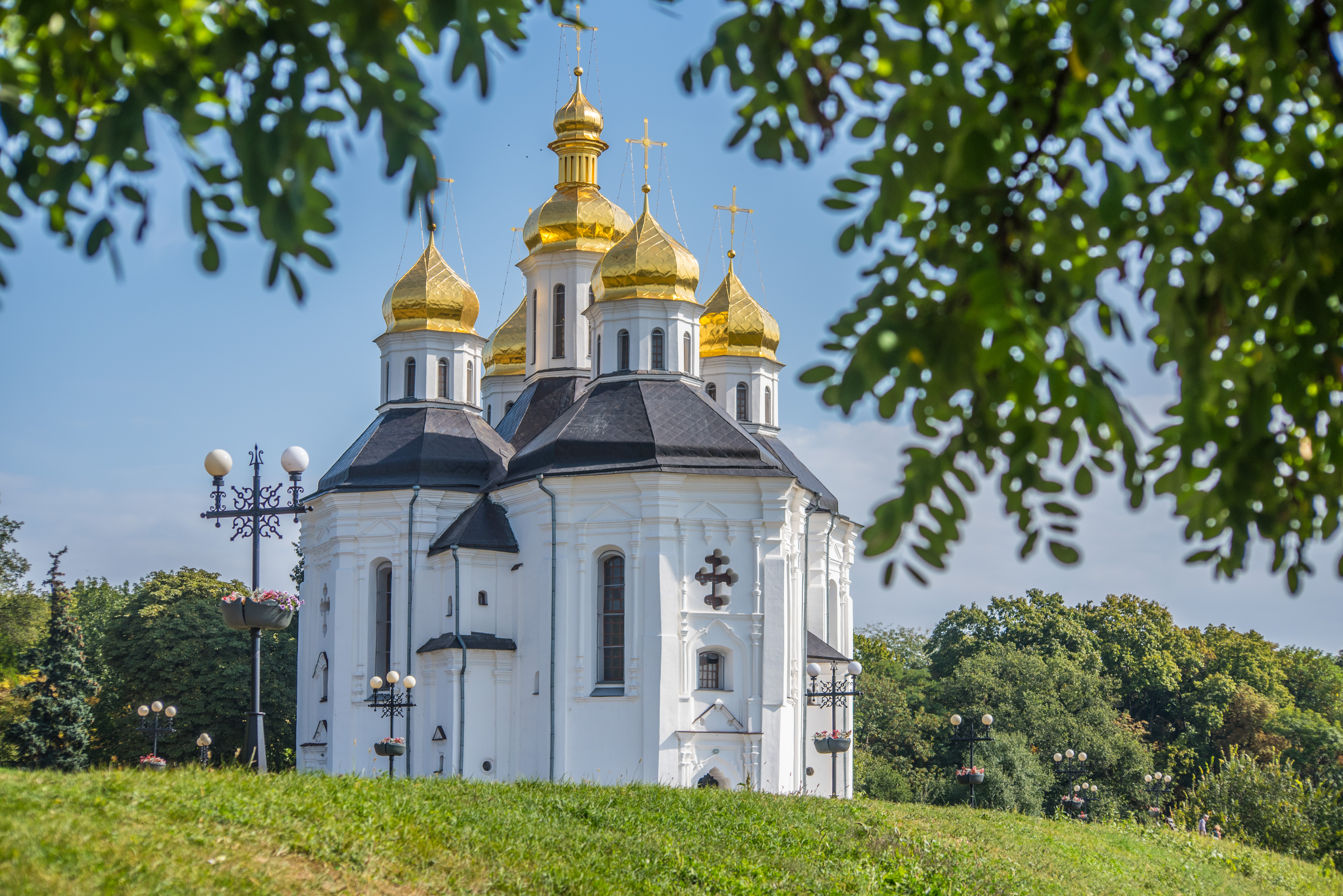

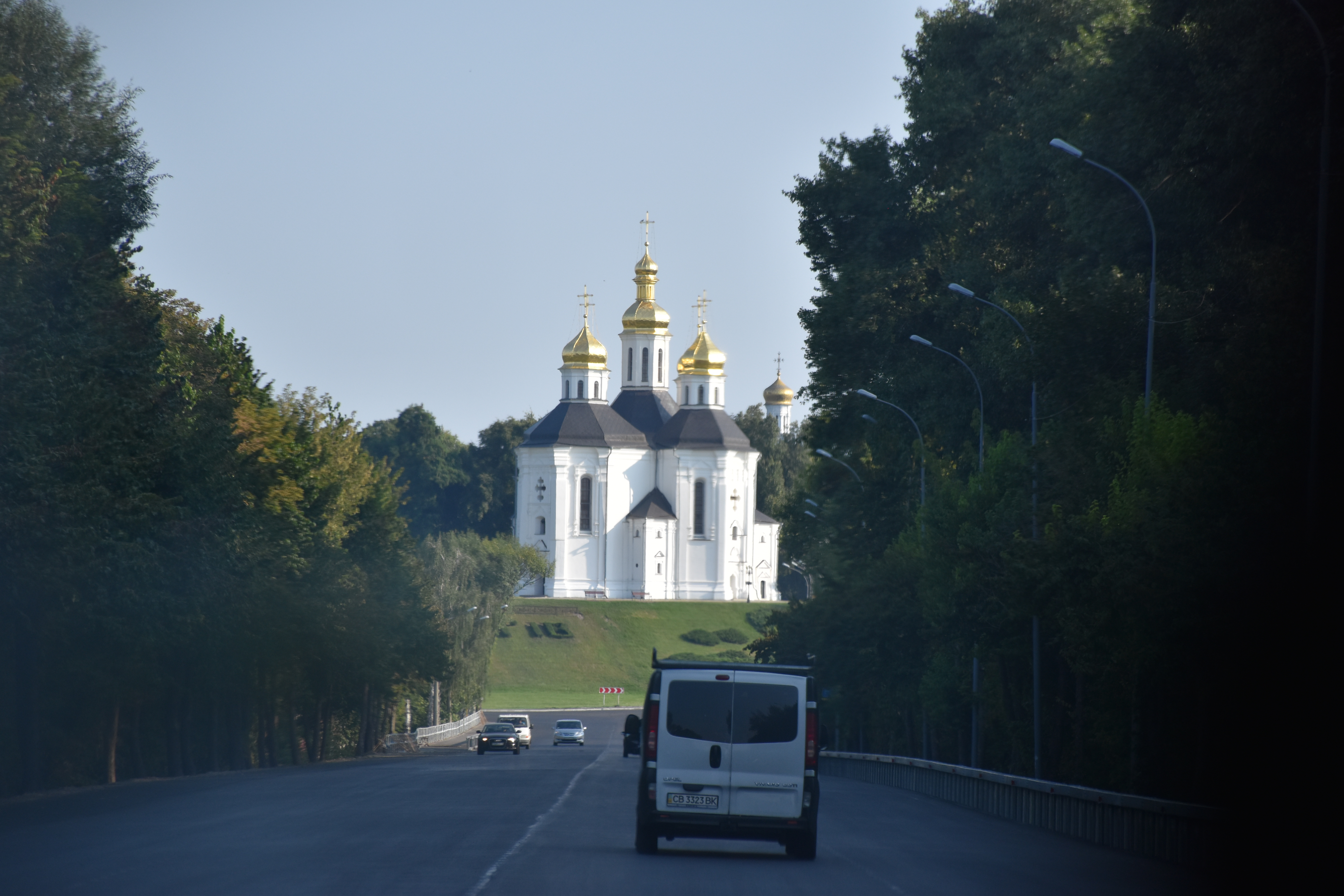

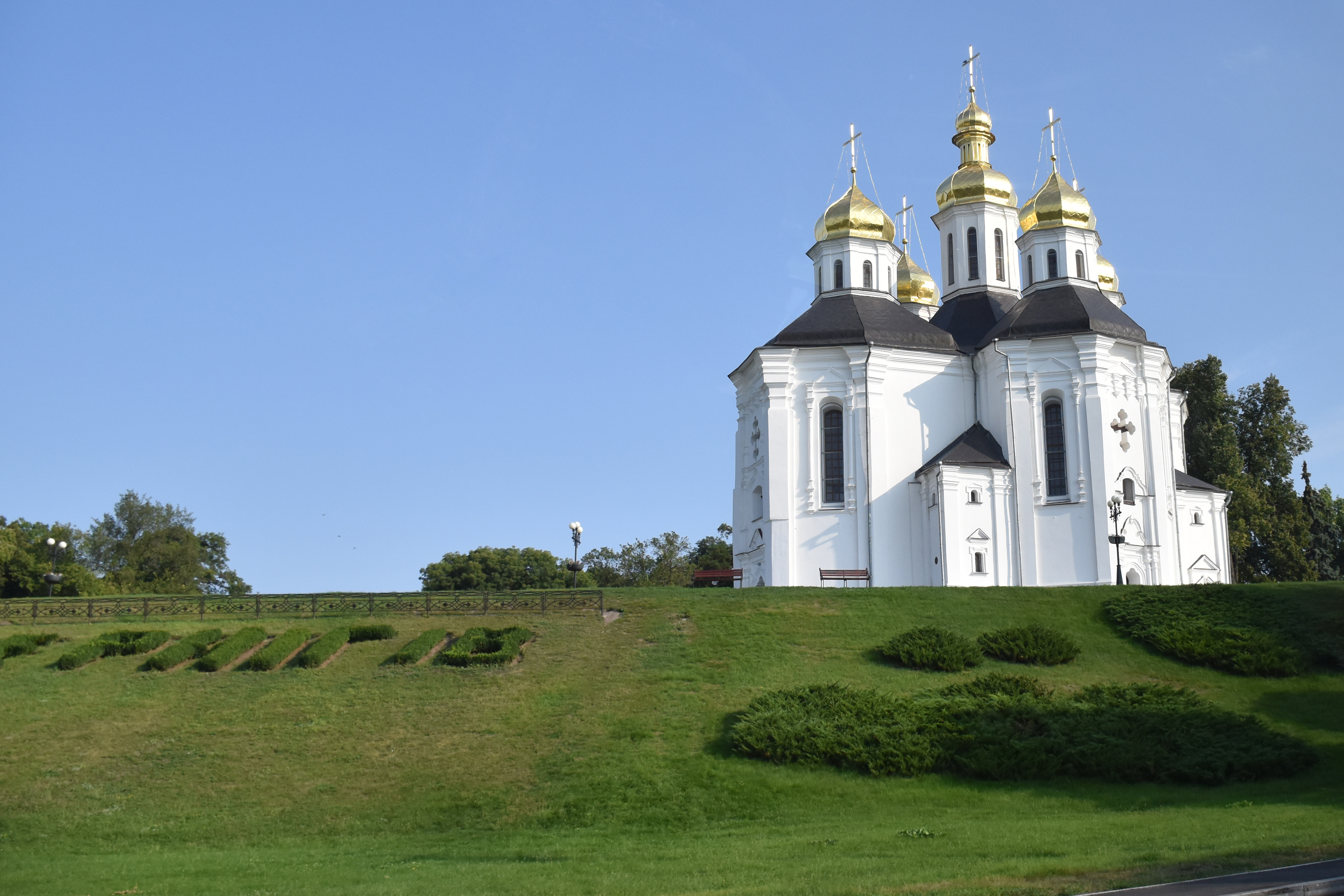

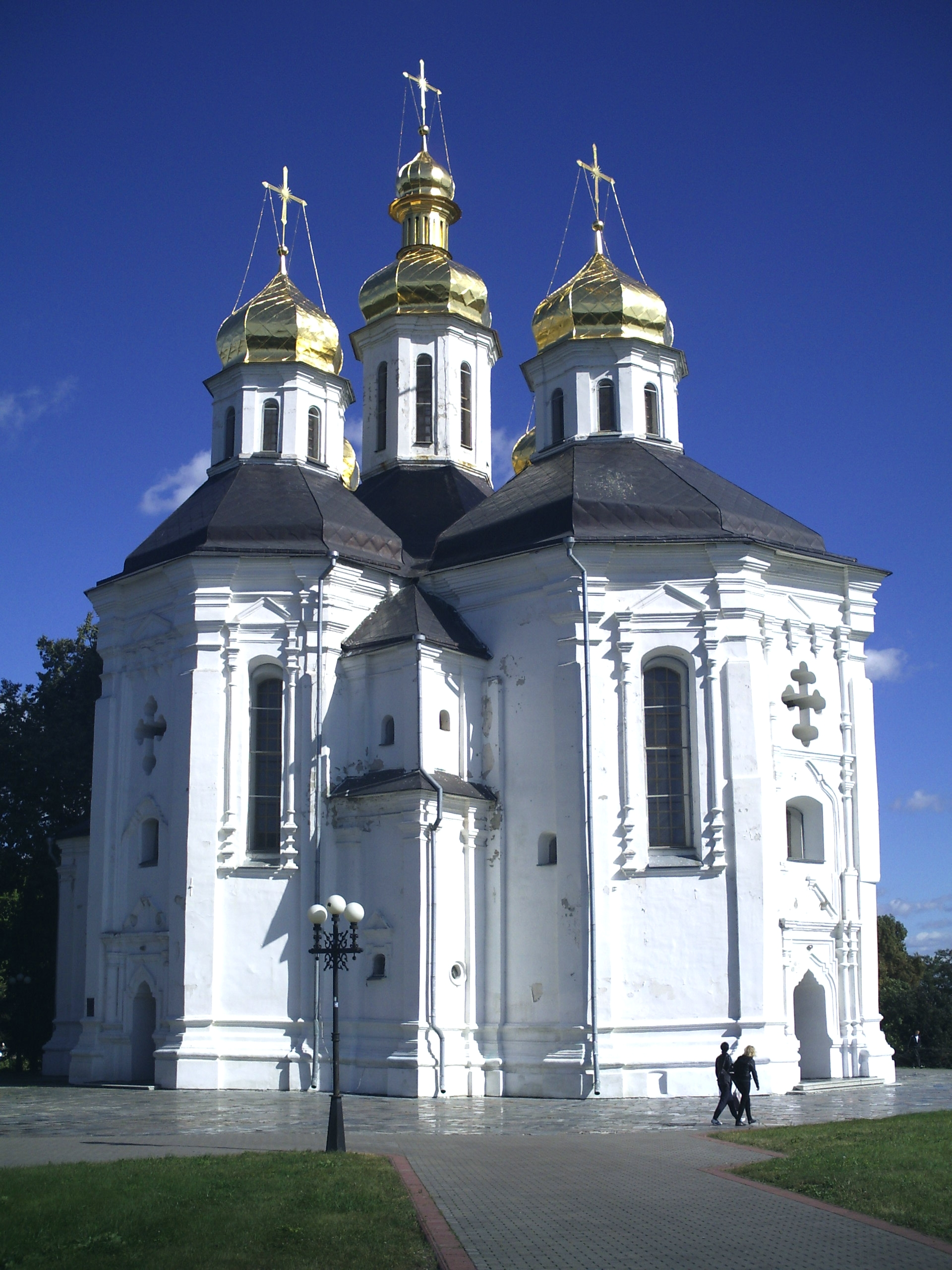

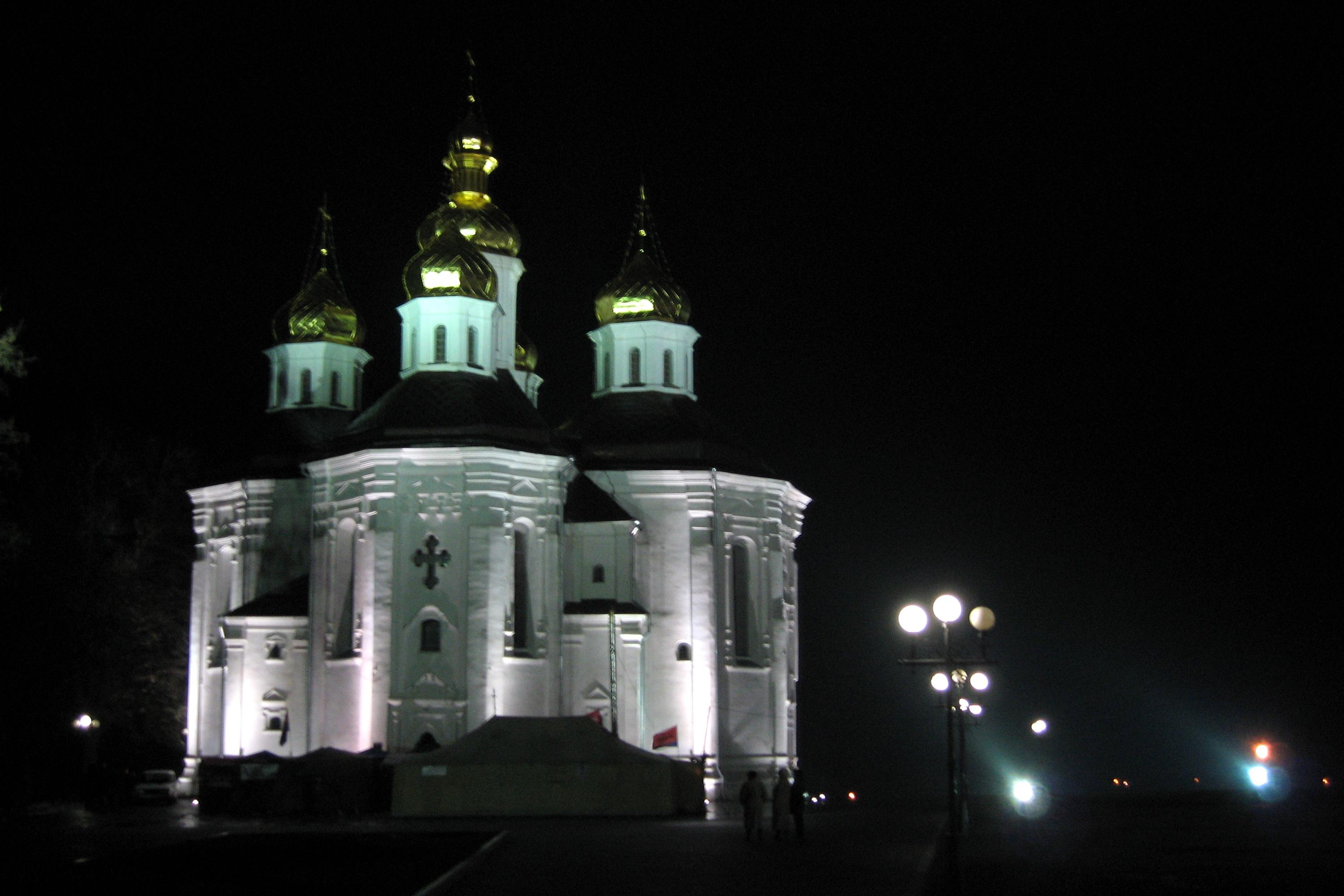

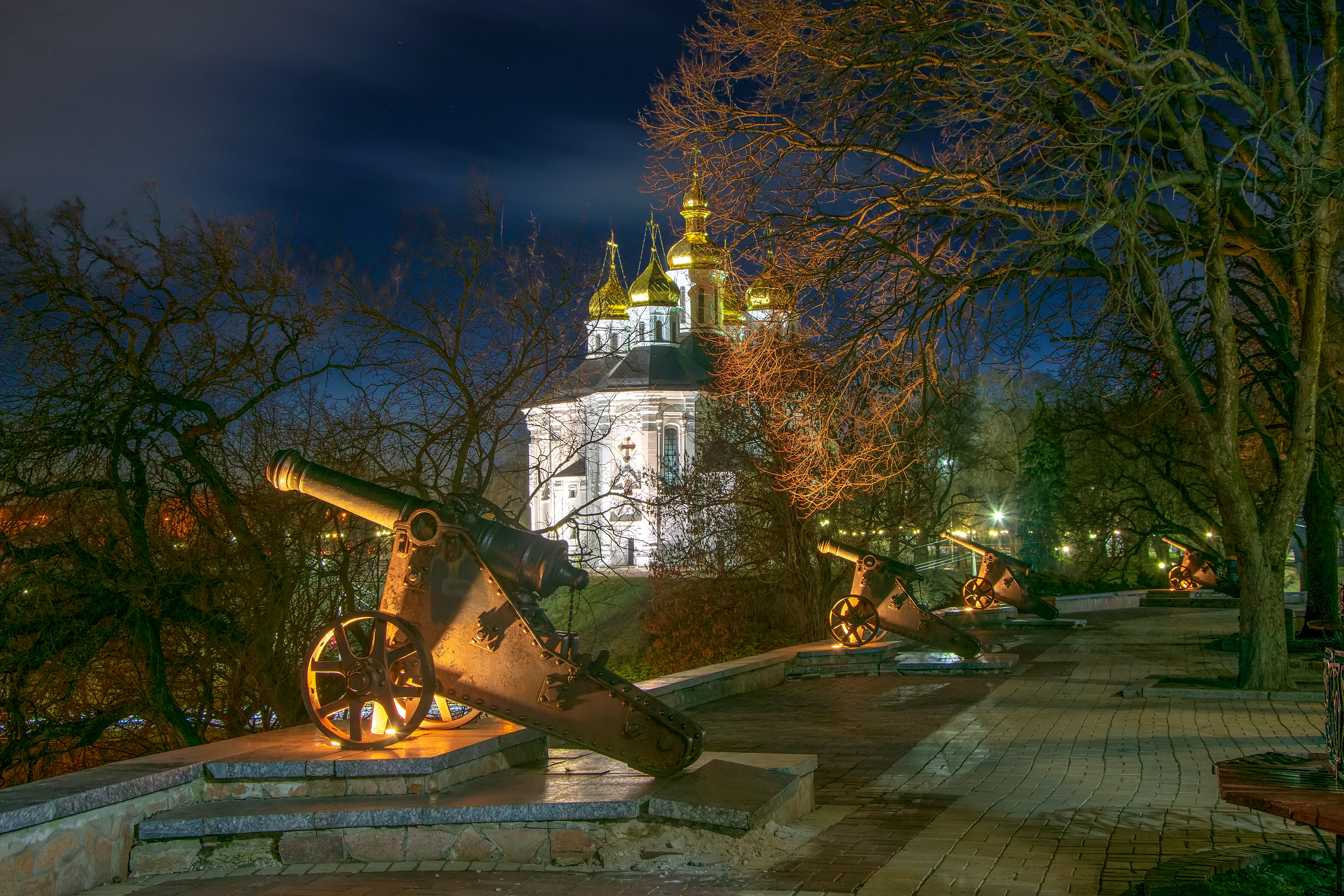

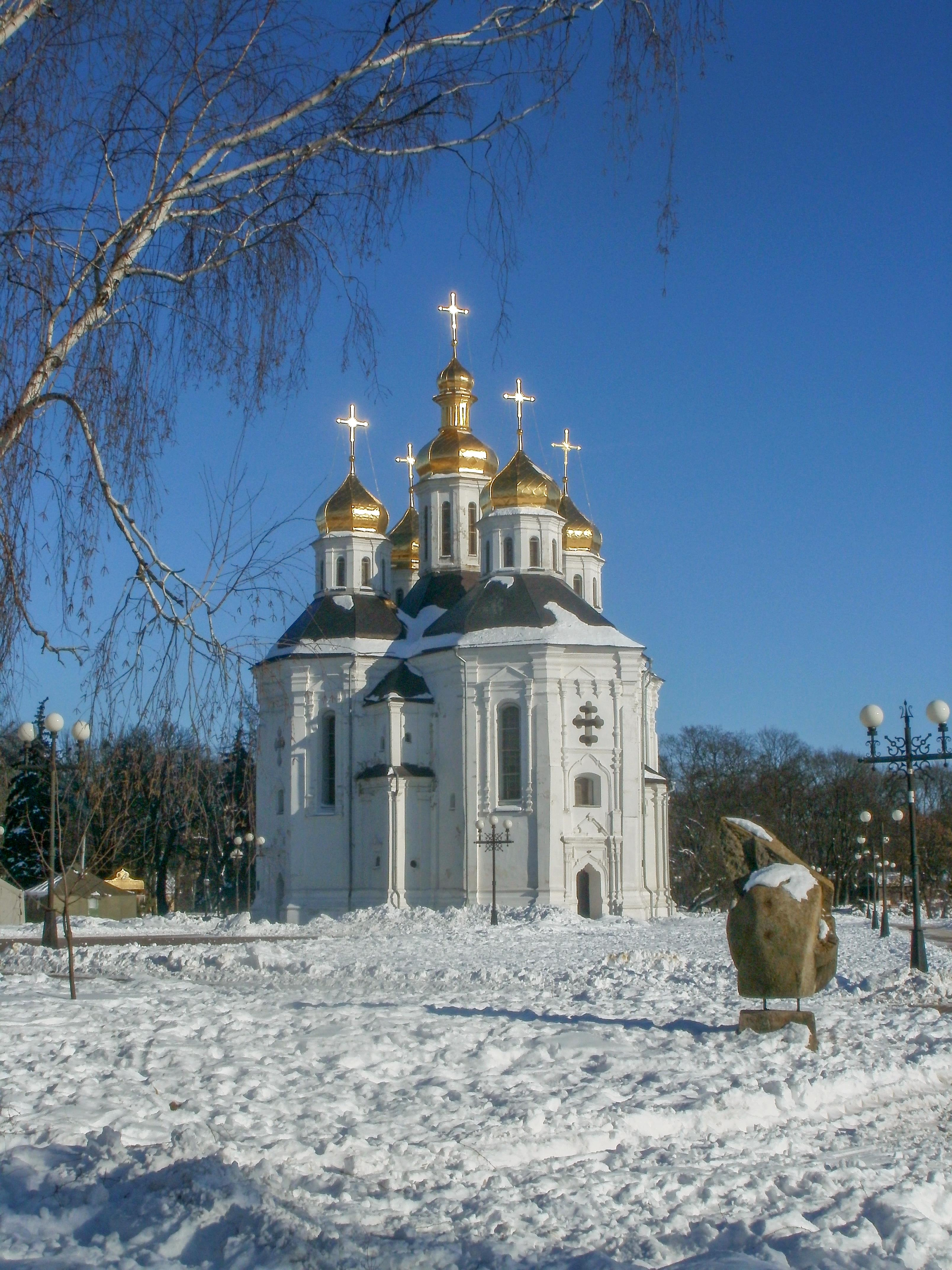

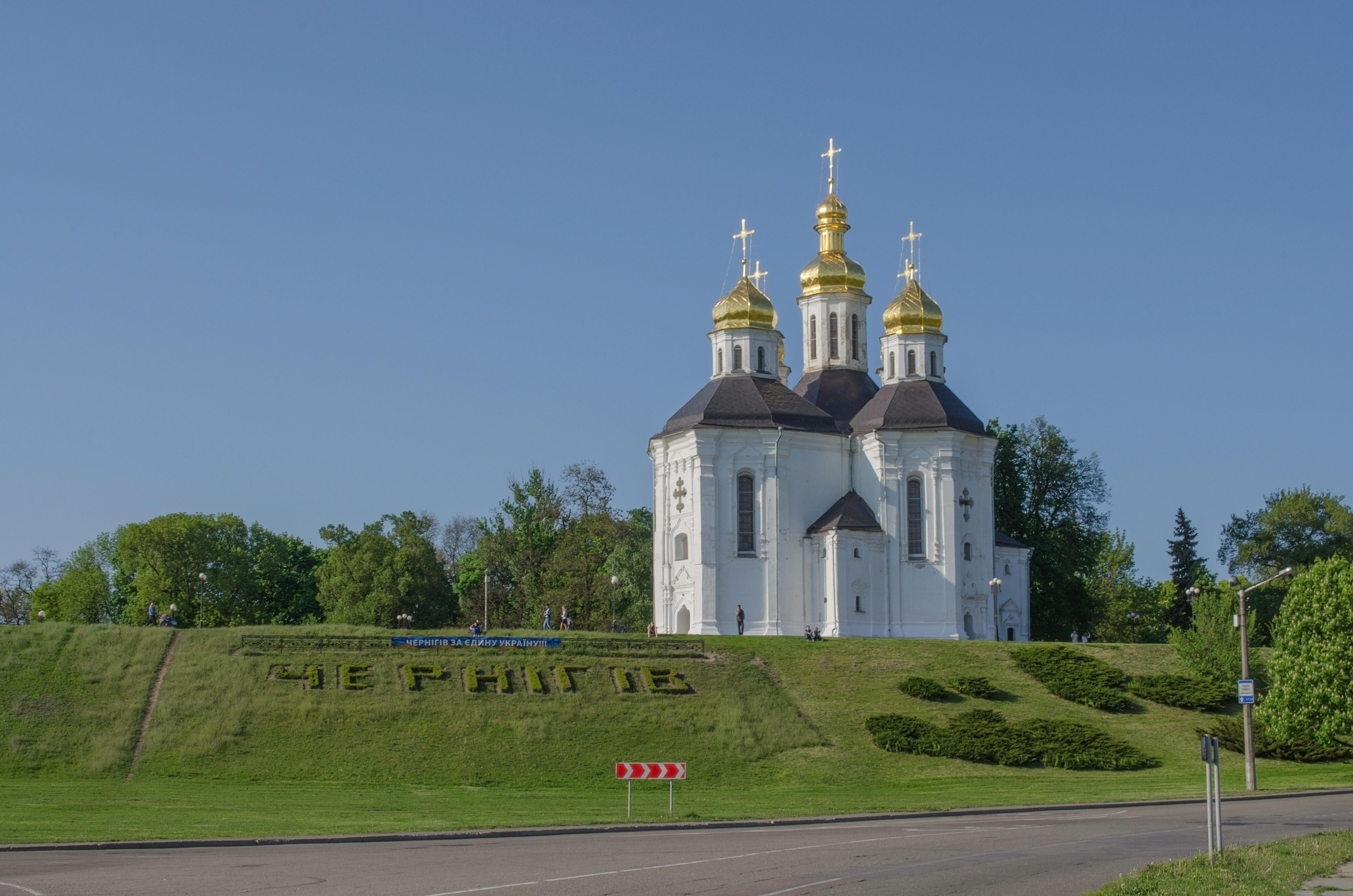

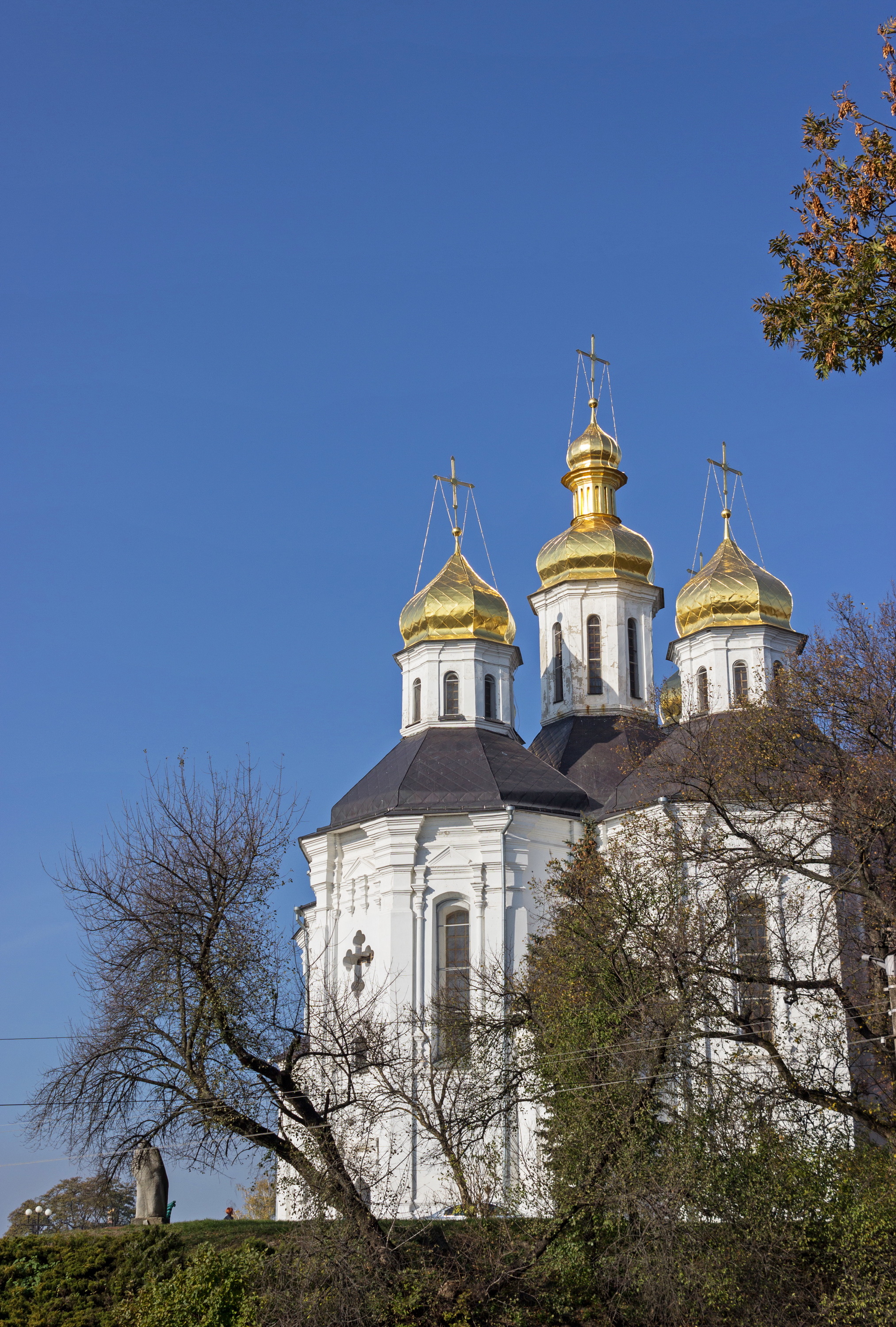

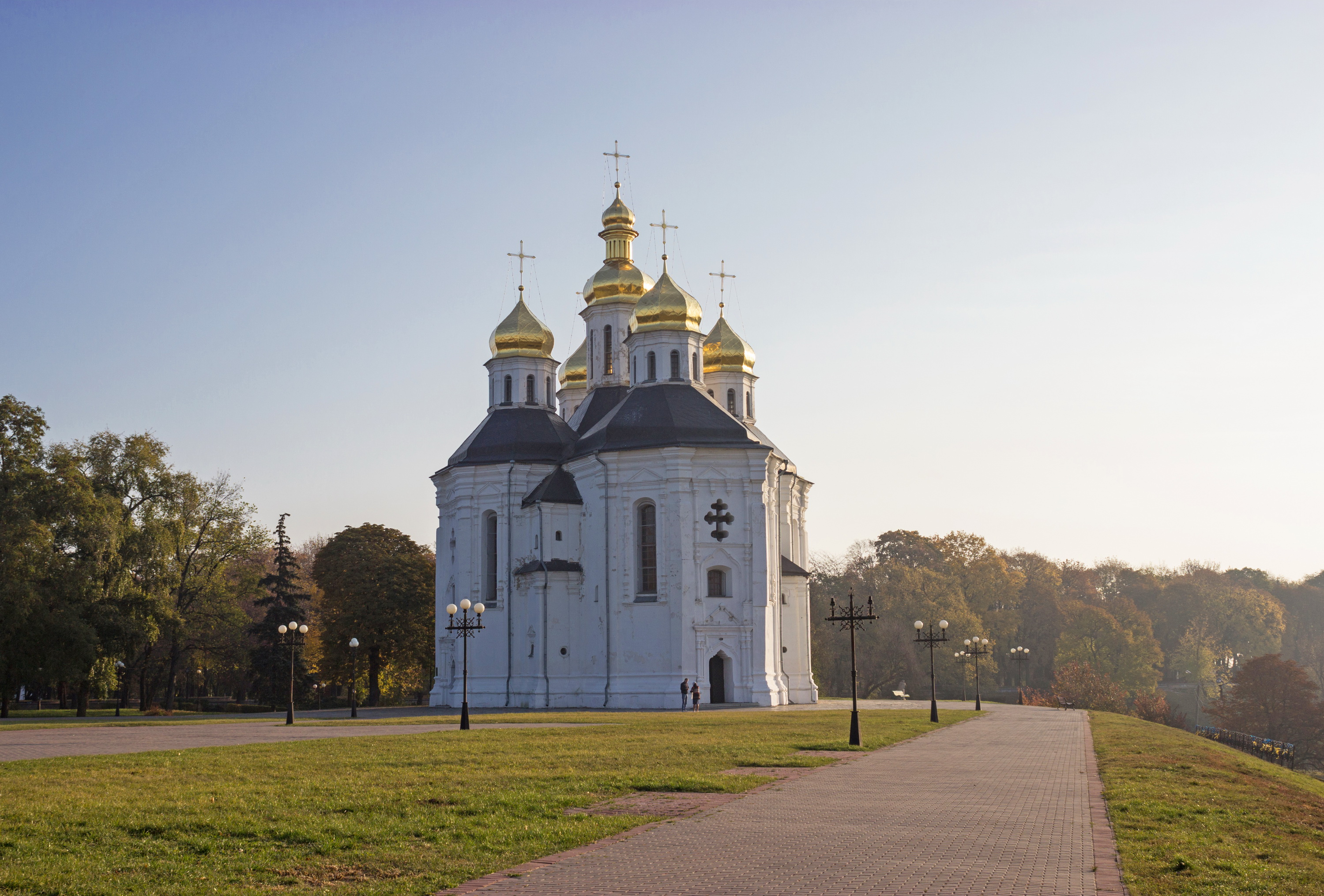

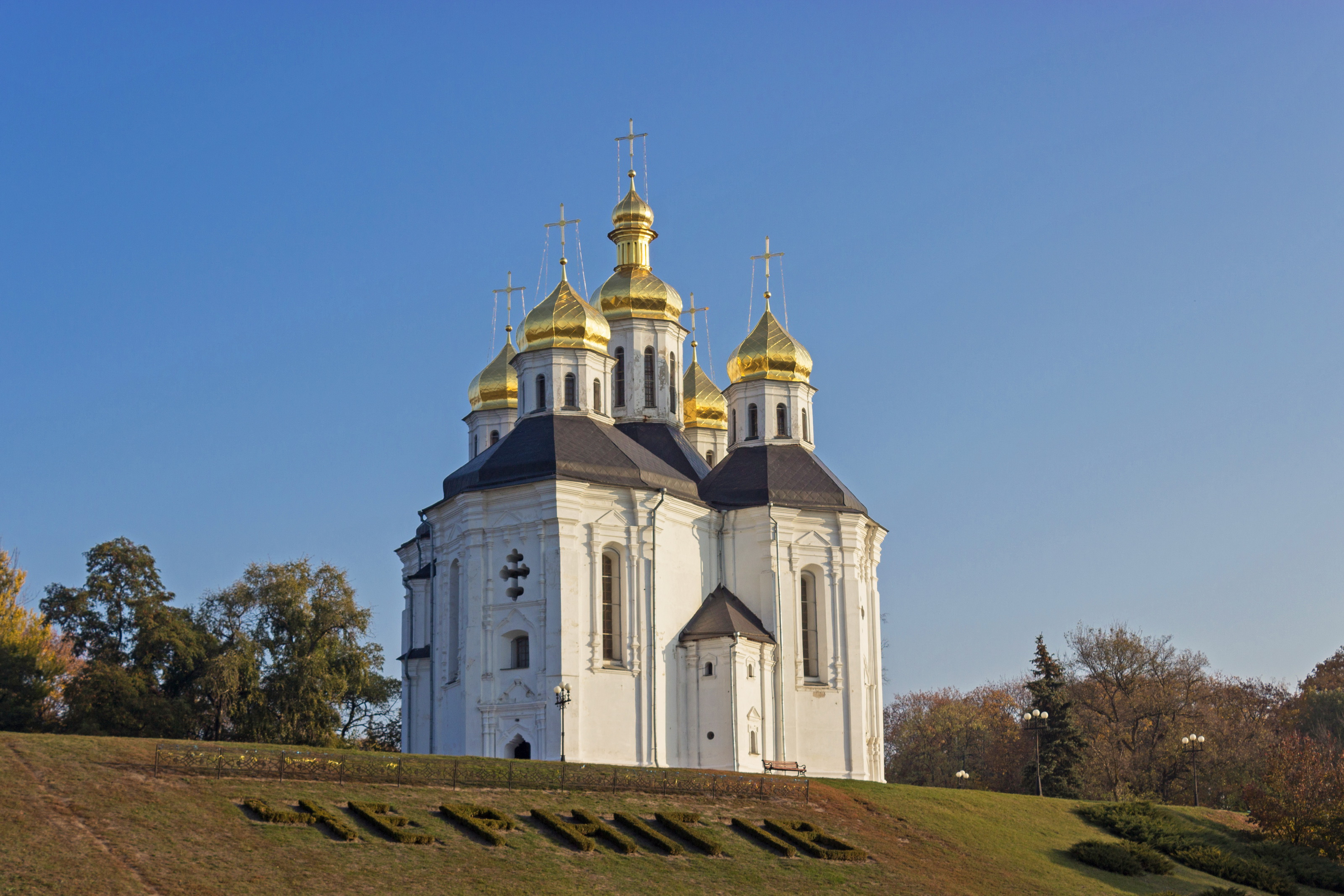

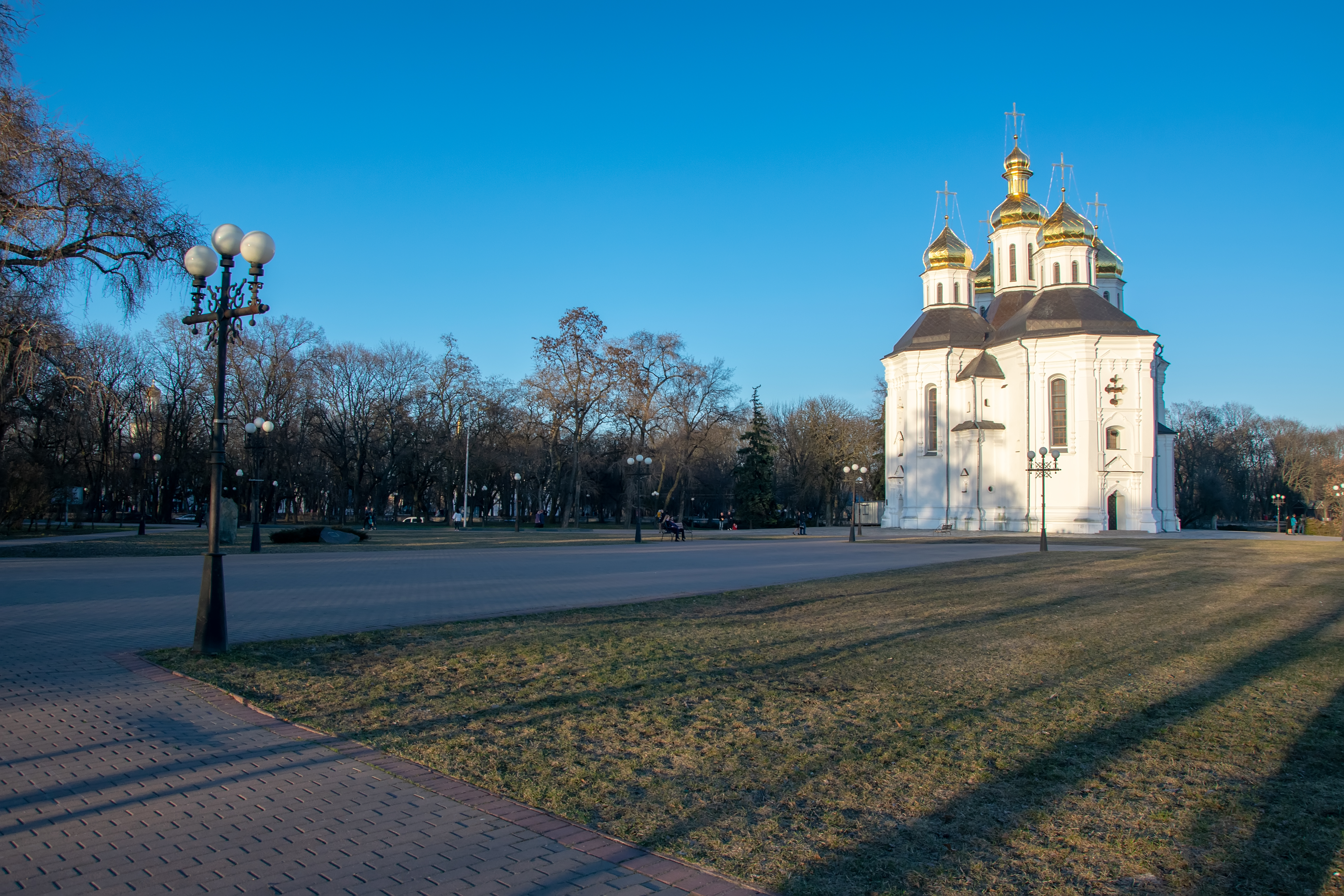

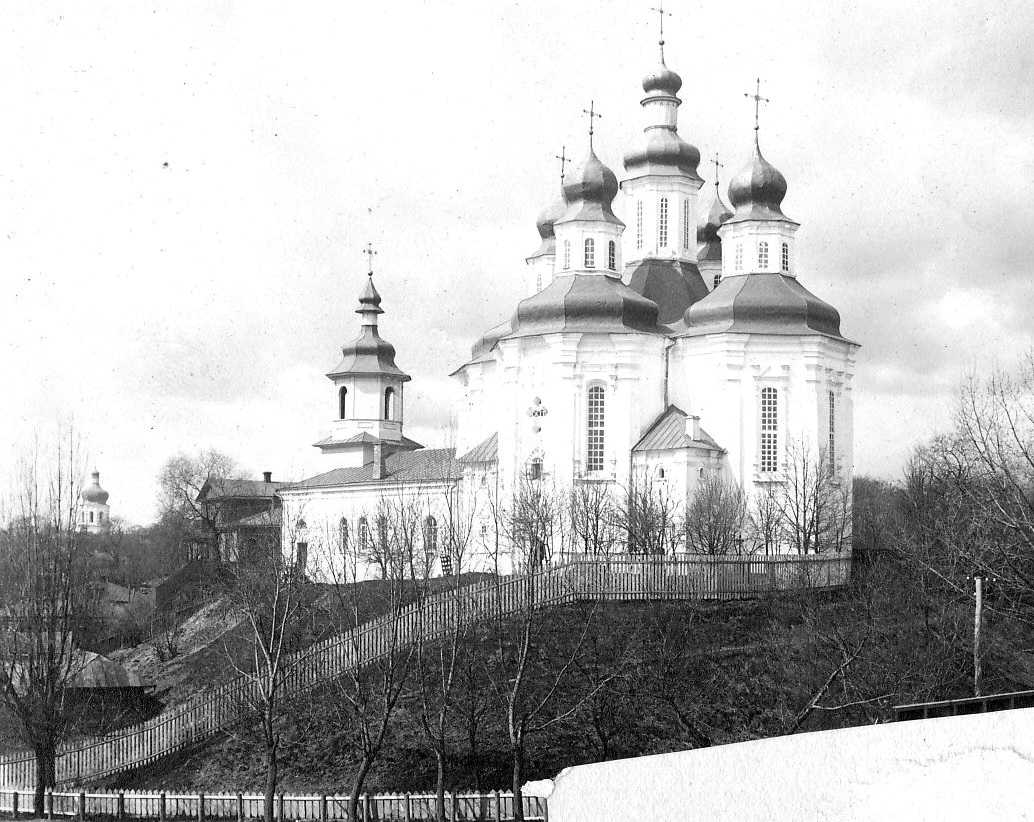

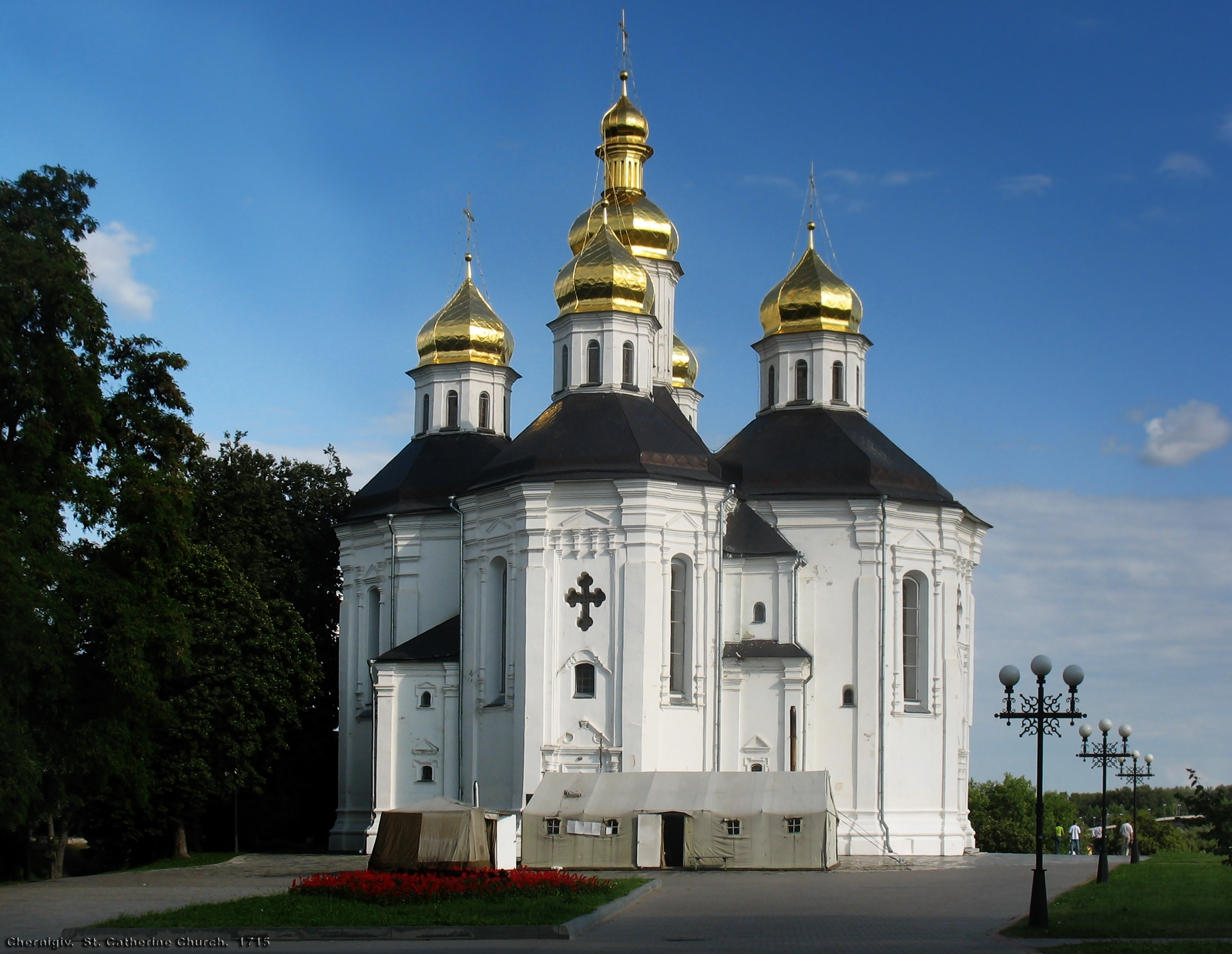

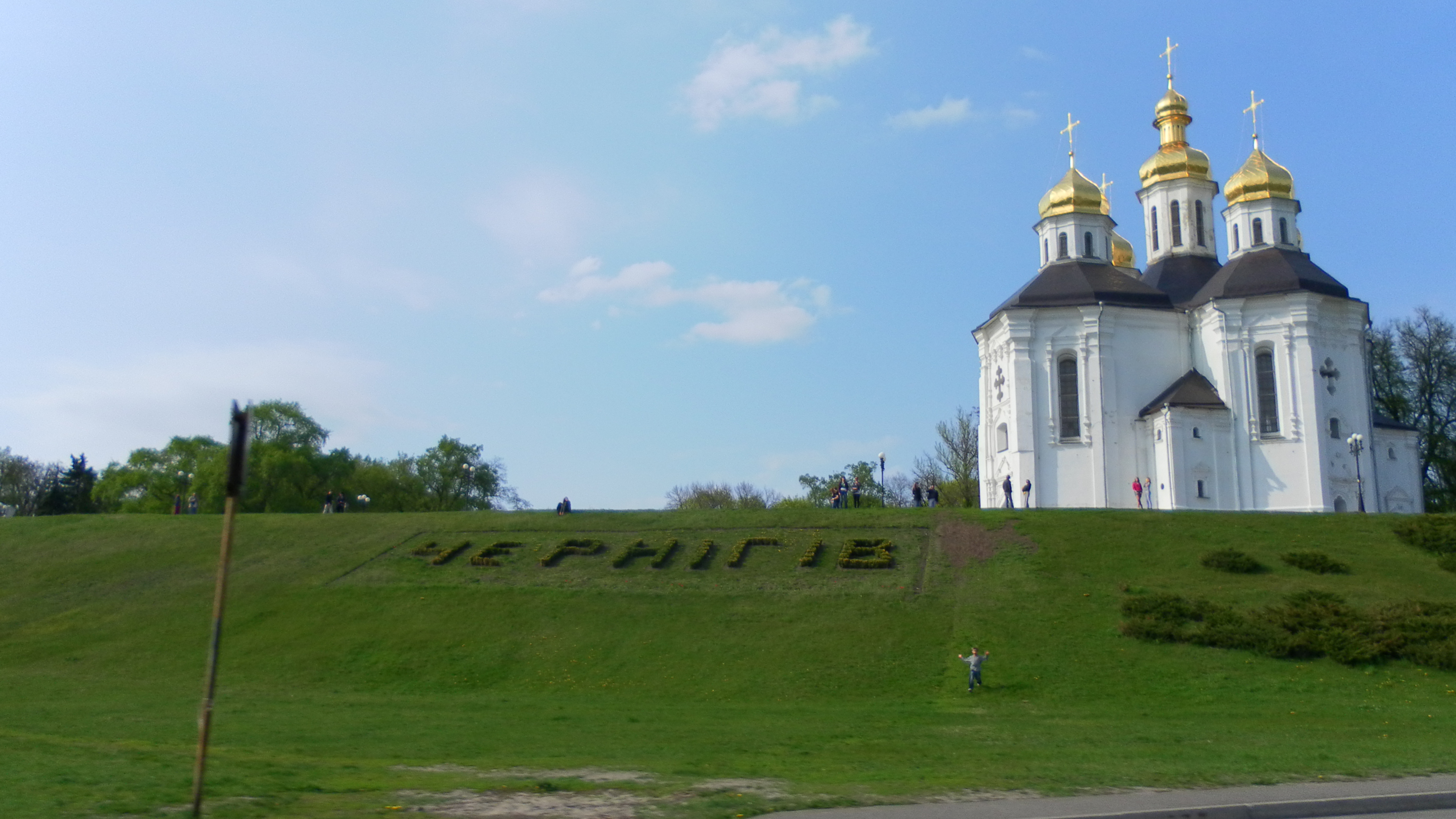

== See also ==
- List of Churches and Monasteries in Chernihiv
