= Ancient Chernihiv =

- Чернігів стародавній
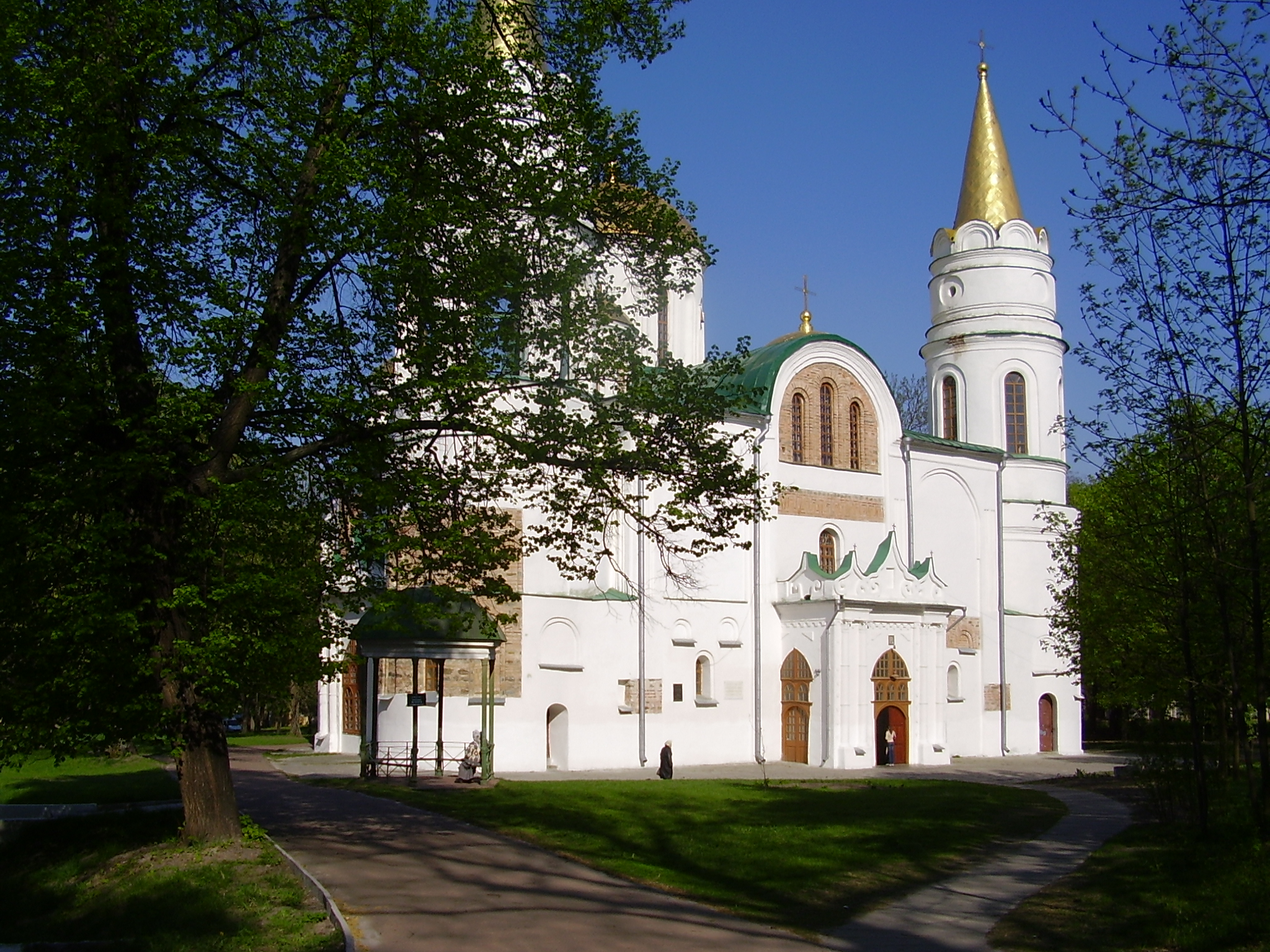
- Saviour-Transfiguration Cathedral of 11th century
- Interactive map of Ancient Chernihiv

General information
- Type: National Architecture-Historical Reserve
- Location: Chernihiv Oblast, Dytynets Park, Chernihiv, Ukraine
- Coordinates: 51°29′28″N 31°17′55″E
- Opened: State Reserve

Website
- oldchernihiv.com

Ancient Chernihiv (Ukrainian: Національний державний архітектурно-історичний заповідник «Чернігів стародавній», romanized: Chernihiv starodavnii) is the National Architecture-Historical Reserve located in the north-eastern Ukrainian city of Chernihiv. It was created at first as an affiliate of the National Reserve "Sophia of Kyiv". Since August 1, 1967, the site is a separate entity consisting of 34 monuments of architecture. In 2023–2024, UNESCO lead the efforts to rehabilitate the sites of the reserve bombed during the Russian invasion of Ukraine.

== Architectural landmarks ==
- Dytynets Park of Chernihiv, also known as Chernihiv's motte (earthworks)
- Saviour-Transfiguration Cathedral
- Boris and Gleb Cathedral
- Chernihiv's Collegium
- House of Lyzohub (Colonel of the Chernigov Regiment)
- Piatnytska Church
- Catherine's Church
- Yelets-Dormition Monastery
- Black Grave (kurgan)
- Boldyni Hory
- Saint Anthony's Caves
- Trinity and St. Elijah's Monastery (Trinity Cathedral, St. Elijah's Church, Presentation Church)
- Monument to Ivan Mazepa
- Monument to Prince Igor

Since 1989, the site is placed on the tentative list of World Heritage Sites of the United Nations Educational, Scientific and Cultural Organization (UNESCO), receiving its reference number 668. According to the description, the site only includes Saviour-Transfiguration Cathedral and Borysohlibskyi Cathedral. As of 2023, the creation of a renewed nomination was underway, and it will include the central part of Dytynets, Yeletska Hora with the ensemble of Yelets Monastery, Black Grave, Boldyna Hora with the 10th century kurgan grave field, and the complex of the Trinity Monastery. As of December 2025, the nomination process has slowed down, primarily due to disputes between the regional and local governments.

== Gallery ==
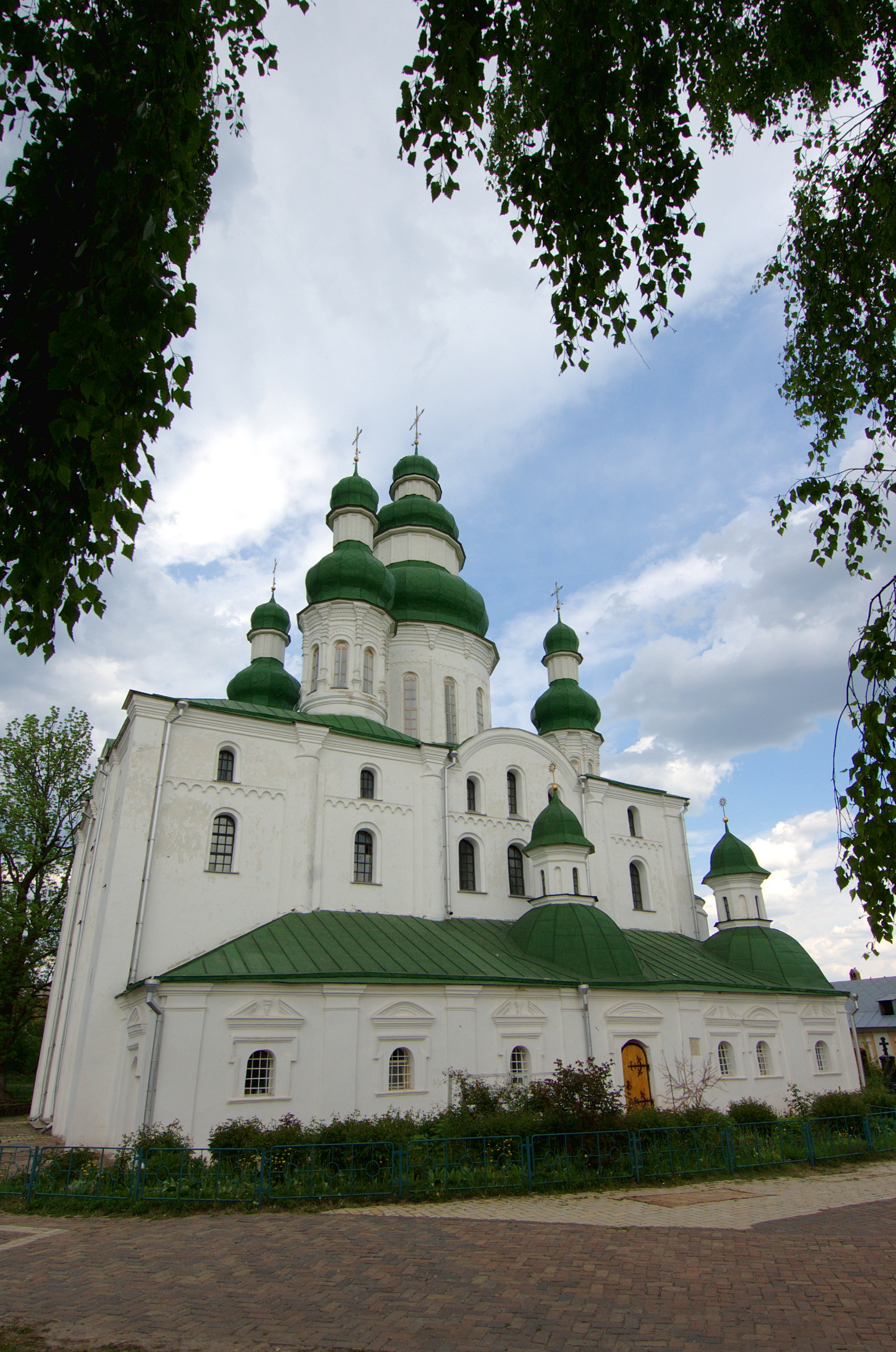
Yelets-Dormition Monastery's cathedral was modeled after that of Kyiv Pechersk Lavra

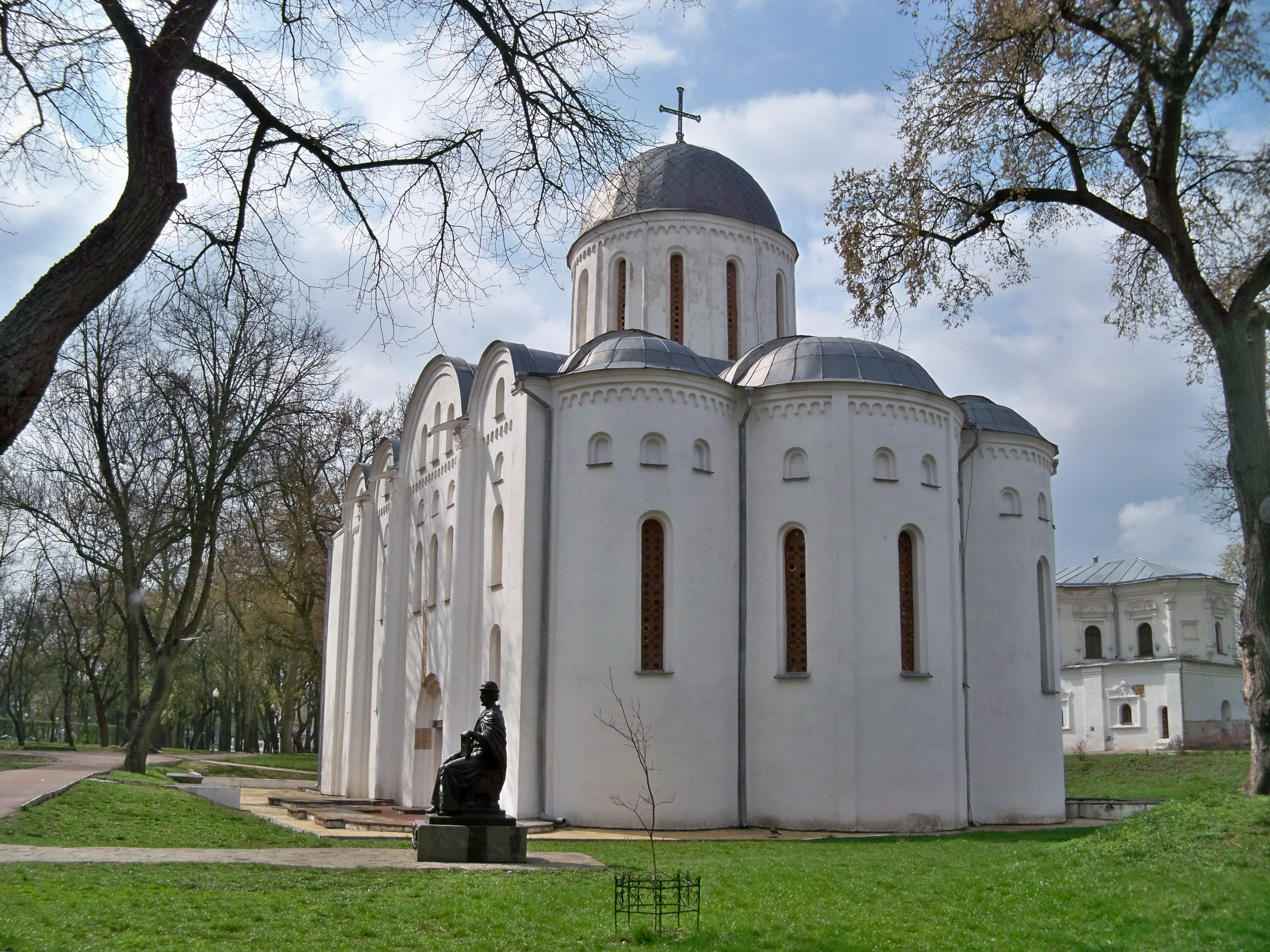
Borys and Hlib Cathedral in front of Saviour-Transfiguration Cathedral

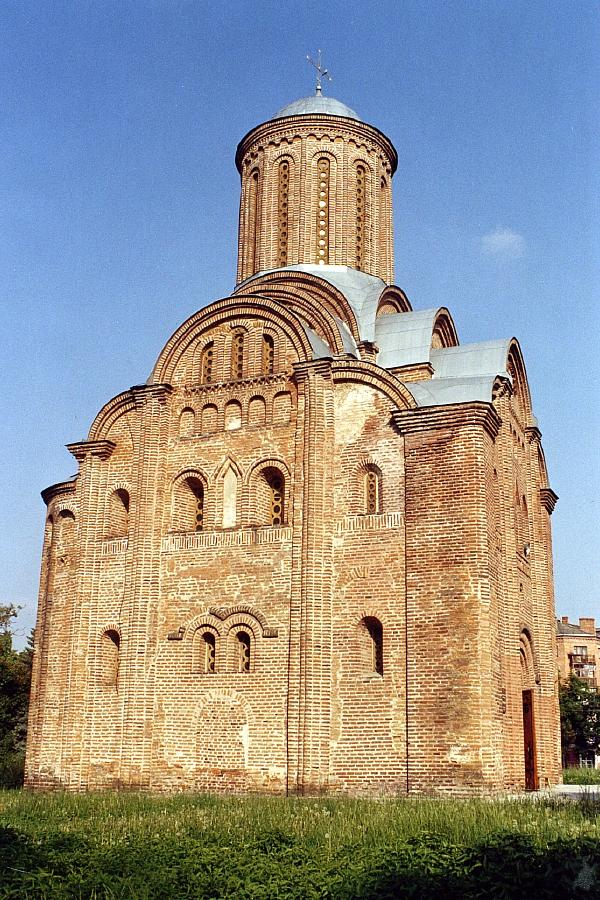
The Piatnytska Church (c. 1201, restored after World War II)

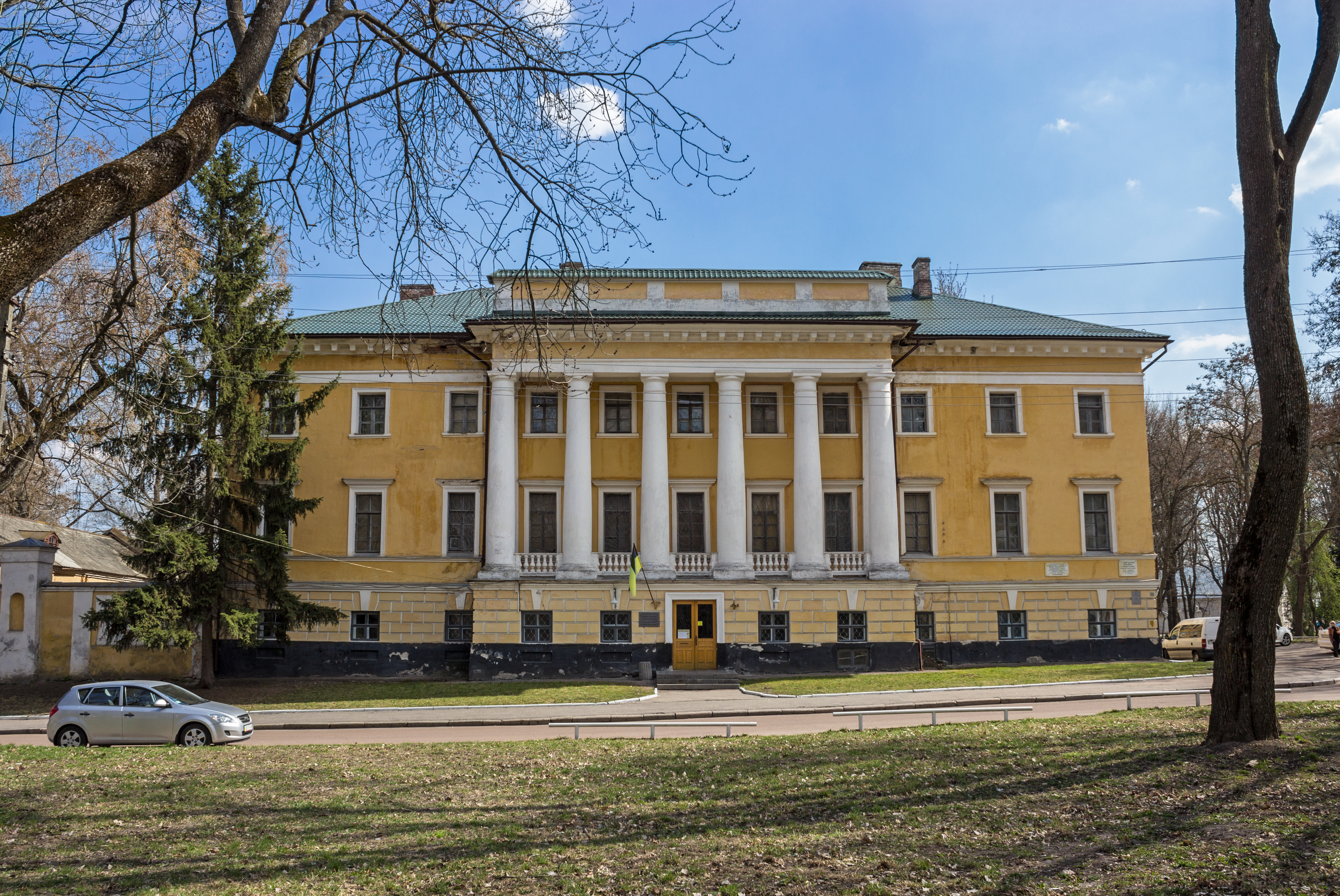
Chernihiv Regional Art Museum

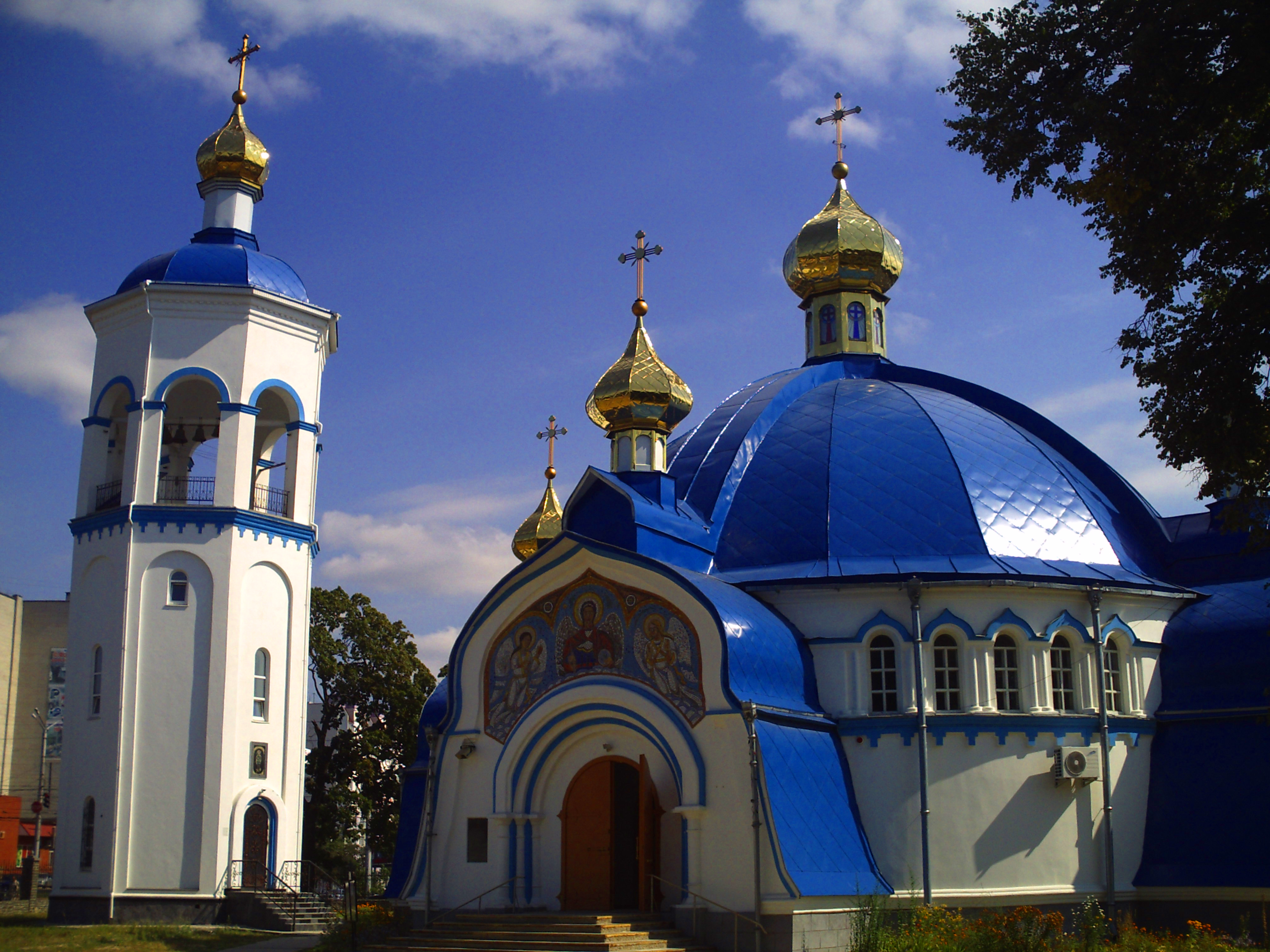
Church of the Archangel Michael

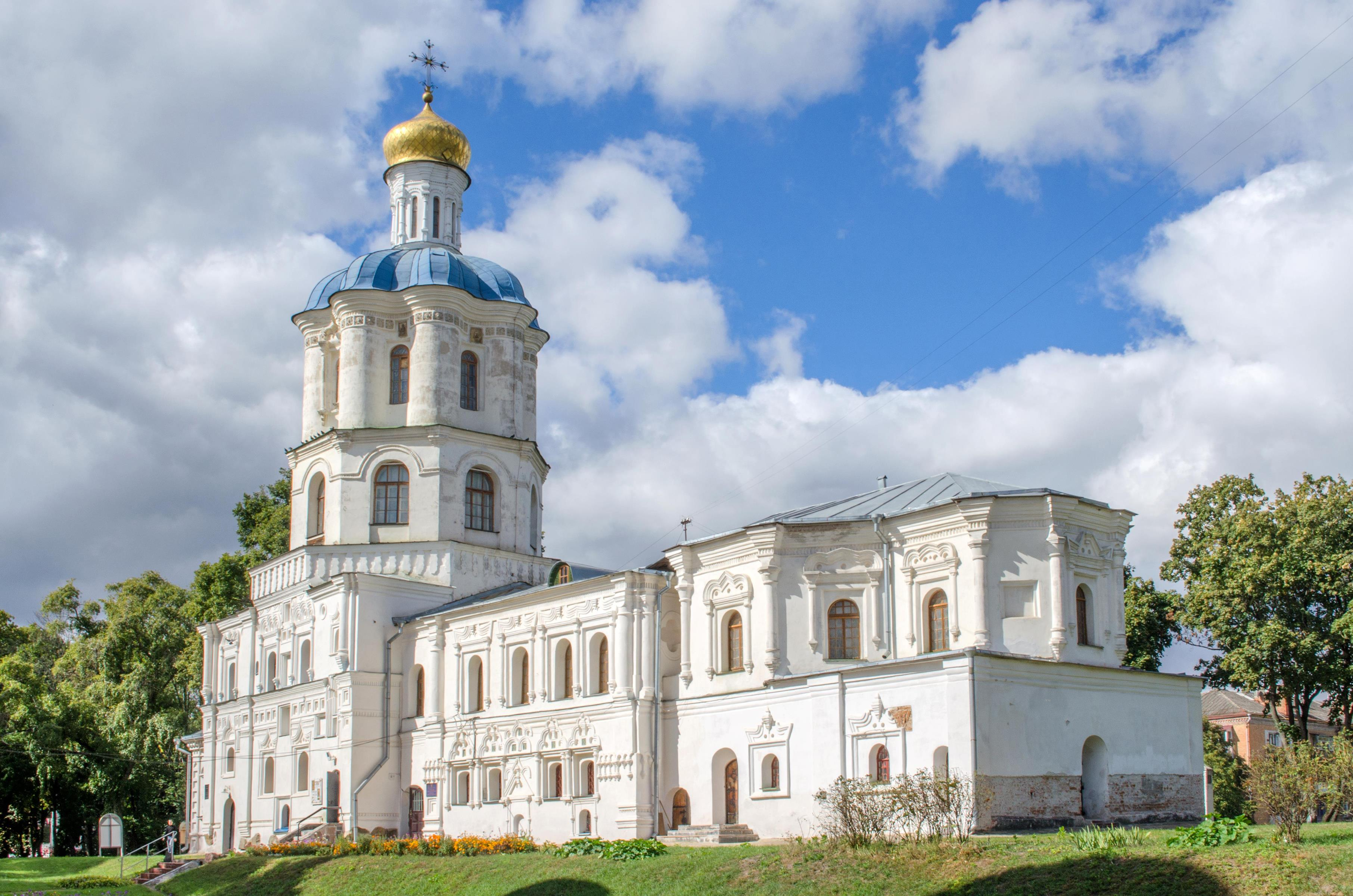
Chernihiv Collegium

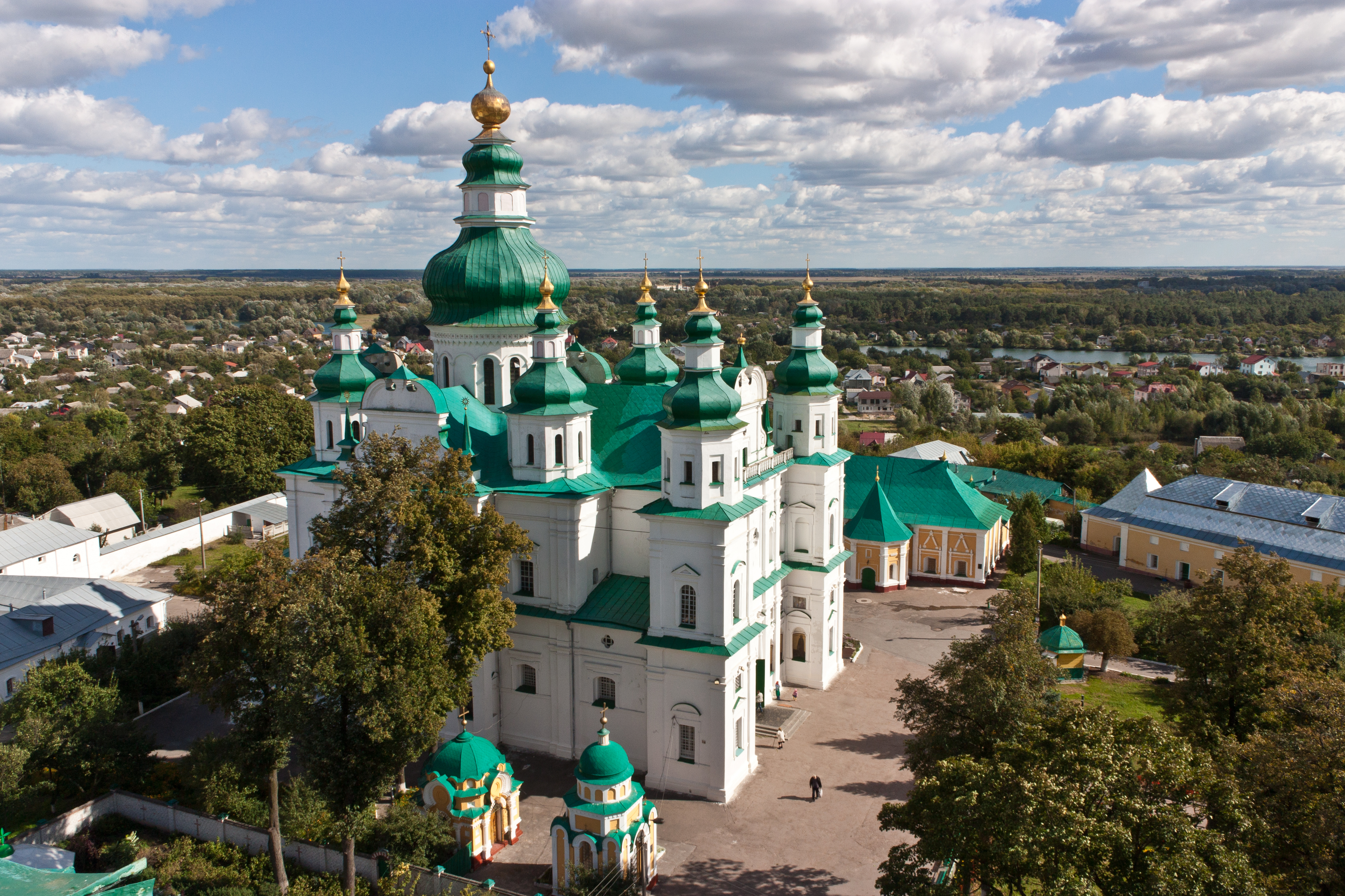
Trinity Monastery

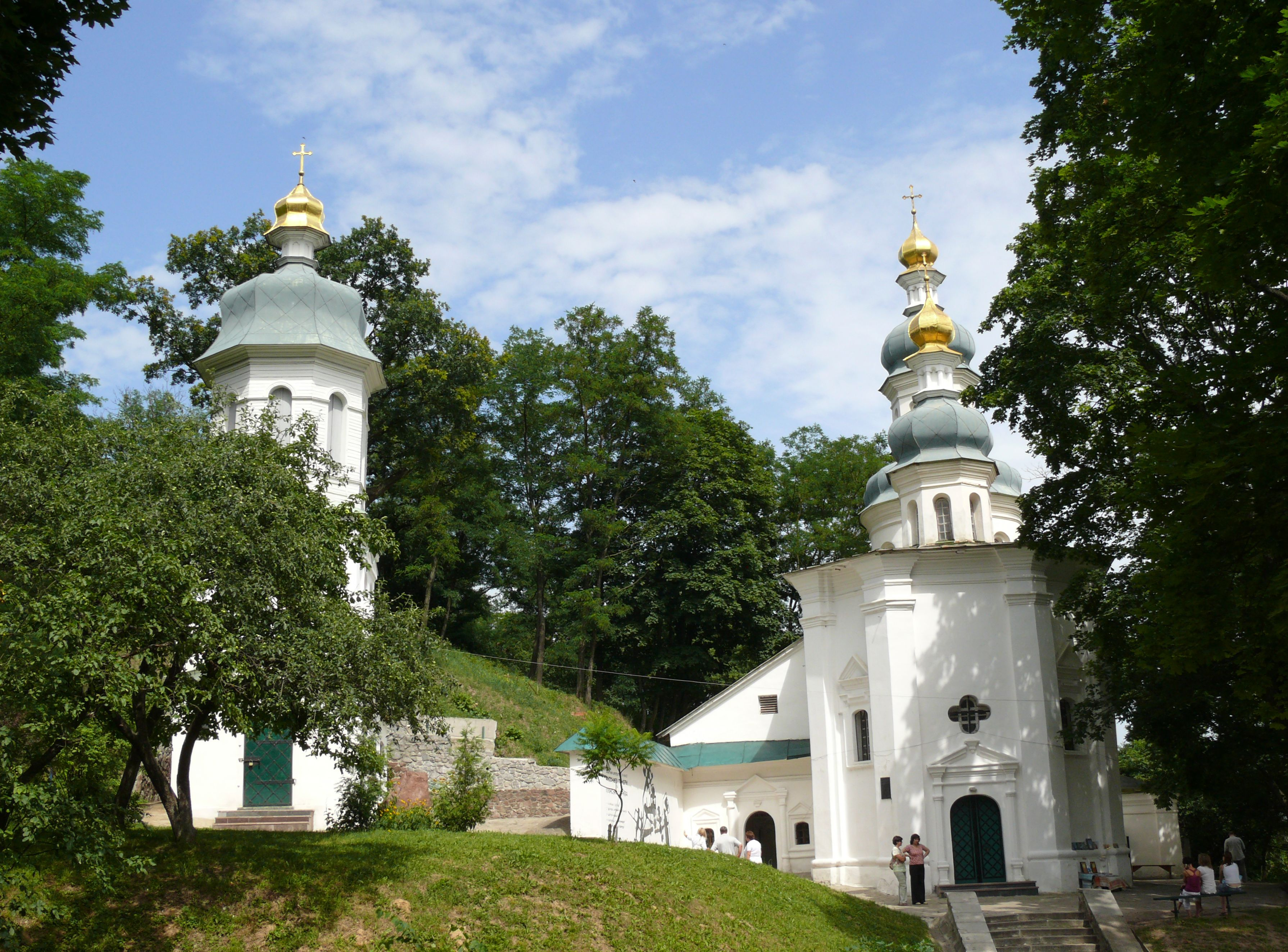
Church of St. Elijah and its bell tower

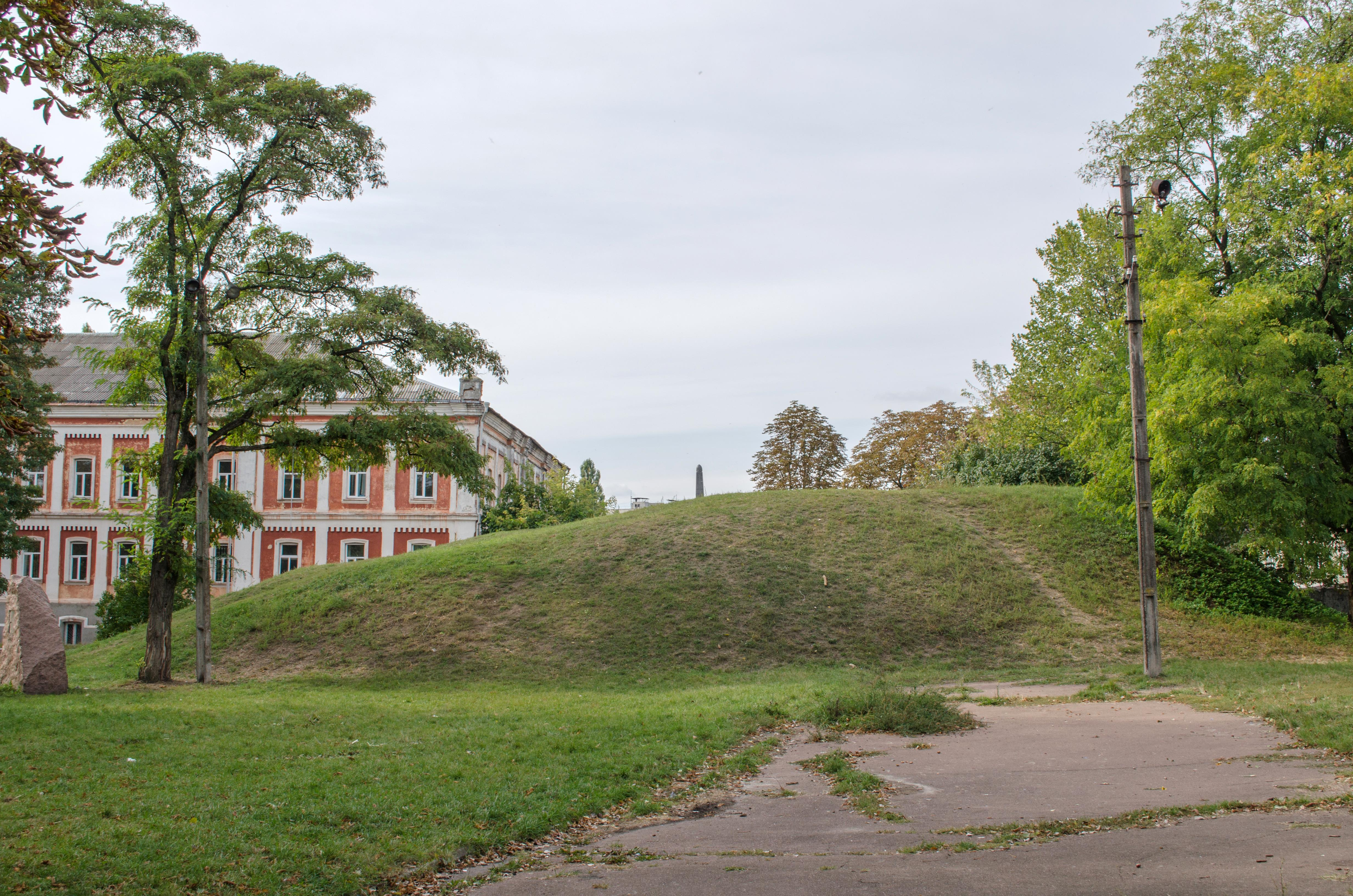
Black Grave

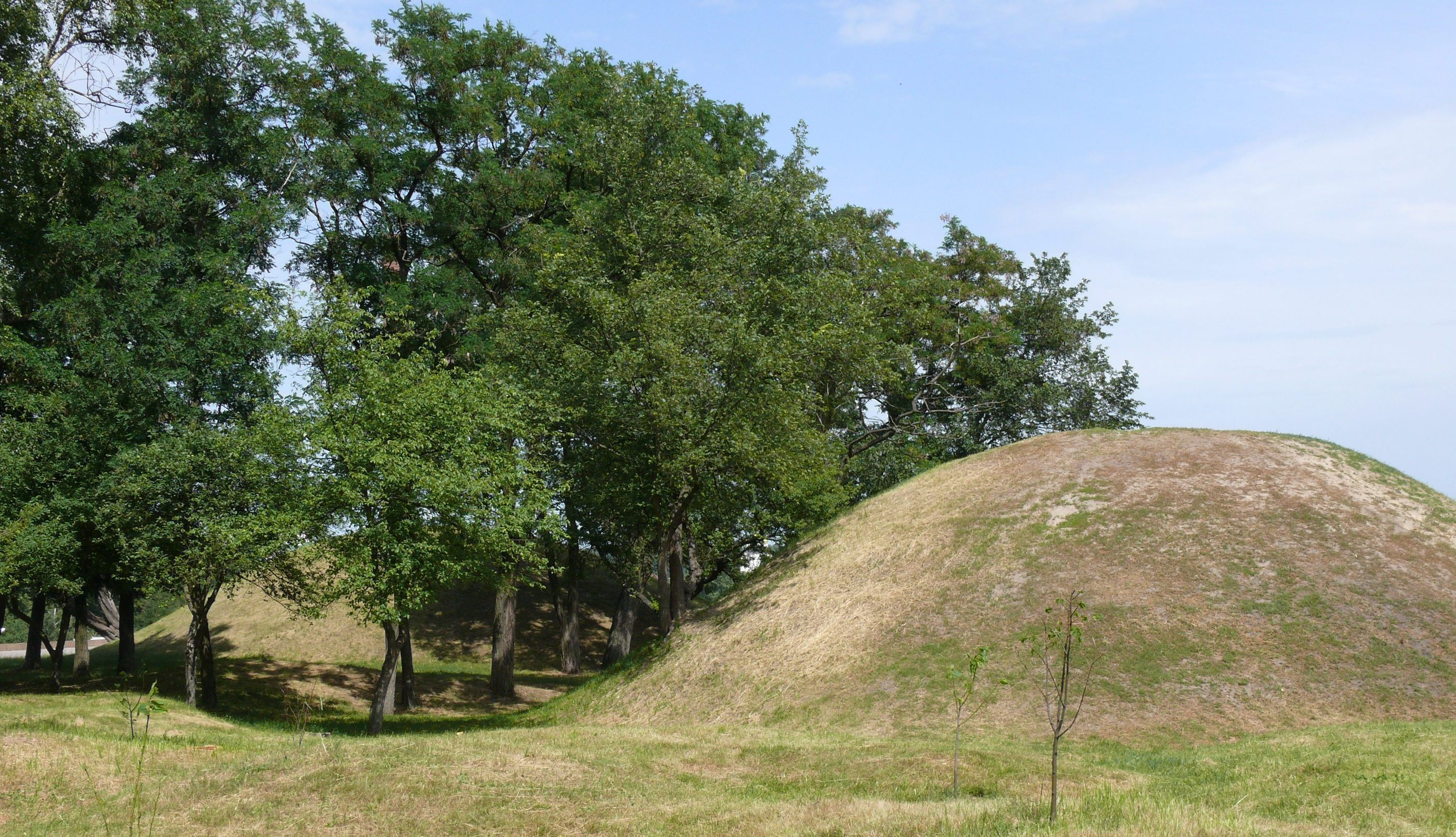
Hulbyshche and Bezimennyi kurgans, Boldyni Hory

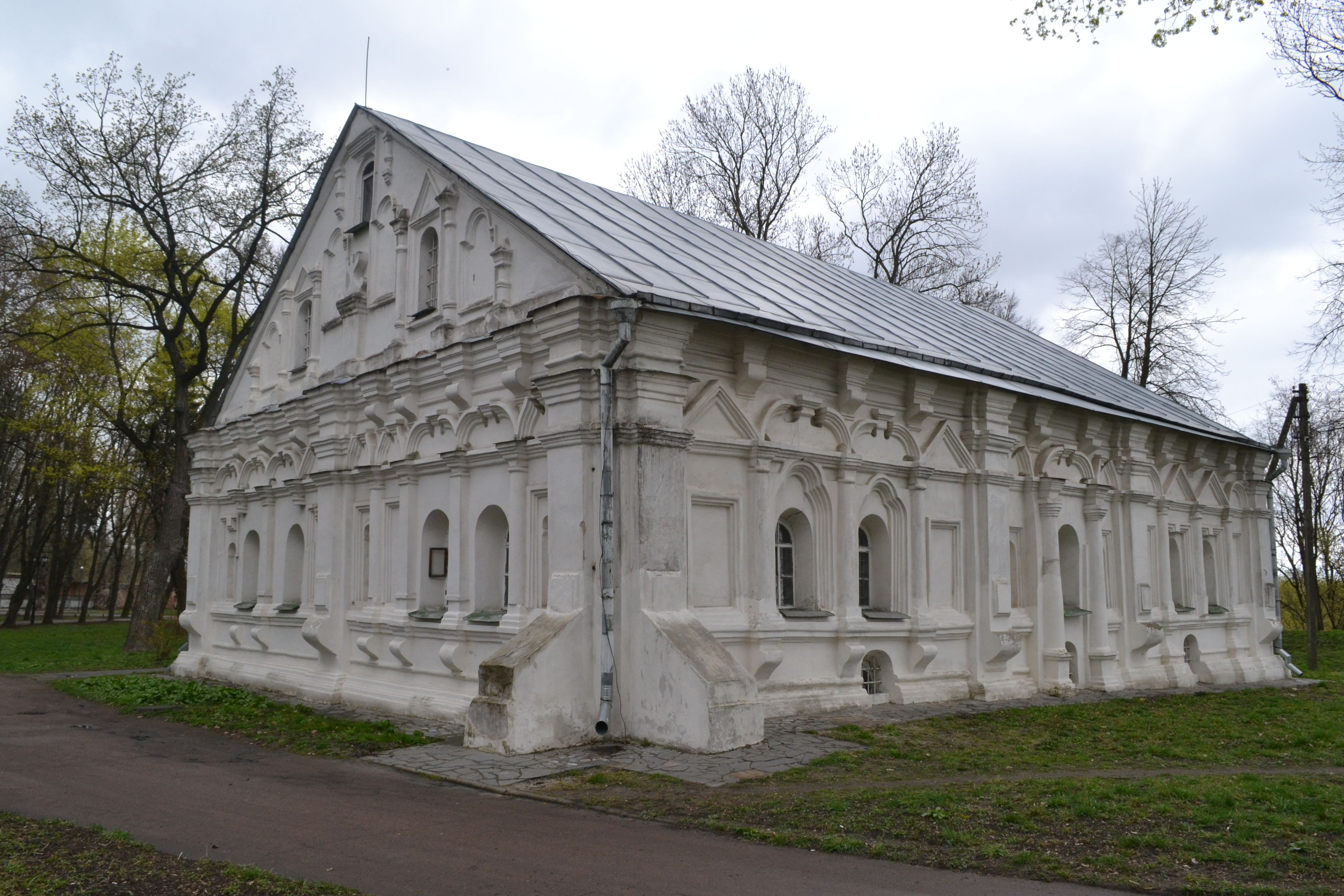
House of Lyzohub

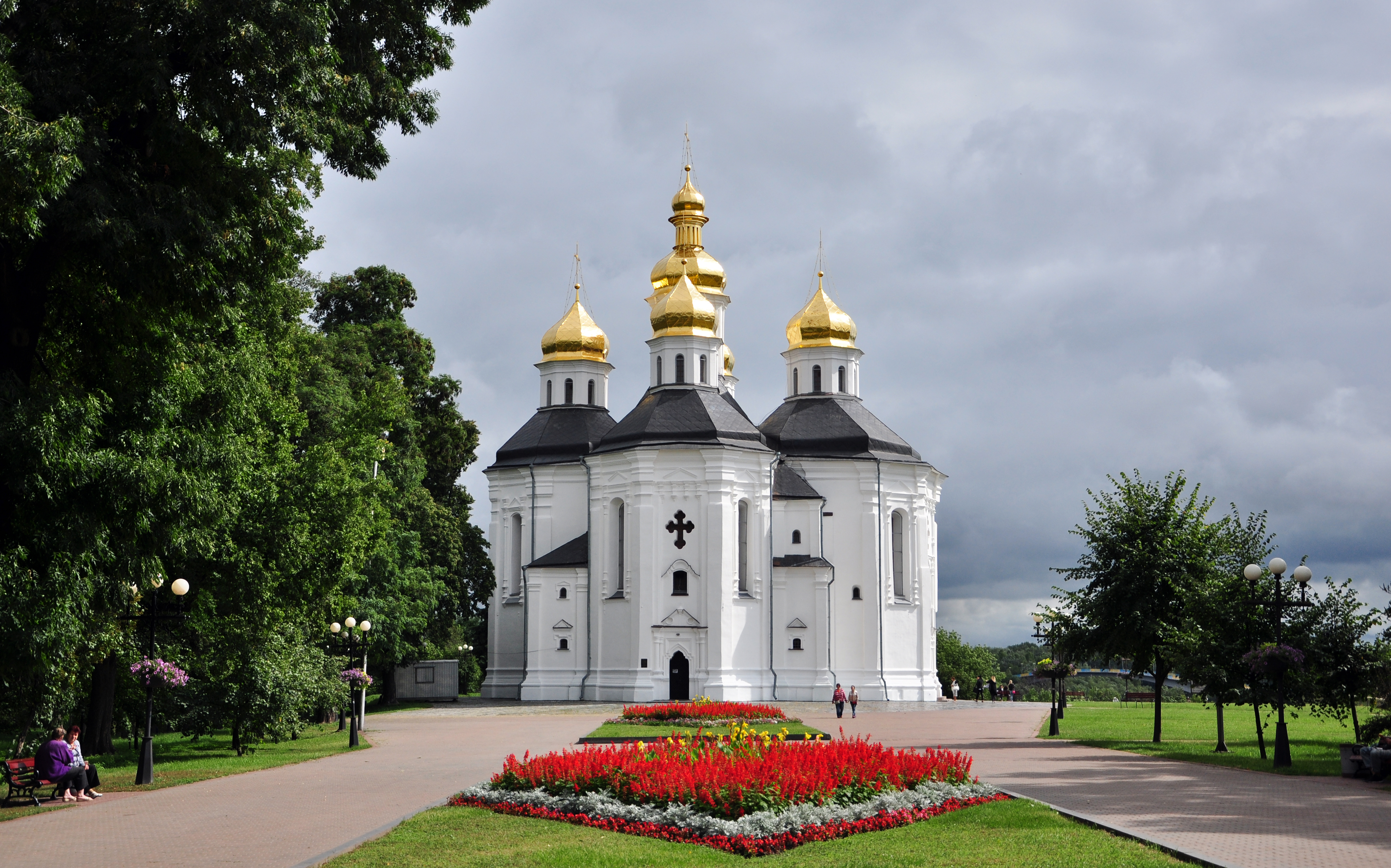
St. Catherine's Church

== See also ==
- List of historic reserves in Ukraine
- List of UNESCO World Heritage Sites in Ukraine
