= Vladimir Beklemishev (sculptor) =

Russian sculptor (1861–1919)

- Владимир Александрович Беклемишев
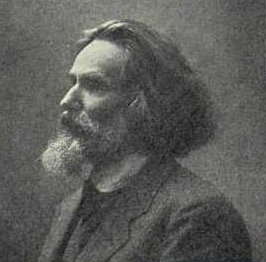
- Born: August 15, 1861; Bakhmut uezd, Yekaterinoslav Governorate
- Died: December 21, 1919 (aged 58); Novorzhev, Pskov Governorate
- Education: Alexander von Bock; Nikolay Laveretsky; Ivan Podozerov
- Alma mater: Imperial Academy of Arts (1887)
- Known for: Sculpture
- Spouse(s): Yekaterina Prokhorova (formerly Gvozdanovich; alias Misheva) (m. 1897; died 1912)
- Children: 3
- Awards: Big Gold Medal of the Imperial Academy of Arts (1887)
- Elected: Member Academy of Arts (1892); Full Member Academy of Arts (1893)

Vladimir Aleksandrovich Beklemishev (Russian: Влади́мир Алекса́ндрович Беклеми́шев; 15 August [O.S. 3 August] 1861 — 21 December 1919) was a Russian sculptor during the Modernist period, a rector of the Imperial Academy of Arts.

== Biography ==
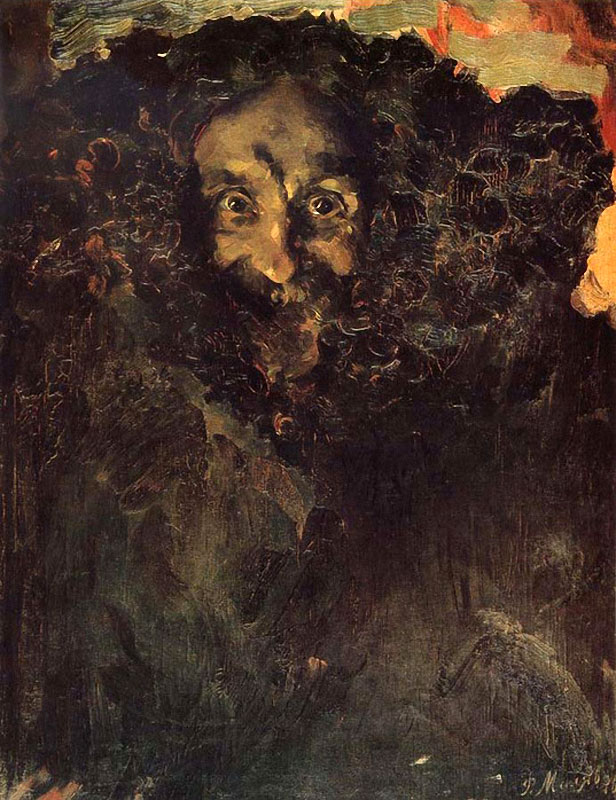
Comic portrait of Vladimir Beklemishev by Filipp Malyavin

Vladimir Beklemishev was born in Yekaterinoslav Governorate in the family estate of his father, retired hussar colonel Aleksander Nikolayevich Beklemishev (1822–1908). Beklemishevs are an old Russian noble family, distant relatives to famous Russian military leaders, Prince Dmitry Pozharsky and Mikhail Kutuzov. Alexander Beklemishev after retirement lived in Rome for many years and even accepted an Italian last name of Redgio. On returning to Russian Empire, Alexander Beklemishev worked as a director and decorator of provincial opera theatres and a watercolour painter.

Soon after the birth of Vladimir the family moved to Kharkov where Vladimir Beklemishev studied in 2nd City Gymnasium. He firstly received his art lessons from his father, then from the local painter Ye. Ye. Shraider and from the Art School of Maria Rayevskaya-Ivanova.

In 1878 Beklemishev moved to Saint Petersburg and started his studies at the Imperial Academy of Arts. He chooses the sculpture class. His teachers were Alexander von Bock and Nikolay Laveretsky. In 1885 Beklemishev already had received three Lesser Silver Medals and one Grand Silver Medal from his Academy. In 1886, he received the Academy's Grand Gold Medal for his sculpture "The Entombment" (Положение в Гроб) that gave him his right for a government stipend to study abroad. In January 1888 he moved to Paris then to Rome. The most remarkable Beklemishev's sculpture of the Rome period is the "Early Christian Woman". She also made his first sculpture portraits then.

In 1892 Beklemishev returned to Russia where for his works made in Rome he received the title of the Academician. The same year he demonstrates his famous sculpture "How Beautiful, How Fresh Were the Roses" named after the story of Ivan Turgenev. In 1894 Beklemishev became a Professor of the Academy. Among his pupils were famous sculptors Vsevolod Lishev, Matvey Manizer. In 1900 Beklemishev became a member of the Academy's Council and in 1906 he became the rector of the Sculpture Department of the Academy.

During that time he chiselled a number of sculpture portraits including the sculptures of physicist Nikolay Beketov, painter Konstantin Makovsky, musicians Mitrofan Belyayev and Vasily Safonov. In 1914 he cut a bust of painter Arkhip Kuindzhi that was set on the artist's grave (now on Tikhvin Cemetery in Saint Petersburg).

He also made large sculptures for monuments in public spaces, including monument to Pyotr Ilyich Tchaikovsky for the Saint Petersburg Conservatory (1897), monument to Alexander Griboyedov for the Russian Embassy in Tehran, Iran; monument to Yermak Timofeyevich in Novocherkassk. In 1908 Beklemishev chiselled monument to doctor Sergey Botkin installed at the entrance to the Imperial Military Medical Academy.

In summer 1917 Beklemishev was a member of the commission preparing the new constitution of the Academy and the head of the Petrograd Department for Protections of Historical and Artistic monuments (уполномоченный отдела охраны памятников старины и искусства в Петрограде). On 6 September 1919 he was arrested by Cheka for his membership in the Constitutional Democratic Party. On 18 September 1919 he was released from the jail, on 1 December 1919 he was forced to move from Petrograd (St. Peterburg) to Novorzhev in Pskov Governorate there he died on 21 December 1919.

== Works ==
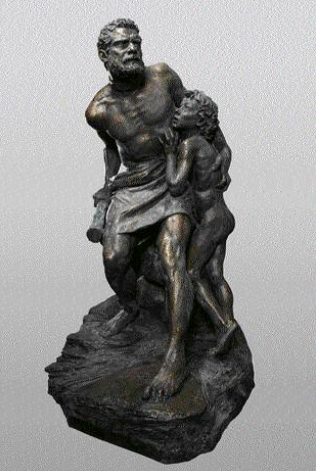
The Runaway Slave, sculpture in gypsum-tinted bronze (1891)

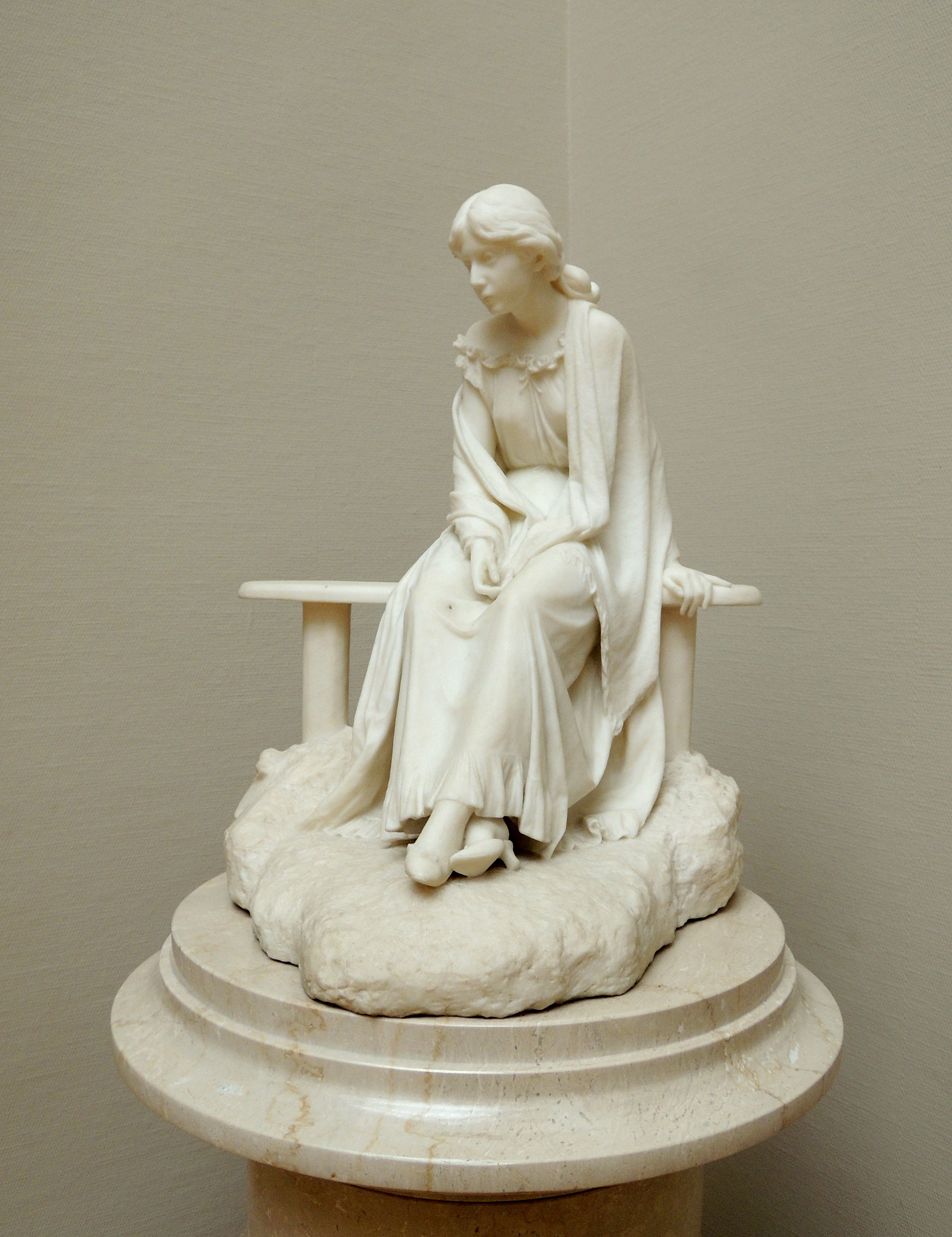
How Beautiful, How Fresh Were the Roses (1896)

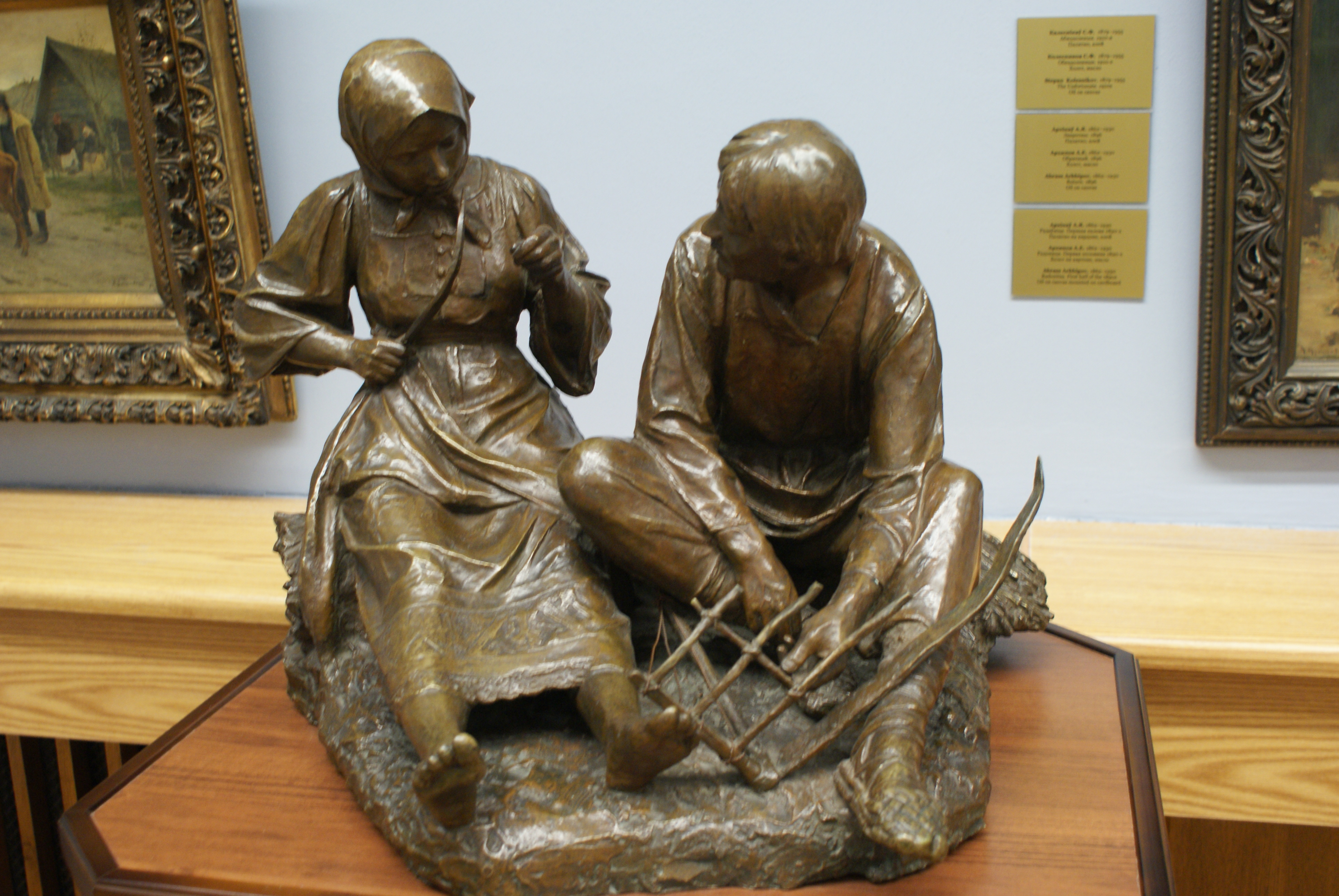
Village love (1896)

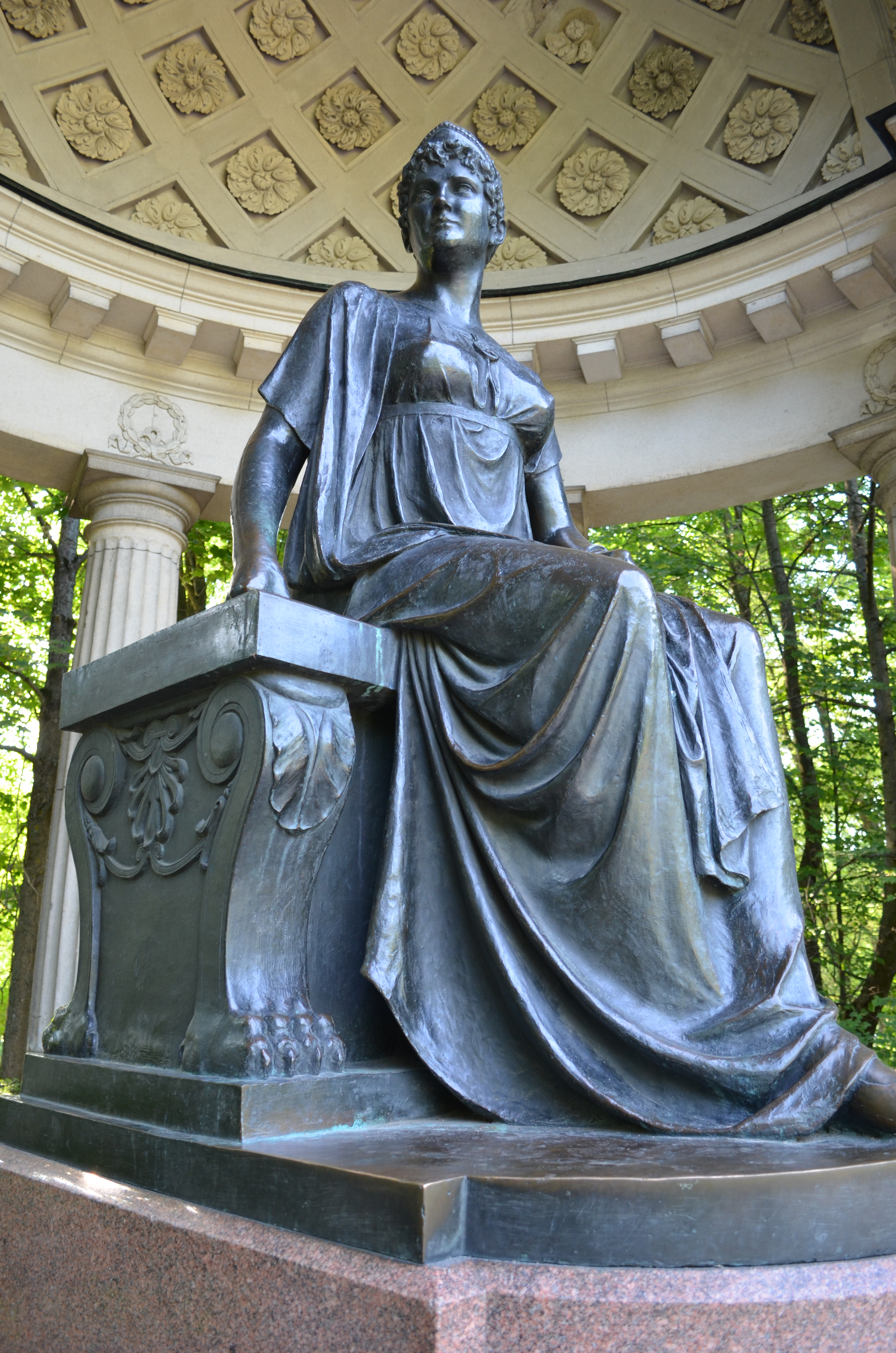
Maria Feodorovna, sculpture set in Rossi Pavilion in Pavlovsk Park (1913)
