= Alexander von Bock =

Baltic German sculptor (1829–1895)

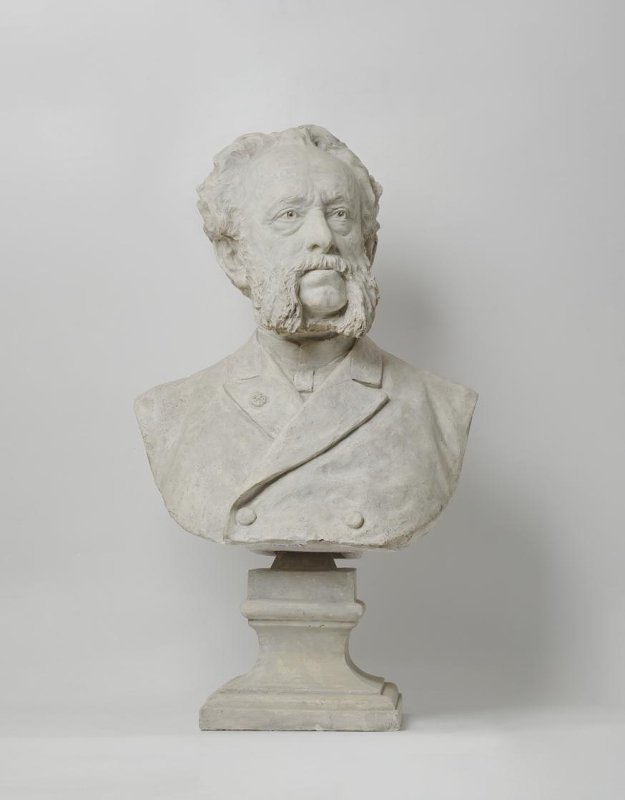
- Portrait bust by Robert Bach, 1895, plaster; Museum of the Academy of Arts, Saint Petersburg
- Born: Alexander Friedrich von Bock; 19 June (O. S. 7 June) 1829; Restfer, Governorate of Estonia
- Died: 29 August (O. S. 17 August) 1895; Saint Petersburg
- Resting place: Smolensk Lutheran Cemetery, St. Petersburg
- Education: Peter Clodt von Jürgensburg = Imperial Academy of Arts (1857)
- Known for: Sculpture
- Notable work: Minerva and the Genii, 1875–1877; Monument to Mikhail Glinka in Smolensk, 1883–1885
- Style: Academism
- Elected: Professor by rank (1864)

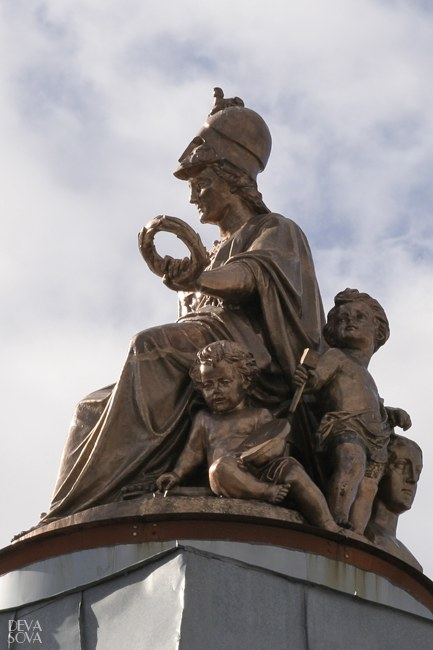
Minerva and the Genii, 2003 reconstruction by Mikhail Anikushin, Vladimir Gorevoy and assistants after the 1870s models by Bock, bronze

Alexander Friedrich von Bock, russified as Aleksandr Romanovich von Bok (Russian: Алекса́ндр Рома́нович фон Бок; 7 June 1829, Reastvere, Estonia (then part of Russian Empire) - 17 August 1895, Saint Petersburg) was a Baltic German sculptor and art professor.

== Biography ==
From 1850 to 1857, he studied at the Imperial Academy of Arts, where his primary instructor was Peter Clodt. During his time there, he received several awards. Upon graduating, he was presented with a large gold medal for his bas-relief depicting the crucifixion of Jesus. He was also named an "Artist First-Class". The following year, he was given a stipend to study abroad. From then until 1864, he spent time in Germany, France and Italy.

Upon returning, he was named "Professor of Sculpture", for the figures of Psyche and Cupid that he created while in Rome. Both works were purchased by Tsar Alexander II, and placed in the Hermitage. The following year, he was elected a member of the faculty in the sculpture department at the academy; in 1883, he was promoted to first-degree professor in 1883. He taught at the academy, and was a member of its governing council, until his final years; due to his declining health and amidst the academical reform, Bock retired from the Imperial Academy in July 1894. Bock's most notable pupils were Vladimir Beklemishev and Hugo Salemann who, albeit arguing with their master, eventually succeeded him at the reformed Academy; his students also included Robert Bach and Maria Dillon, as well as the pioneering Estonian sculptors, Amandus Adamson and August Weizenberg. Ilya Gintsburg and Leonid Sherwood, sometimes written as Bock's students, never considered themselves as such, however.

In 1880, he offered several of his works to the academy's museum, including the cast for a colossal bust of Catherine the Great.

One of his best known works was a tinned plaster figure of Minerva, surrounded by young genii, representing the various arts. Designed for the academy's dome, it was installed there in 1885. It was demolished following a fire only fifteen years later. The original models were preserved, and it was restored as bronze in 2003.
