= Yekaterinburg Museum of Fine Arts =

Art museum in Yekaterinburg, Russia

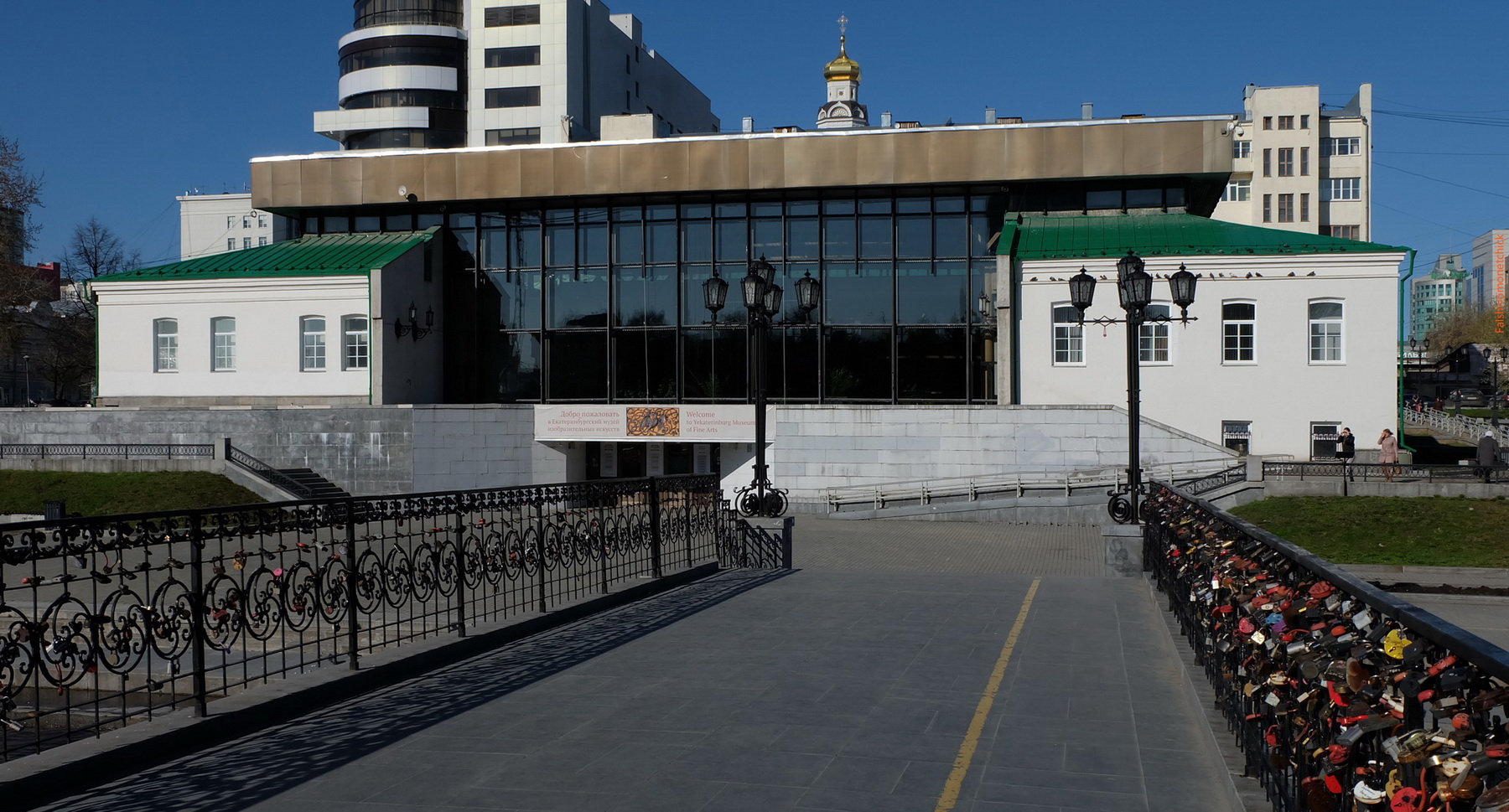
- Former name: Sverdlovsk Art Gallery
- Established: 1936; 90 years ago
- Location: Voevodina Street, Yekaterinburg
- Coordinates: 56°50′6.46″N 60°36′11.65″E
- Type: Art museum
- Collection size: over 18 000
- Website: i-z-o.art/en/

The Yekaterinburg Museum of Fine Arts, established in 1986, is the largest art museum of the Urals region of Russia. It is based in Voevodina Street on the banks of the Iset River in the city of Yekaterinburg (known as Sverdlovsk between 1924 and 1991 and the fourth largest city in Russia).

At the heart of the museum building is one of the oldest buildings in Yekaterinburg, a hospital built in 1730 for the Yekaterinburg Ironworks. The building was modified several times during the 19th century. In the 1970s, most of the buildings of the former ironworks were demolished and the Historical Square laid out in their place. At the end of the 1970s, the idea of converting the remainder into a museum space was suggested. The project was completed in 1986.

== History ==
The art gallery, then known as the Sverdlovsk Art Gallery, was originally established in a second building in Weiner Street in 1936. Here collections of works of the Russian artistic avant-garde of the 1910–1920s, Russian art of the 1920–1950s, and the later period - the 1960s to the present day, were exhibited. During the Second World War the collection of the Hermitage Museum were transferred there for safety.

In the mid-1980s much of the art collection was rehoused in the newly rebuilt Voevodina Street building. It was granted the status of a Museum of Fine Arts in 1988 and renamed the Yekaterinburg Museum of Fine Arts in 1992 after the city of Sverdlovsk was itself renamed.

In 2015 a well-known collector, the Head of Yekaterinburg, Yevgeny Roizman donated his collection of naive art to the museum, thereby initiating the organization of a new building - Museum of Naive Art. The museum at st. Rosa Luxembourg, 18 was opened on the historic birthday of Yekaterinburg on November 18, 2017. The building of the Museum of Naive Art was built in 1884 by the architect A.I. Paduchev and has the status of a monument of local importance. In Soviet times, the house was residential, it housed communal apartments, in the post-Soviet years the mansion housed a recording studio, where the legendary rock bands Chaif and Nautilus Pompilius recorded their albums.

== Buildings ==
The Yekaterinburg Museum of Fine Arts is the largest art museum of the Urals, it has four buildings:

- Pavilion of Russian art - Voevodina street, 5
- "Hermitage-Ural" cultural and exhibition center - Weiner Street, 11
- Museum of Naive Art - Rosa Luxembourg street, 18
- Center for the History of Stone-cutting named after A.K. Denisov-Uralsky - Pushkin street, 5

== Collections ==
The museum is known primarily for the unique collection of Kasli art casting and the world famous Kasli cast-iron pavilion - a participant in the 1900 Paris World Exhibition.

- Russian painting of the 18th-early 20th centuries, including canvases by Ivan Shishkin, Ivan Kramskoi, Alexei Savrasov, Vasily Polenov, K.A. Korovin and others.
- Russian avant-garde 1910-1920, including works by Kazimir Malevich, Wassily Kandinsky, Mikhail Larionov, Natalia Goncharova, Ilya Mashkov, Pyotr Konchalovsky and others
- Domestic painting and graphics of the XX - early XXI centuries
- Russian porcelain and glass of the 18th - 20th centuries
- Russian icon painting of the 16th-19th centuries, including the collection of the so-called "Nevyansk icon"
- Russian naive art of the XX - XXI centuries (mainly donated by mayor of the city Yevgeny Roizman)
- Western European art of the XIV-XIX centuries
- Western European porcelain and glass
- Tobolsk carved bone
- Ural art cast iron casting
- Stone-cutting and jewelry art of the Urals
- Nizhny Tagil painted tray
- Zlatoust decorated weapon and engraving on steel

== Gallery ==
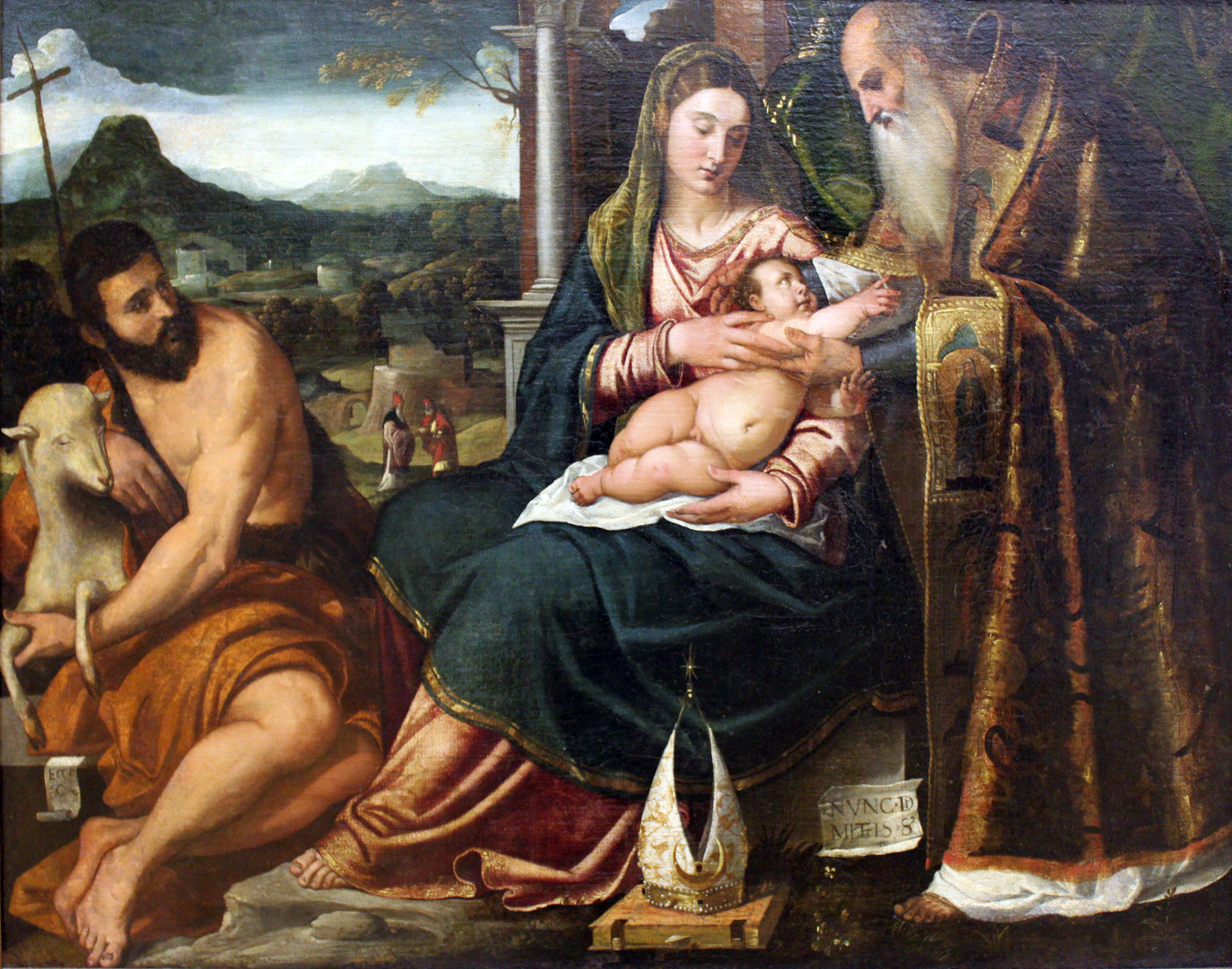
Polidoro Lanzani,
"Holy Conversation", 1555

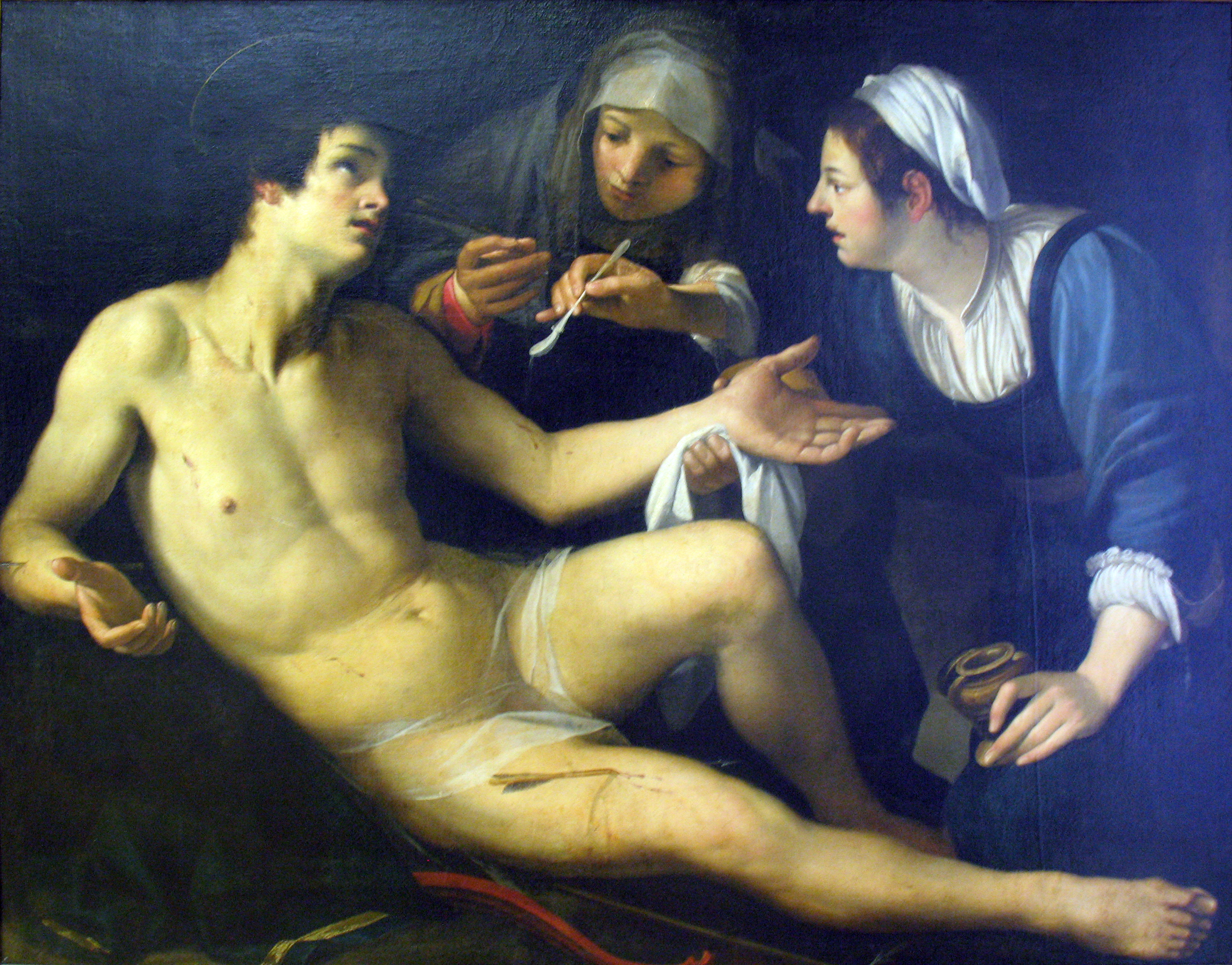
Francesco Rustici, "Saint Sebastian", (first half of the 1620s)

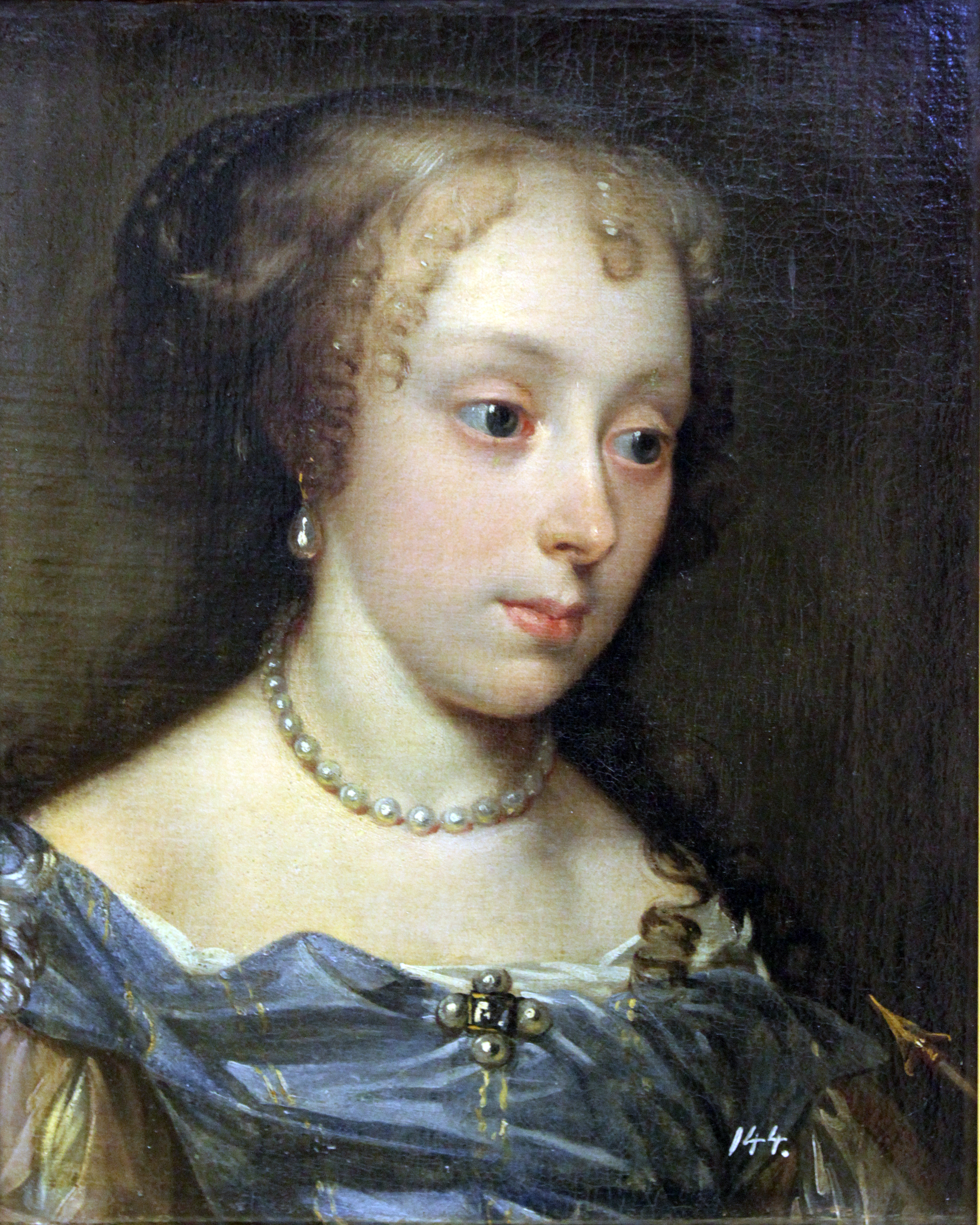
Peter Lely,
Portrait of a Woman, 1670

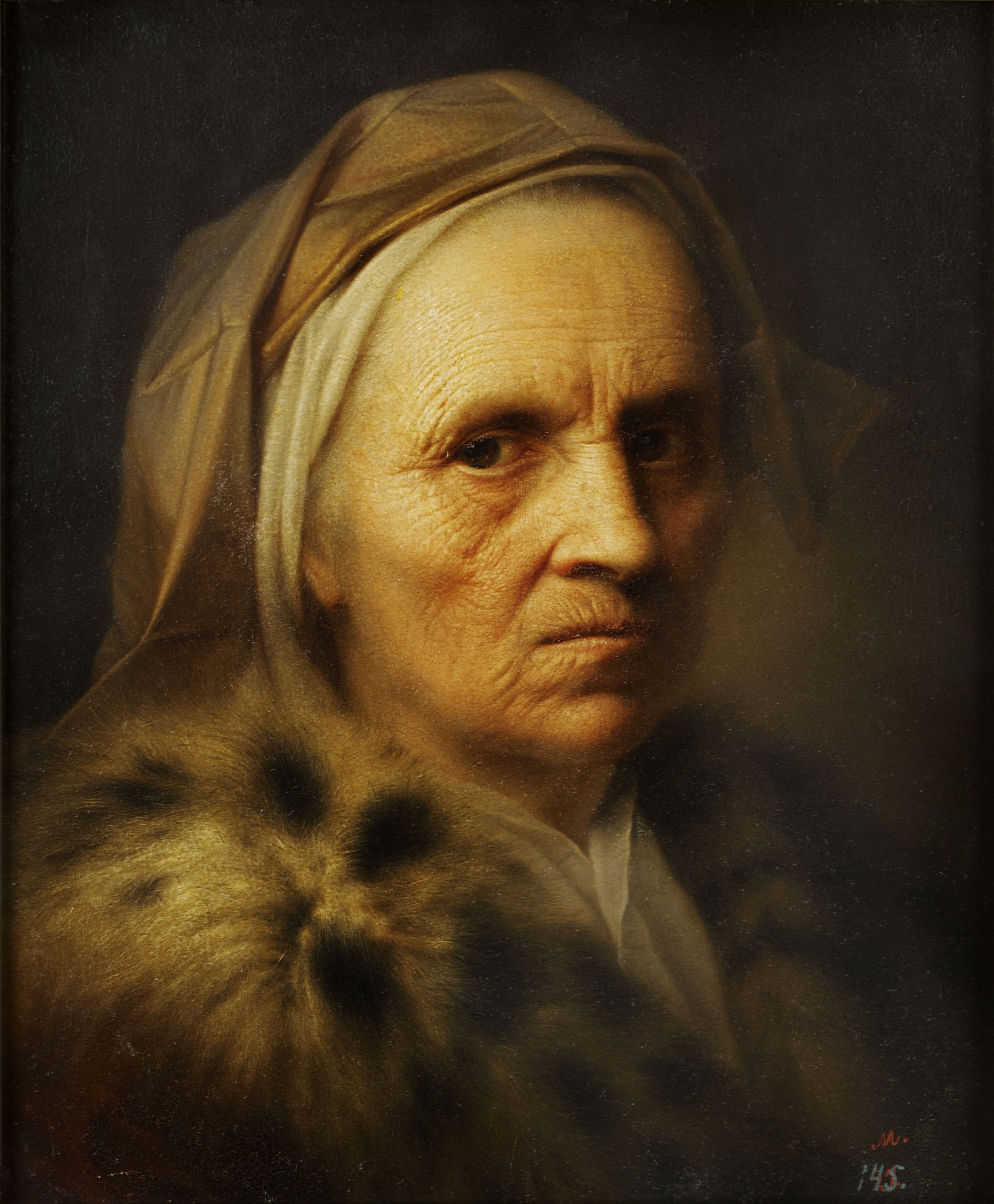
Balthasar Denner,
"Portrait of an Old Woman", 1725

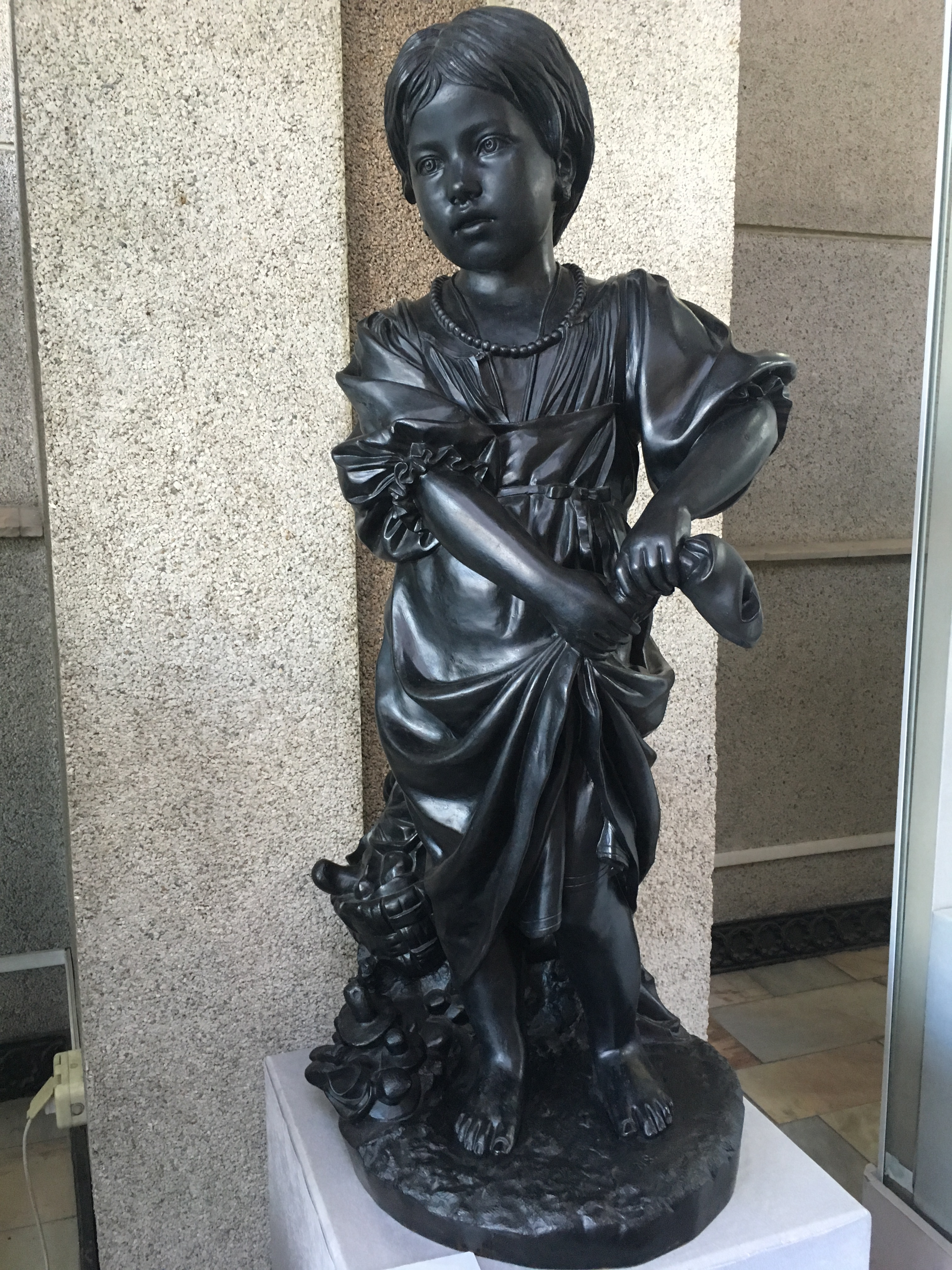
Girl mushroom. Kasli casting. Based on a plaster model from 1871.

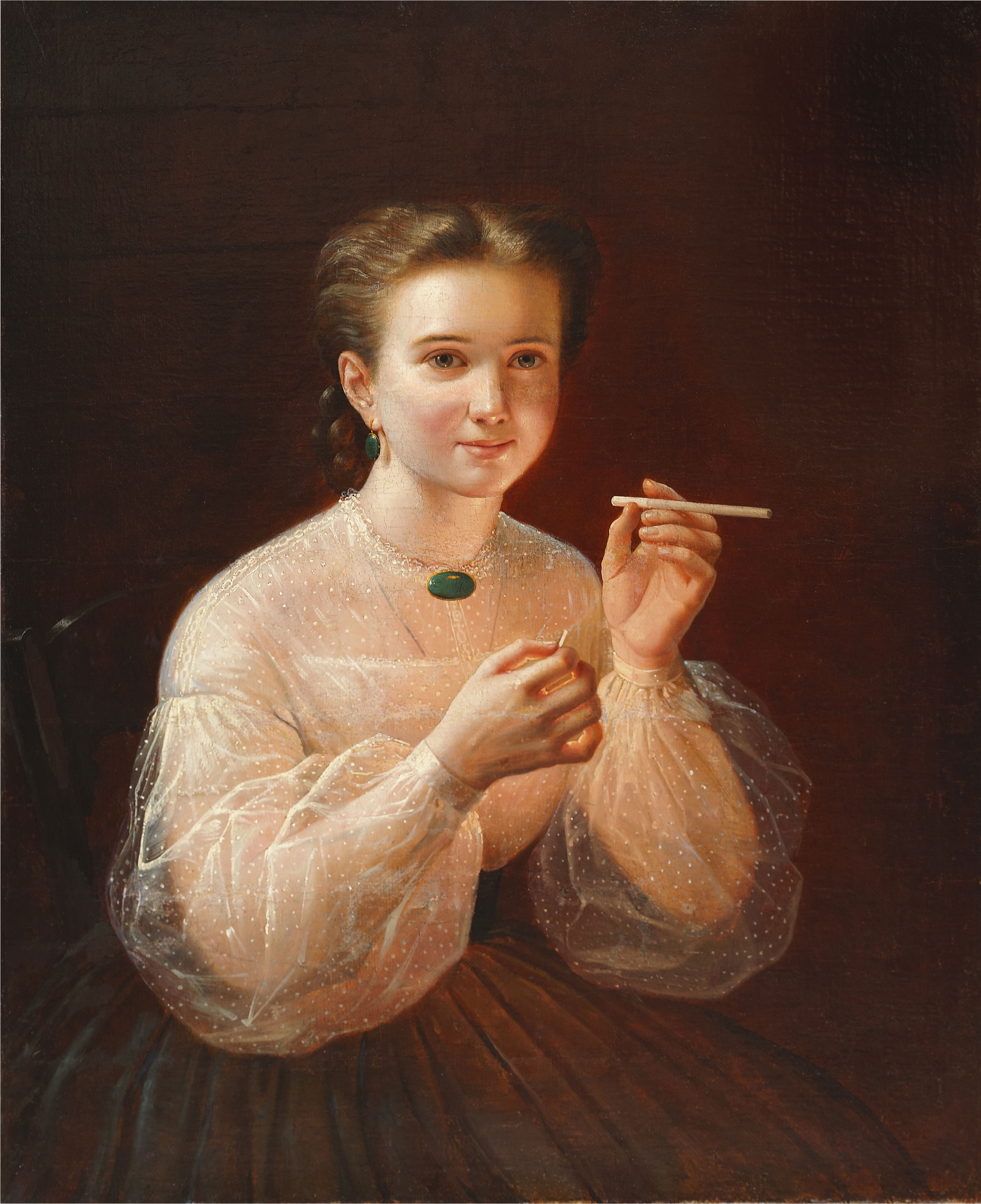
Pyotr Zabolotsky, "Girl with a cigarette", 1830s

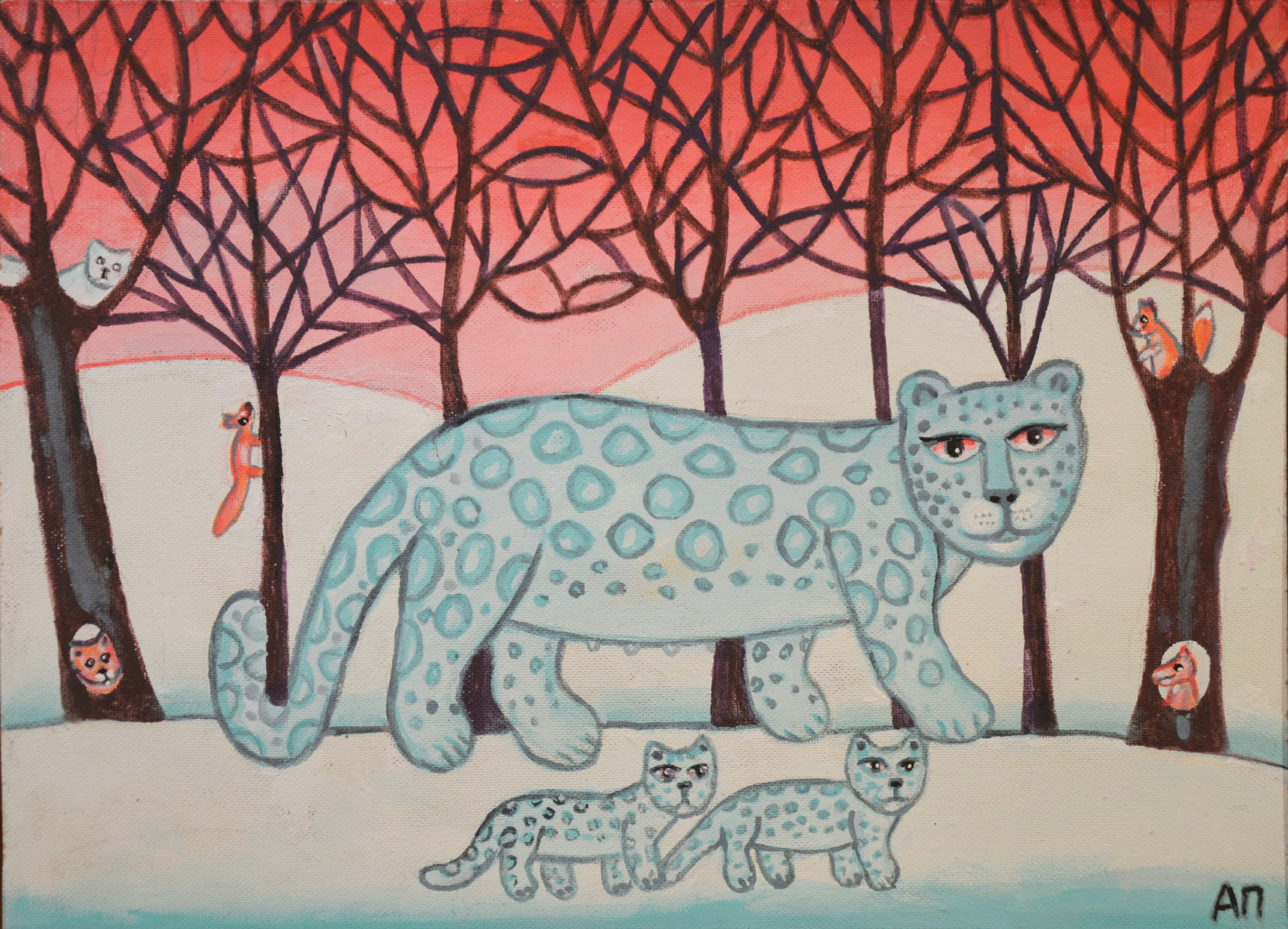
Alevtina Pyzhova "Snow Leopard". 2013. Oil on board. 50х68 cm.
