= The Runaway Slave =

Sculpture

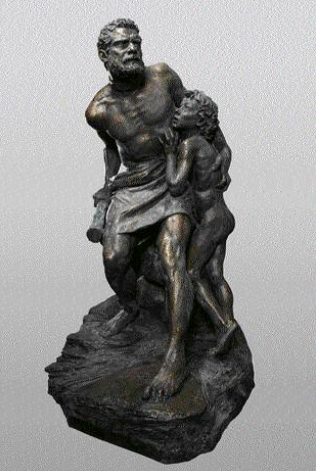
- Artist: Vladimir Aleksandrovich Beklemishev
- Year: 1891
- Medium: Sculpture
- Subject: Slavery
- Location: Hermitage Museum, St. Petersburg

The Runaway Slave (Russian: Беглый раб) is a sculpture in gypsum-tinted bronze by Vladimir Aleksandrovich Beklemishev, produced in Italy in 1891.

It is thought to have been created after the publication of Uncle Tom's Cabin. It was first exhibited at the Imperial Academy of Arts in 1892, where it acted as Beklemishev's academy piece. It represented Russian art at the 1893 World's Fair in Chicago, which marked the 400th anniversary of Columbus' arrival in America.

It then returned to the Academy of Arts, but remained the artist's property until 1918, when he donated it to the Academy's museum. It was moved to the State Museum of the Revolution in 1930 and after 1945 was assigned its own building, M. F. Kshesinskaya's town house (rus.). However, it was lost soon afterwards and remained lost until 2010.
