= Fyodor Buchholz =

Russian painter

Fyodor Fyodorovich Buchholz
- Федор Федорович Бухгольц
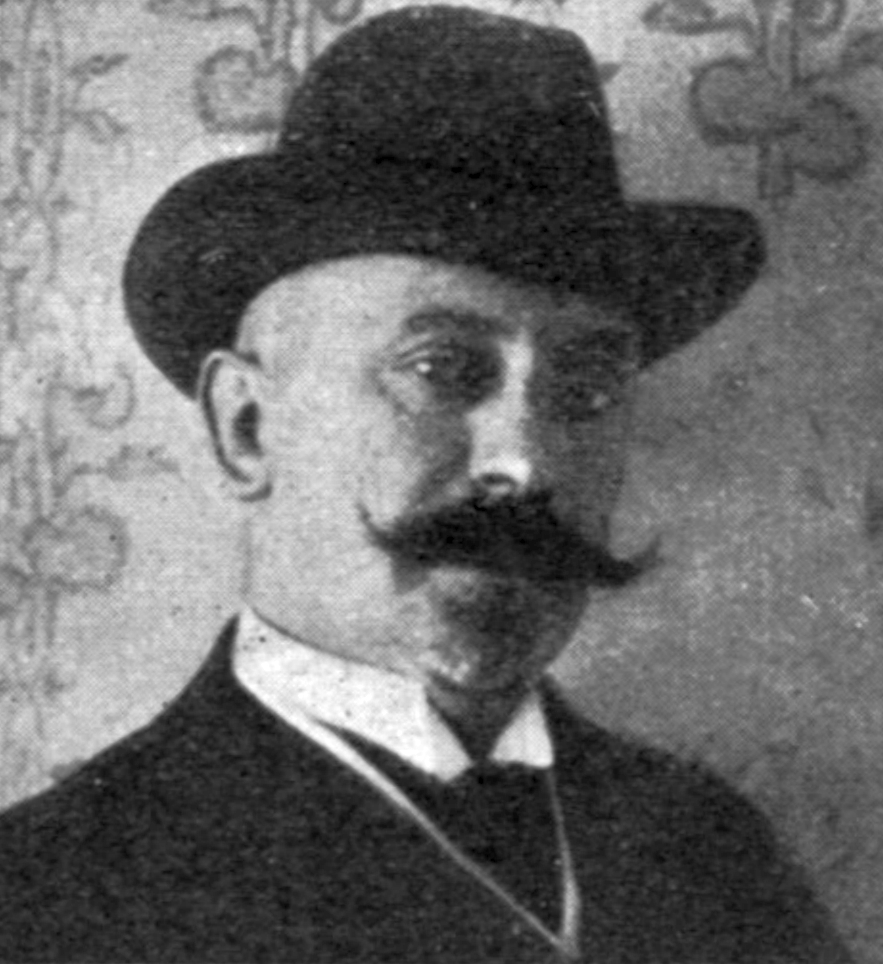
- Born: Teodor Buchholz; 9 June 1857; Włocławek, Russian Empire
- Died: 7 May 1942; Leningrad, USSR
- Resting place: Smolensky Lutheran Cemetery, St. Petersburg
- Education: Imperial Academy of Arts (1886)
- Known for: Genre painting
- Spouse: Maria Dillon

Fyodor Fyodorovich Buchholz (Russian: Фёдор Фёдорович Бухгольц), born Teodor Buchholz (9 June 1857 — 7 May 1942) was a Russo-German painter and draughtsman in the Academical style, usually known for his genre pictures. A second-rate master who's been active in St. Petersburg from Tsar Alexander III's reign through World War II, Buchholz was among founding members of the Kuindzhi Society in 1909.

== Biography ==
Teodor Alexander Ferdinand Buchholz was born in Włocławek, to Eleonora (née Fothke) and Teodor Gustaw Buchholz, who owned a printing press. After graduating from the realschule in his hometown, he enrolled at the Imperial Academy of Fine Arts in St. Petersburg, where, between 1878 and 1886, he studied under the guidance of Pavel Chistyakov and Valery Jacobi. Later, for a long time, Teodor himself lectured at the Imperial Academy of Arts in St. Petersburg. From 1880 to 1882, he was awarded three silver medals. In 1885, he was presented with a gold medal and the title of "Artist" for his rendering of Daedalus and Icarus. After 1888, he participated in the Academy's exhibitions as well as those of the "Society of Russian Watercolorists".

While he was still a student, he began working as a graphic artist: providing illustrations for Niva, Sevyer (North, a literary magazine) and Homeland (a scientific/historical journal). In 1891, he joined the "Association of Russian Illustrators". From 1893 to 1919, he was a teacher at the Imperial Society for the Encouragement of the Arts. In 1902, he won the competition to design the Saint Petersburg Bicentenary medal. He mainly created battle, landscape and generic paintings, in the Art Nouveau style. He put most of his paintings up for display in St. Petersburg, while also having a display at the Zachęta National Gallery of Art in Warsaw.

After the Revolution, he was involved in the creation of agitprop and helped design the celebrations for revolutionary holidays. In 1918, he developed sketches for the anniversary celebrations in Petrograd (Saint Petersburg), which included a triumphal arch on Vasilyevsky Island. In 1924, he became a member of the Association of Artists of Revolutionary Russia and, from 1932, was with the Union of Russian Artists. Between 1919 and 1932, he taught at various secondary schools and Houses of Culture. His wife was Russia's first female sculptor, Maria Dillon. He died during the Siege of Leningrad and was buried at the Smolensky Lutheran Cemetery.

== Selected works ==
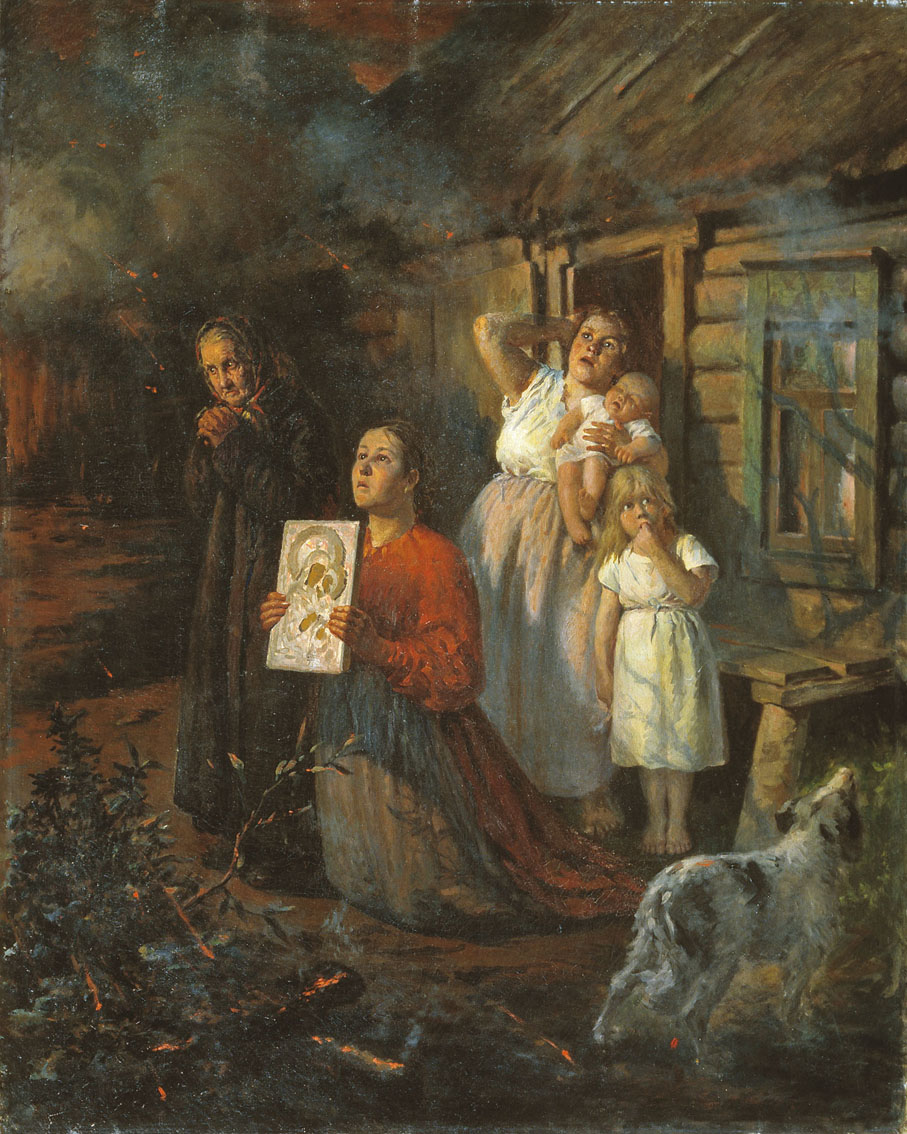
Village Fire
(1901)

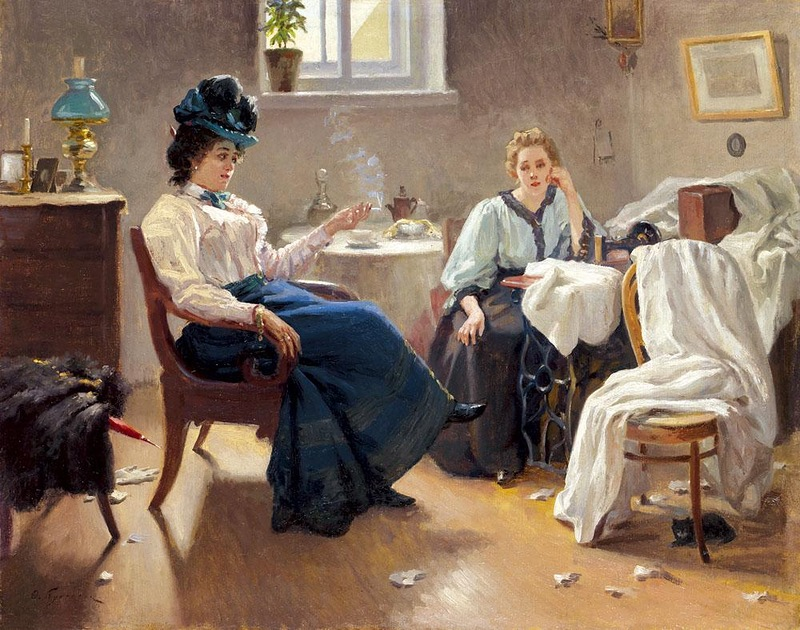
Ladyfriends
(1902)

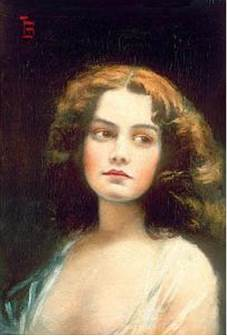
Woman
(1920s)

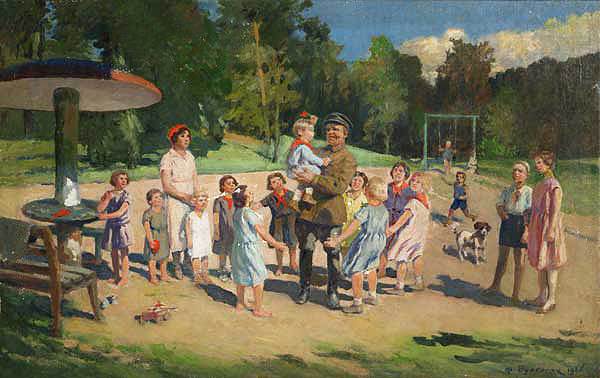
Kirov amongst children
(early 1930s)
