= Kasli iron sculpture =

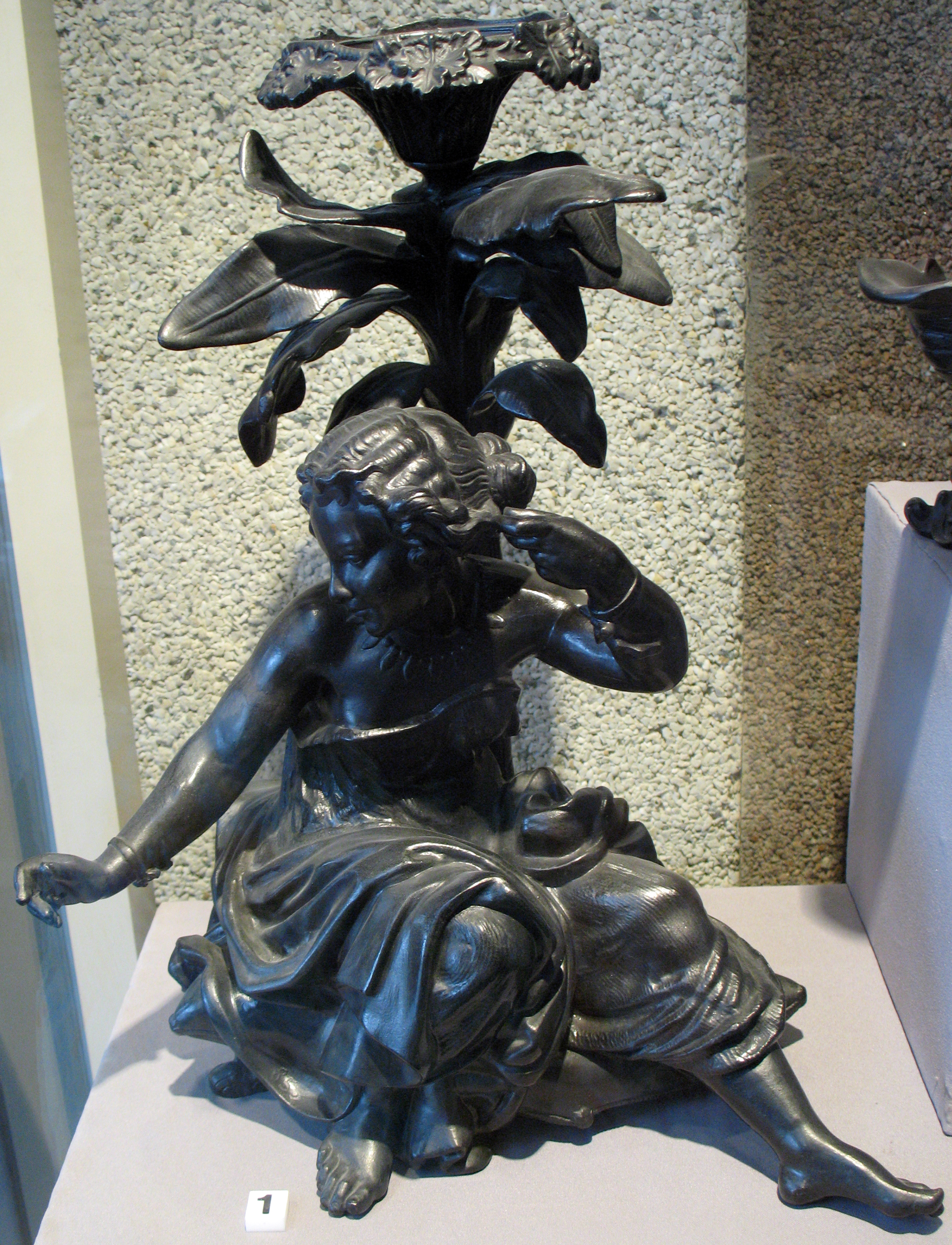
S. A. Ossovskaya: "Caucasian captive"

Kasli cast-iron sculpture was produced in Kasli (Southern Ural), from the mid-19th century. A large collection, including an elaborate pavilion from the 1900 Paris World Fair, is displayed in the Yekaterinburg Museum of Fine Arts. There is also a Kasli Museum of Iron Sculptures. In 1860, the Kasli foundry was honoured with the Gold Award of the Free Economic Society. The following year, it was awarded a Silver Medal at the Saint Petersburg Textile Exhibition. There followed diplomas, silver and gold medals from international exhibitions in Paris (1867), Vienna (1873), Philadelphia (1876), Copenhagen (1888), Stockholm (1897) and Paris (1900).

== Technical expertise ==
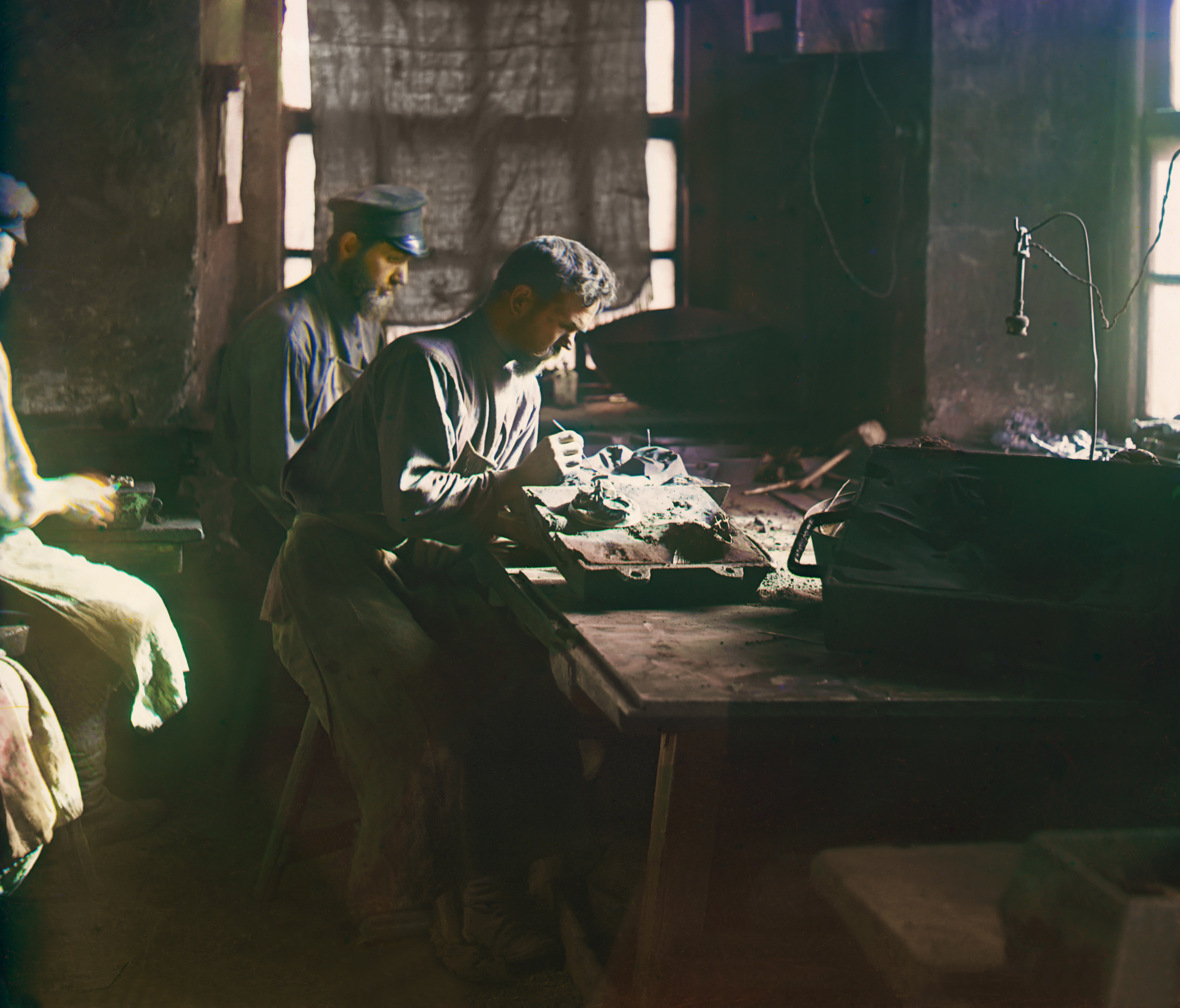
Moulding an artistic casting in the Kasli Iron Works

Kasli castings are characterised by skilled craftsmanship visible in exceptional clarity and smoothness of the metal surface. High-quality iron was smelted on a wood fire and cast in consistently fine sand.

== Original works ==
Many notable sculptures and décor in Moscow and Saint Petersburg, including iron furniture at the Winter Palace, were produced at the Kasli factory. The Yekaterinburg Museum of Fine Arts holds a collection of original sculptures by Vasily Fedorovich Torokin and others.

== Reproductions ==
Some of the best examples are modelled on originals by well-known Russian and European sculptors including Peter Clodt von Jürgensburg and Eugene Lanceray.

== Gallery ==
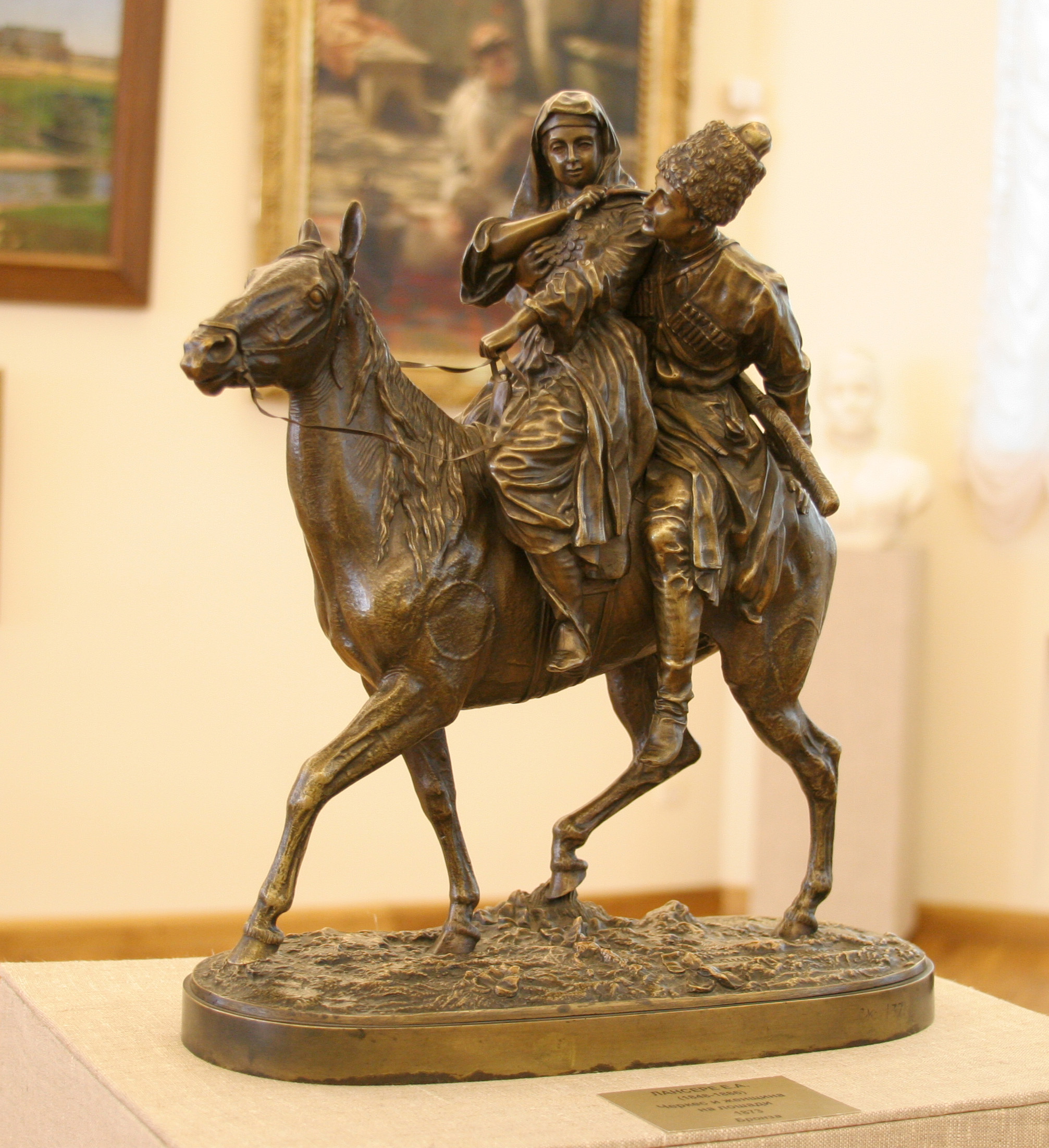
Eugene Lanceray: Soldier with girl

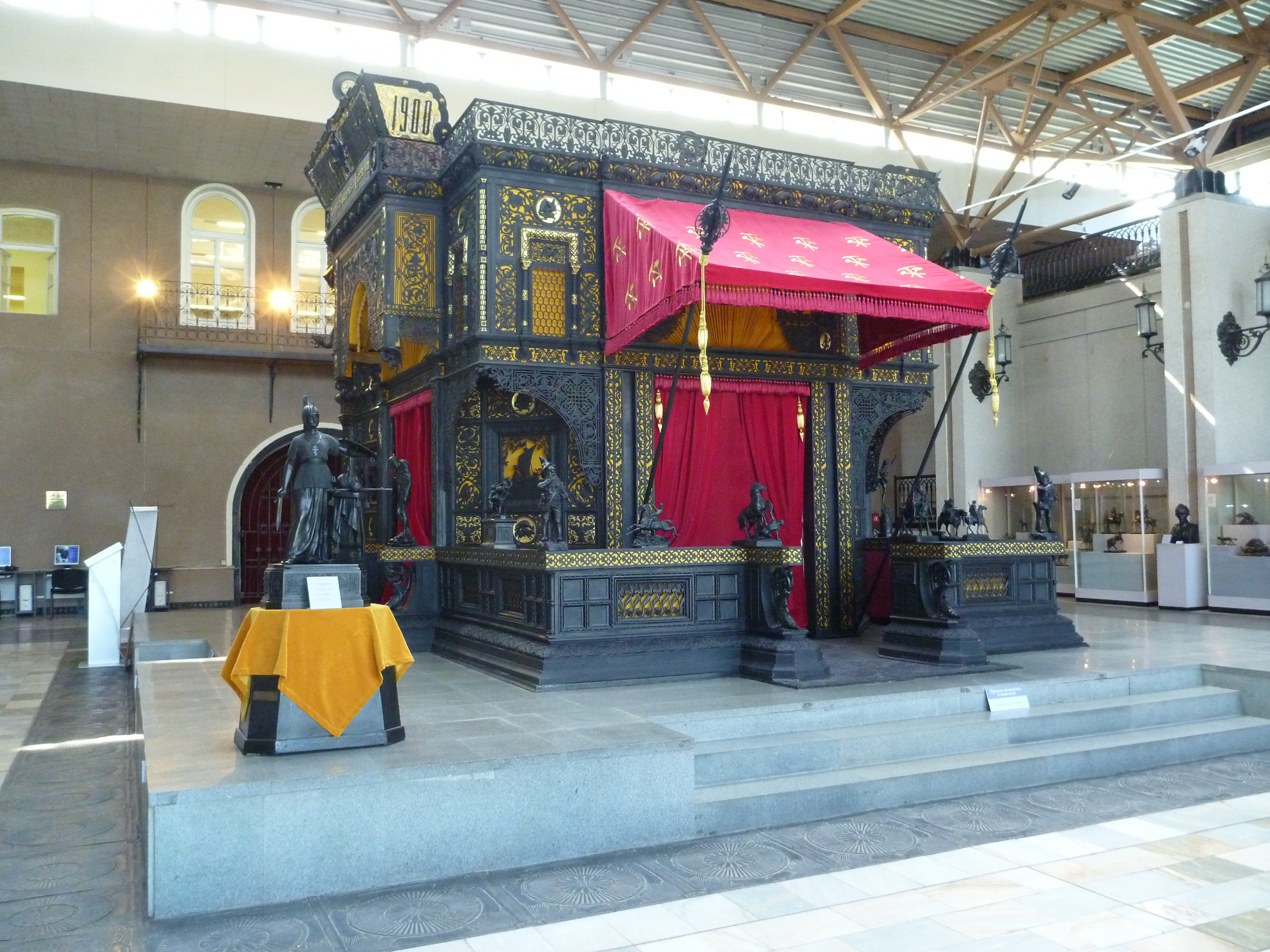
Cast-iron pavilion from 1900 Paris Exposition

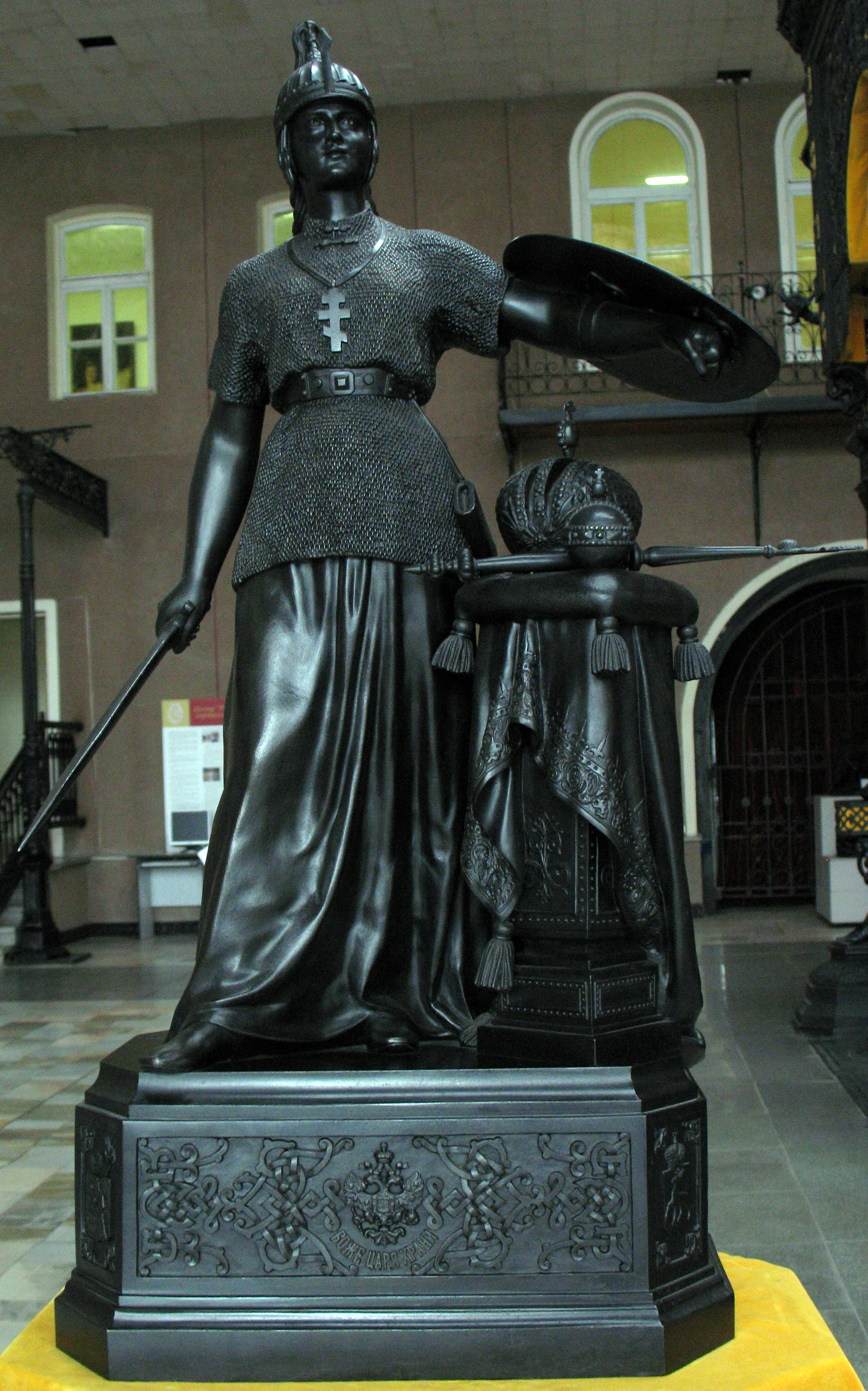
Nikolay Laveretsky: "Russia" (1896)
