= Reastvere =

Village in Estonia

- Village
- Location in Estonia
- Coordinates: 58°53′13″N 26°33′12″E
- Country: Estonia
- County: Jõgeva County
- Municipality: Jõgeva Parish

Population (January 1, 2011)
  - Total: 47

Reastvere is a village in Jõgeva Parish, Jõgeva County in Estonia. Reastvere has a population of 47 (as of 1 January 2011).

Reastvere is located about 3 km (2 mi) northwest of Sadala. The Pedja River flows through Reastvere.

Reastvere was first mentioned as Restfer in 1408.

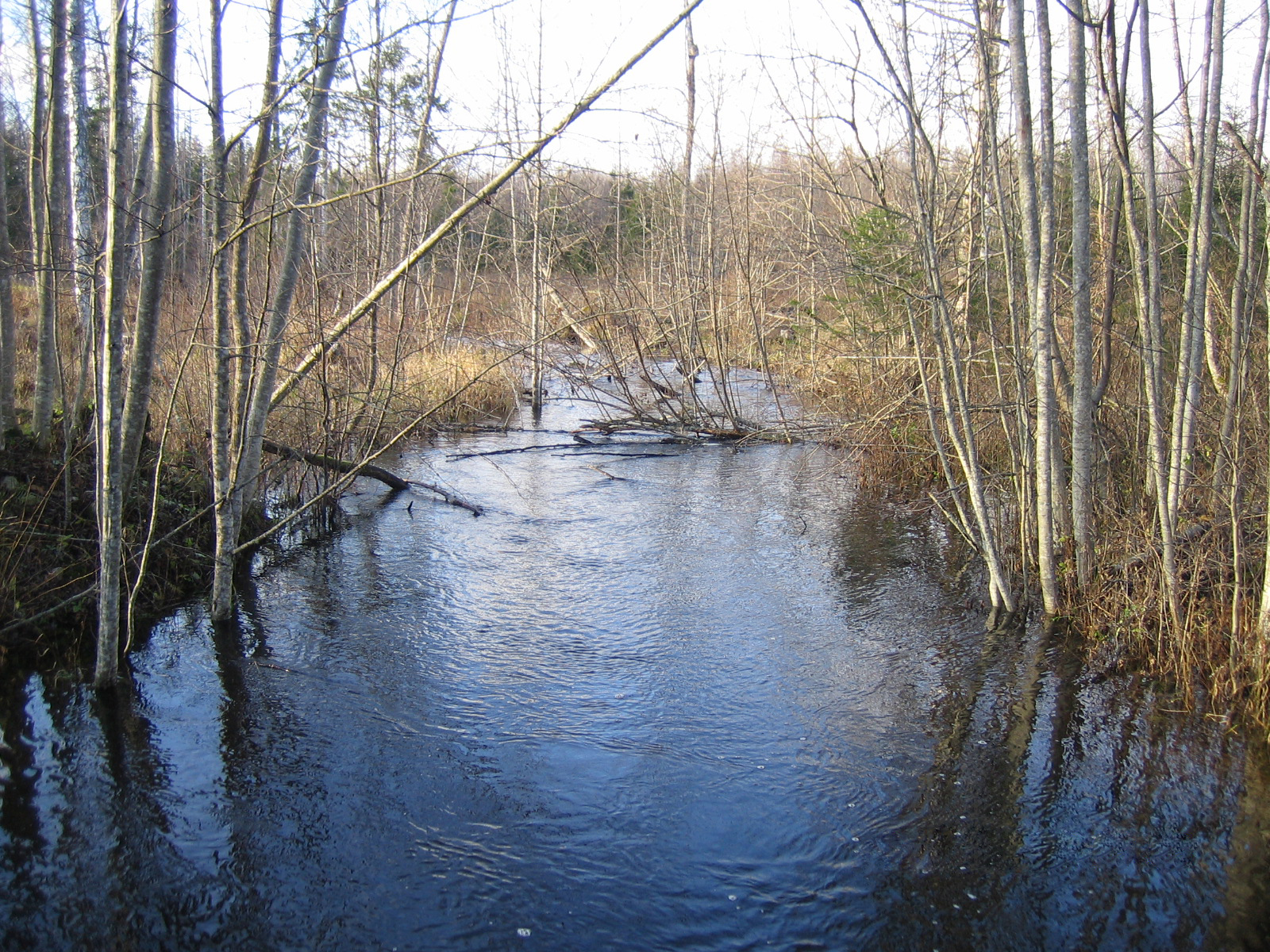
The Salla River about 1 km before its confluence with the Pedja River in Reastvere
