= Pyotr Zabolotsky =

Russian painter (1803–1866)

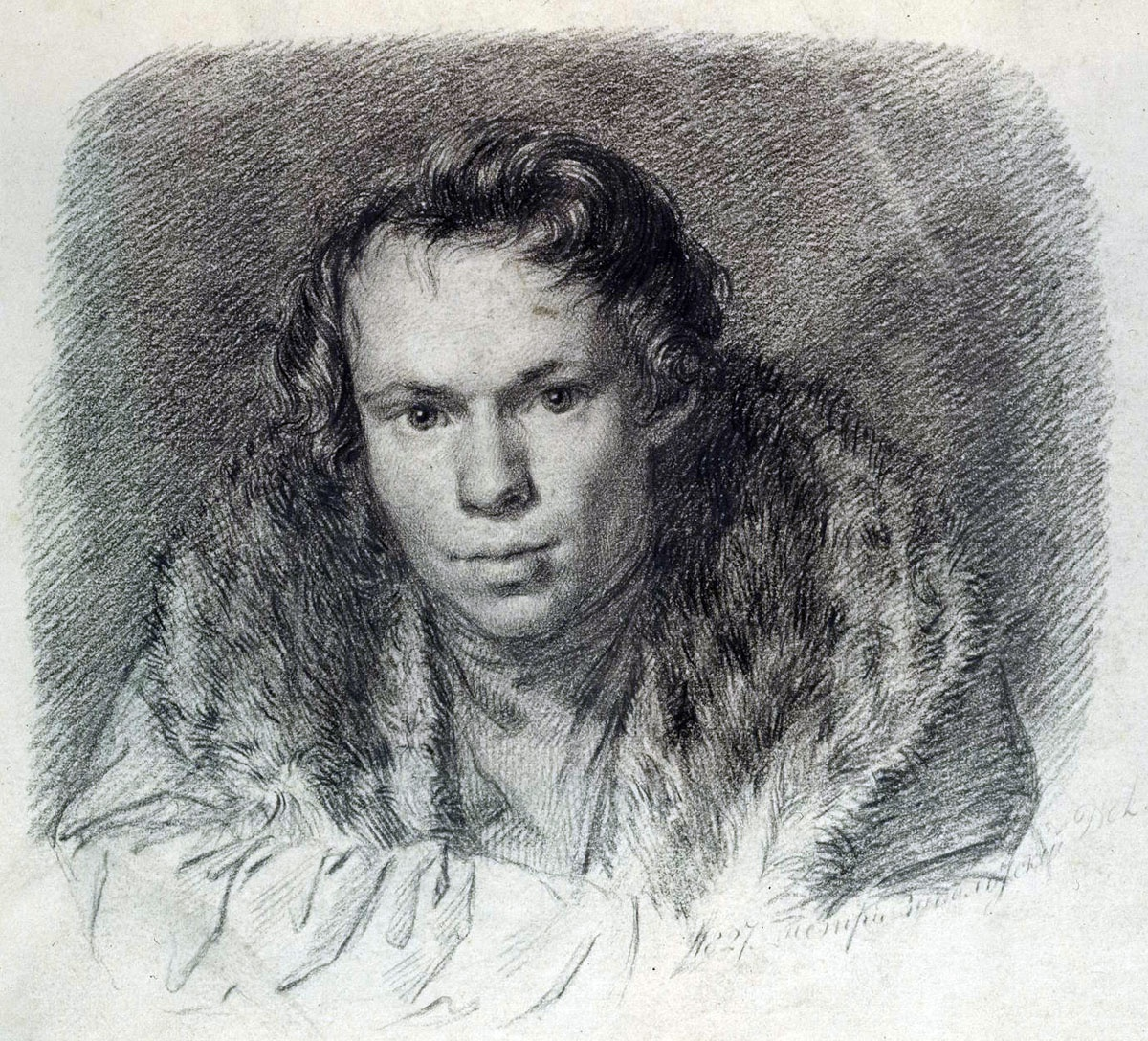
- Self-portrait, c. 1827
- Born: 1803; Tikhvin, Novgorod Governorate, Russian Empire
- Died: 12 March 1866 (aged 62–63)
- Children: Pyotr Petrovich Zabolotsky (born 1842)

Pyotr Yefimovich Zabolotskiy (Russian: Пётр Ефи́мович Заболо́тский or Заболоцкий; 1803 — March 12 [O.S. February 28] 1866) was a Russian portrait painter, representative of the romantic academicism of the Nicholas era, author of the widely known portrait of the poet Mikhail Lermontov. From 1857, he was an Academician of the Imperial Academy of Arts.

== Biography ==
He was born into a bourgeois family (according to another source, in the family of a poor craftsman). There is practically no information about Zabolotsky's childhood and youth, or his first experiences in fine art. He was close to the schools of A. G. Venetsianov, Orest Kiprensky and Vasiliy Tropinin.

A. R. Tomilov, a patron of the arts, collector and art theorist, contributed to the artist's creative growth. Thanks to his help, Zabolotsky entered the Imperial Academy of Arts (1825) as an auditor. During his studies, he was awarded two silver medals. Among his teachers were the portraitist Alexander Varnek and the historical painter Alexei Egorov. In 1857, Zabolotsky was awarded the title of academician. Mikhail Lermontov took painting lessons from Zabolotsky in Saint Petersburg. Zabolotsky is the author of two portraits of M. Lermontov painted in oil in 1837 and 1840. Despite the bright, sparkling hussar uniform (full dress uniform) in which Lermontov is depicted, attention is primarily drawn to the general inspiration of his appearance, the lively look of his expressive eyes. In 1862, he taught drawing at the St. Petersburg State Institute of Technology.

His son was the artist Pyotr Petrovich Zabolotsky (born 1842).

== Gallery ==
Paintings of Pyotr Zabolotsky

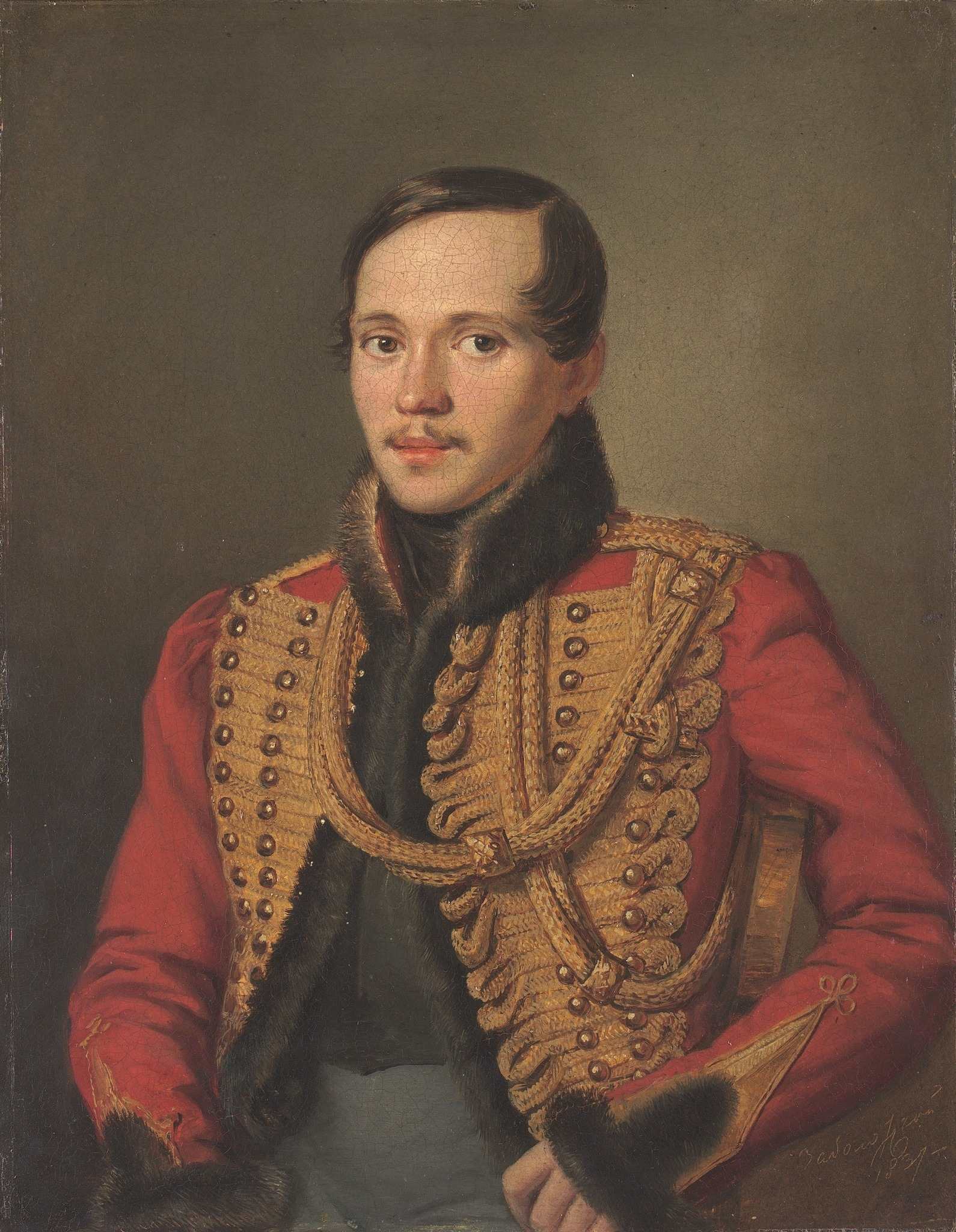
Portrait of Mikhail Lermontov (Zabolotsky) in the Men's uniform of the Life Guards Hussar Regiment (1837)

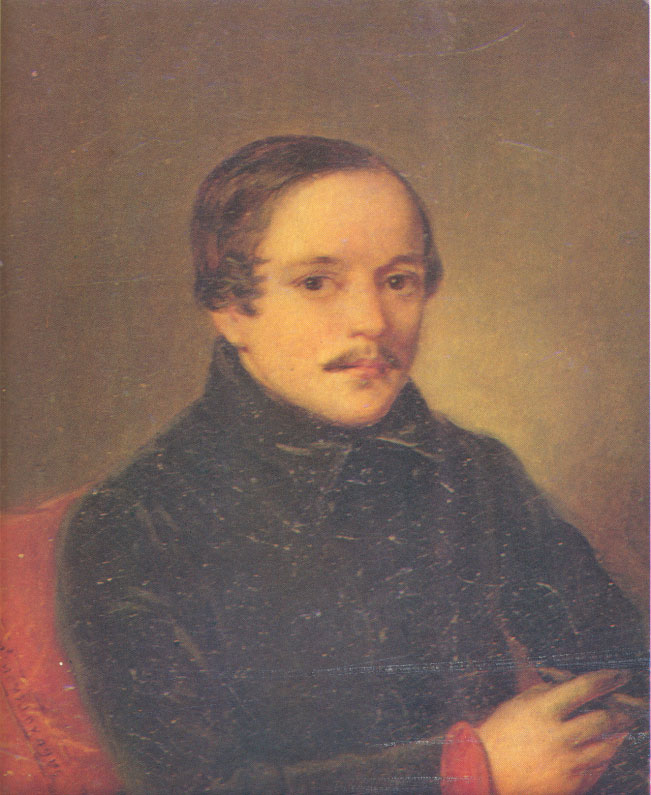
Lermontov in civilian clothes (1840)

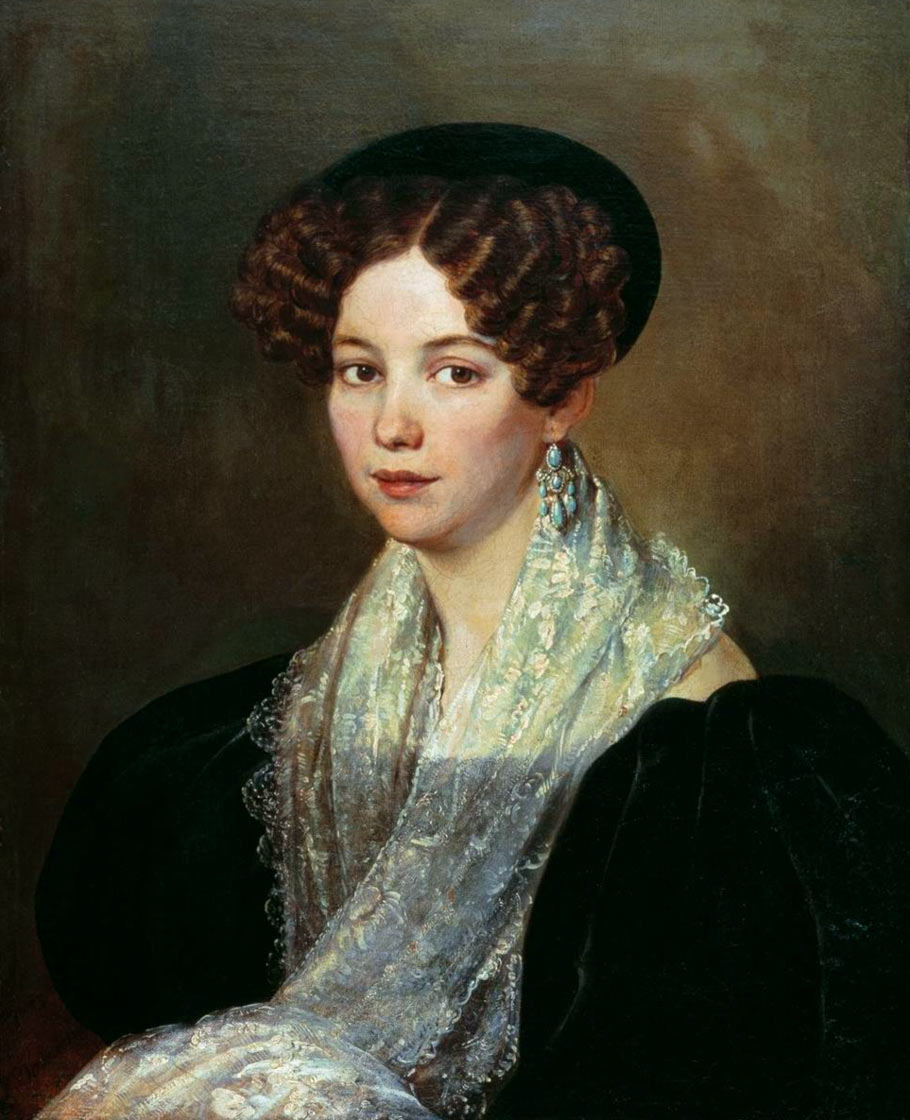
Portrait of a Young Woman in a Black Dress (1830s)

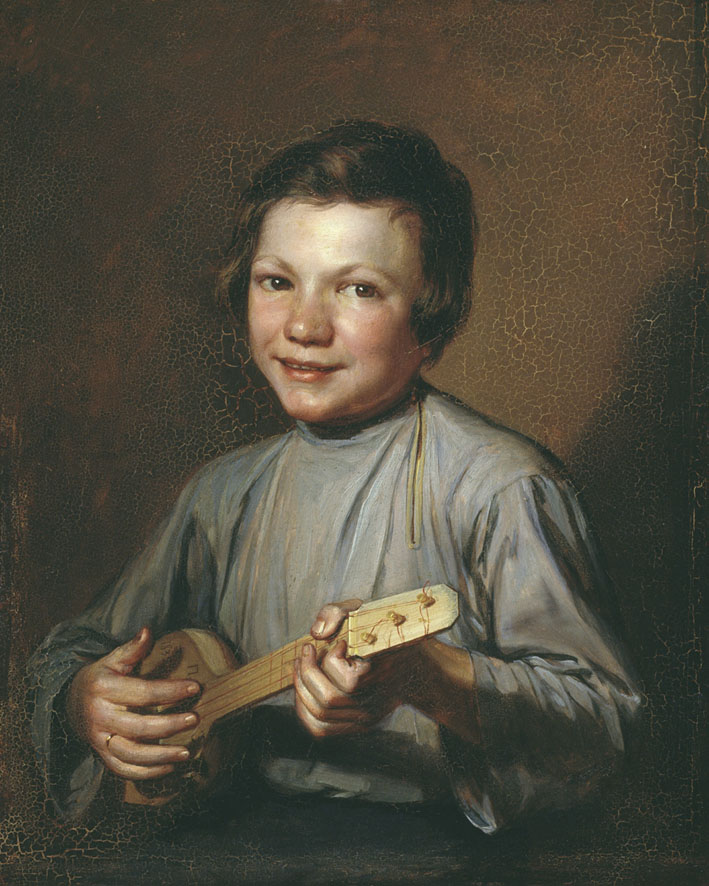
Boy with a balalaika (1835)

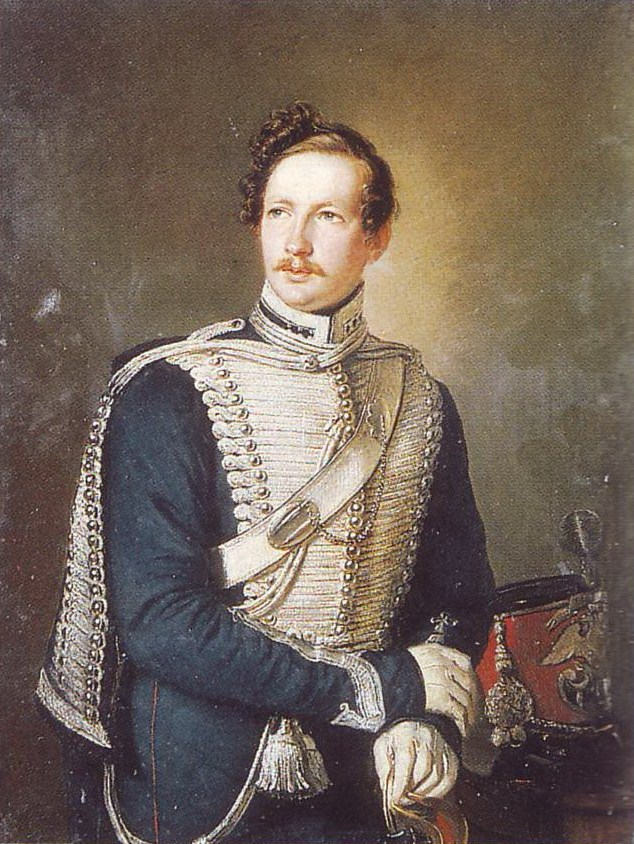
Nikolai Alekseevich Tomilov (1837)

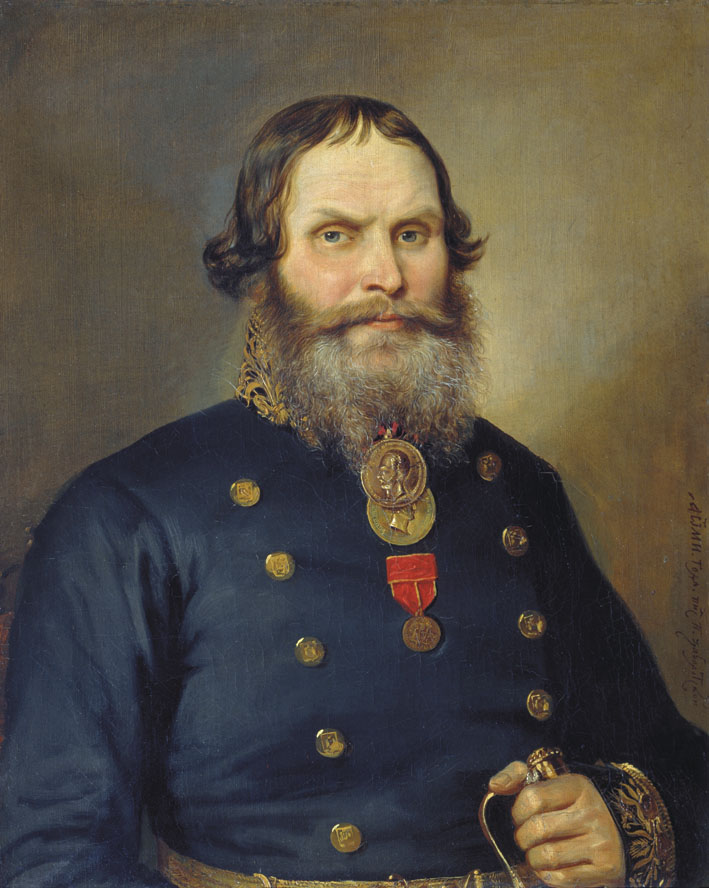
Tikhvin mayor

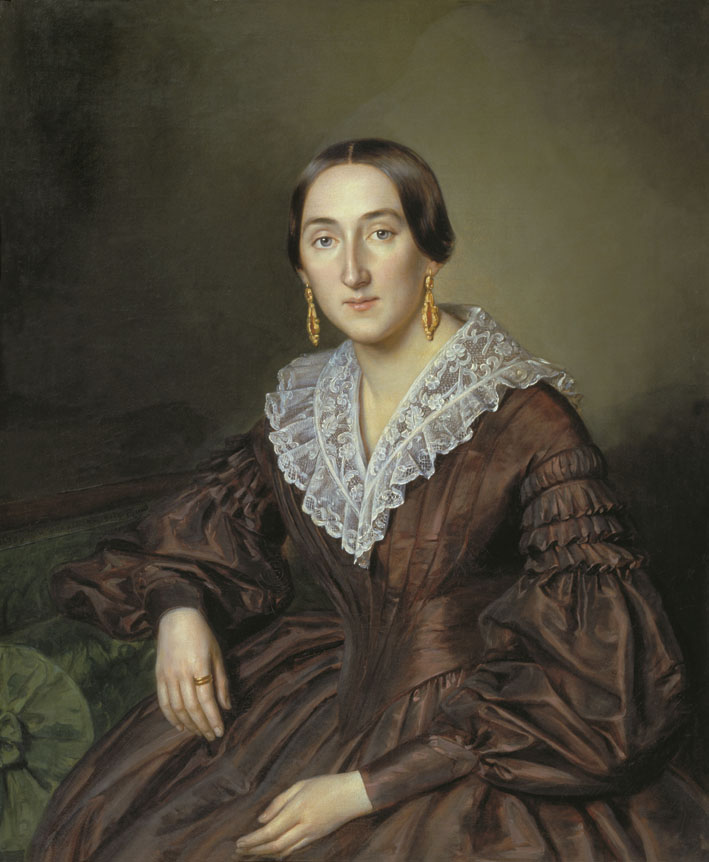
Portrait of N. V. Evreinova (1840)
