= Nikolay Laveretsky =

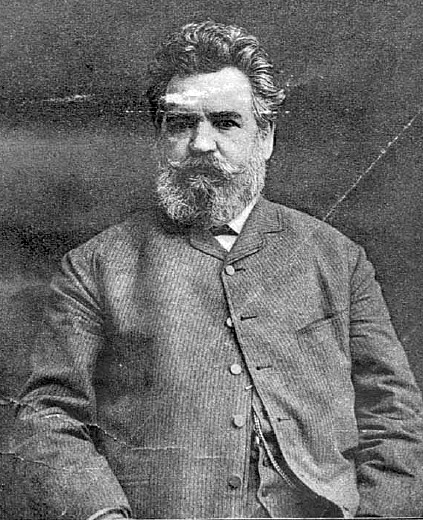
Nikolay Laveretsky (date unknown)

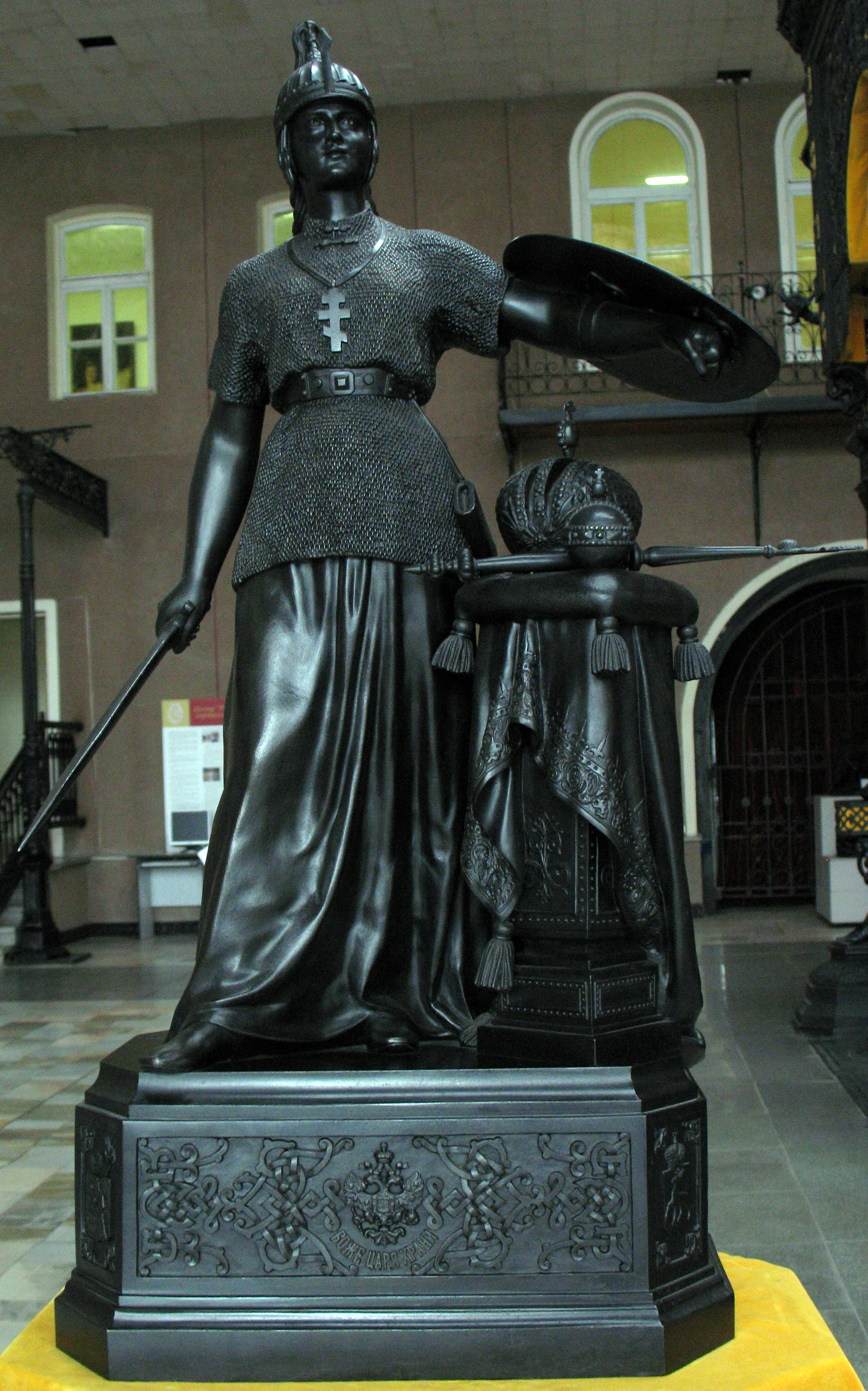
Russia

Nikolay Akimovich Laveretsky (Russian: Николай Акимович Лаверецкий; 13 February 1837, Moscow - 23 October 1907, Saint Petersburg) was a Russian sculptor and art professor.

== Biography ==
His father, Akim Laveretsky was also a sculptor; and his younger brother, Ivan, would become one as well. He initially attended the drawing school at the Imperial Society for the Encouragement of the Arts then, from 1851, studied at the Imperial Academy of Arts with Nikolai Pimenov.

During his time there, he received several awards; a large silver medal for his bas-relief of Achilles with the corpse of Hector (1857), a small gold medal for a bas-relief of Cincinnatus being named Dictator (1859) and, finally, the large gold medal for a bas-relief of Regulus returning to Carthage (1860). This was accompanied by a stipend to study abroad, and the title of "Artist First-Class".

He remained in Italy for many years. His sculpture of a boy and girl feeding a bird, sent from Rome in 1868, earned him the title of "academician". An assortment of small sculptures sent in 1870 resulted in his being named a professor. He returned to Russia that same year, and began teaching at the academy. He taught there until 1894, when a new charter was enacted and he was dismissed, "at his own request".

Together with Ivan Schroeder, Matvey Chizhov, and Hugo Zaleman, he took part in a major sculptural project known as the "Памятник Тысячелетию России" (Millennium of Russia), erected in Novgorod according to designs created by Mikhail Mikeshin. The monument contains a total of 128 figures. Laveretsky and his team worked on the eastern frieze, with 26 figures, representing "Государственные люди" (statesmen).

His best known work is the cast-iron statue, "Russia", which was created in 1896 at the Kasli foundry. In 1900, it was displayed in the Kasli pavilion at the Exposition Universelle in Paris. The pavilion was such a success that French President Émile Loubet offered to buy it for the equivalent of two million rubles. The offer was accepted, but Laveretsky's statue was excluded, as it was a symbol of "Mother Russia". The sale was never finalized, however, and the pavilion was dismantled. In 1957, the statue and parts of the pavilion were recreated from old drawings and models, and placed in an art gallery that has since become part of the Yekaterinburg Museum of Fine Arts.

He died in 1907, and is interred at the Smolensky Cemetery in Saint Petersburg.
