= Holy Trinity Cathedral =

Holy Trinity Cathedral, Cathedral of the Holy Trinity or Trinity Cathedral may refer to:

== Africa ==
- Holy Trinity Cathedral (Addis Ababa), Ethiopia
- Holy Trinity Cathedral (Accra), Ghana

== Americas ==
=== Canada ===
- Holy Trinity Cathedral (New Westminster), British Columbia
- Holy Trinity Ukrainian Orthodox Cathedral, Vancouver, British Columbia
- Holy Trinity Ukrainian Orthodox Metropolitan Cathedral, Winnipeg, Manitoba
- Cathedral of the Holy Trinity (Quebec), Quebec City

=== Caribbean ===
- Holy Trinity Cathedral, Port-au-Prince, Haiti
- Holy Trinity Cathedral (Kingston), Jamaica
- Holy Trinity Cathedral, Port of Spain, Trinidad and Tobago

=== Mexico ===
- Holy Trinity Cathedral, Autlán

=== South America ===
- Cathedral of the Most Holy Trinity, Buenos Aires, Argentina

=== United States ===
- Trinity Cathedral (Phoenix, Arizona)
- Holy Trinity Orthodox Cathedral (Chicago), Illinois
- Trinity Cathedral (Easton, Maryland)
- Cathedral of the Holy Trinity (New Ulm, Minnesota)
- Trinity Cathedral (Omaha, Nebraska)
- Trinity & St. Philip's Cathedral (Newark, New Jersey)
- Archdiocesan Cathedral of the Holy Trinity, New York City
- Trinity Cathedral (Cleveland, Ohio)
- Trinity Cathedral (Pittsburgh), Pennsylvania
- Holy Trinity Cathedral (Salt Lake City, Utah)

== Asia ==
- Holy Trinity Cathedral, Yangon, Burma
- Holy Trinity Church, Shanghai, China
- Holy Trinity Cathedral, Hong Kong
- Holy Trinity Cathedral, Palayamkottai, India
- Holy Trinity Cathedral, Jerusalem, Israel
- Holy Trinity Cathedral, Karachi, Pakistan

== Europe ==
- Holy Trinity Cathedral, Mostar, Bosnia and Herzegovina
- Holy Trinity Cathedral, Ruse, Bulgaria
- Bristol Cathedral, England
- Carlisle Cathedral, England
- Chichester Cathedral, England
- Ely Cathedral, England
- Gloucester Cathedral, England
- Norwich Cathedral, England
- Winchester Cathedral, England
- Holy Trinity Cathedral, Oulu, Finland
- American Cathedral in Paris, France
- Holy Trinity Cathedral of Tbilisi, Georgia
- Dresden Cathedral, Germany
- Cathedral of the Holy Trinity, Gibraltar
- Holy Trinity Cathedral, Athens, Greece
- Christ Church Cathedral, Dublin (formerly Cathedral of the Holy Trinity), Ireland
- Holy Trinity Cathedral, Liepāja, Latvia
- Holy Trinity Cathedral, Riga, Latvia
- Down Cathedral (Cathedral Church of the Holy and Undivided Trinity), Downpatrick, Northern Ireland
- Co-Cathedral Basilica of the Most Holy Trinity, Chełmża, Poland
- Oliwa Cathedral, Gdansk, Poland
- Holy Trinity Cathedral, Arad, Romania
- Holy Trinity Cathedral, Blaj, Romania
- Holy Trinity Cathedral, Gherla, Romania
- Holy Trinity Cathedral, Sibiu, Romania
- Holy Trinity Cathedral (Magadan), Magadan, Russia
- Trinity Cathedral, Novosibirsk, Russia
- Trinity Cathedral, Pskov, Russia
- Holy Trinity Cathedral of the Alexander Nevsky Lavra, St. Petersburg, Russia
- Old Trinity Cathedral (demolished), St. Petersburg, Russia
- Trinity Cathedral, Saint Petersburg, Russia
- Trinity Cathedral (Sergiyev Posad), Russia
- Trinity Cathedral, Trubchevsk, Russia
- Trinity Cathedral, Yekaterinburg, Russia
- Elgin Cathedral, Scotland
- Holy Trinity Cathedral, Niš, Serbia
- Holy Trinity Cathedral, Žilina, Slovakia
- Holy Trinity Cathedral (Chernihiv), Ukraine
- Holy Trinity Cathedral, Dnipro, Ukraine
- Trinity Cathedral, Kyiv, Ukraine
- Holy Trinity Orthodox Cathedral, Lutsk, Ukraine
- Holy Trinity Cathedral (Lymanske), Ukraine

== Oceania ==
- Holy Trinity Cathedral, Wangaratta, Victoria, Australia
- Holy Trinity Cathedral, Auckland, New Zealand

== See also ==
- The Cathedral Church of the Holy and Undivided Trinity (disambiguation)
- Holy Trinity Church (disambiguation)
- Trinity Episcopal Cathedral (disambiguation)
- Most Holy Trinity Cathedral
