= Trubchevsky =

Trubchevsky (masculine), Trubchevskaya (feminine), or Trubchevskoye (neuter) may refer to:

- Trubchevsky District, a district of Bryansk Oblast, Russia
- Trubchevsky Urban Administrative Okrug, an administrative division which the town of Trubchevsk in Trubchevsky District of Bryansk Oblast, Russia is incorporated as
- Trubchevskoye Urban Settlement, a municipal formation which Trubchevsky Urban Administrative Okrug in Trubchevsky District of Bryansk Oblast, Russia is incorporated as
- Trubchevsky, alternative spelling of the Trubetskoy family name
