= Cathedral of the Most Holy Trinity =

The denomination Cathedral of the Most Holy Trinity may refer to:

- Cathedral of the Most Holy Trinity, Bermuda (Anglican)
- Cathedral of the Most Holy Trinity, Buenos Aires (Russian Orthodox)
- Co-Cathedral Basilica of the Most Holy Trinity, Chełmża, Poland (Roman Catholic)
- Cathedral of the Most Holy Trinity, Huancayo, Peru (Roman Catholic)
- Cathedral of the Most Holy Trinity, Montevideo (Anglican)
- Cathedral of the Most Holy Trinity, Waterford (Roman Catholic)
- Cathedral of the Most Holy Trinity (Daet), Philippines (Roman Catholic)
- Cathedral of the Most Holy Trinity (Talibon), Philippines (Roman Catholic)

== See also ==
- Holy Trinity Cathedral
