= Filippovichi =

Filippovichi (Russian: Филипповичи) is the name of several rural localities in Russia:

- Filippovichi, Bryansk Oblast, a selo in Filippovichsky Selsoviet of Trubchevsky District of Bryansk Oblast
- Filippovichi, Leningrad Oblast, a village in Yam-Tesovskoye Settlement Municipal Formation of Luzhsky District of Leningrad Oblast
- Filippovichi, Moscow Oblast, a village in Gololobovskoye Rural Settlement of Zaraysky District of Moscow Oblast
