= Holy Trinity Cathedral, Chernihiv =

Church in Chernihiv Oblast, Ukraine

Holy Trinity Cathedral
- Свято-Троїцький собор
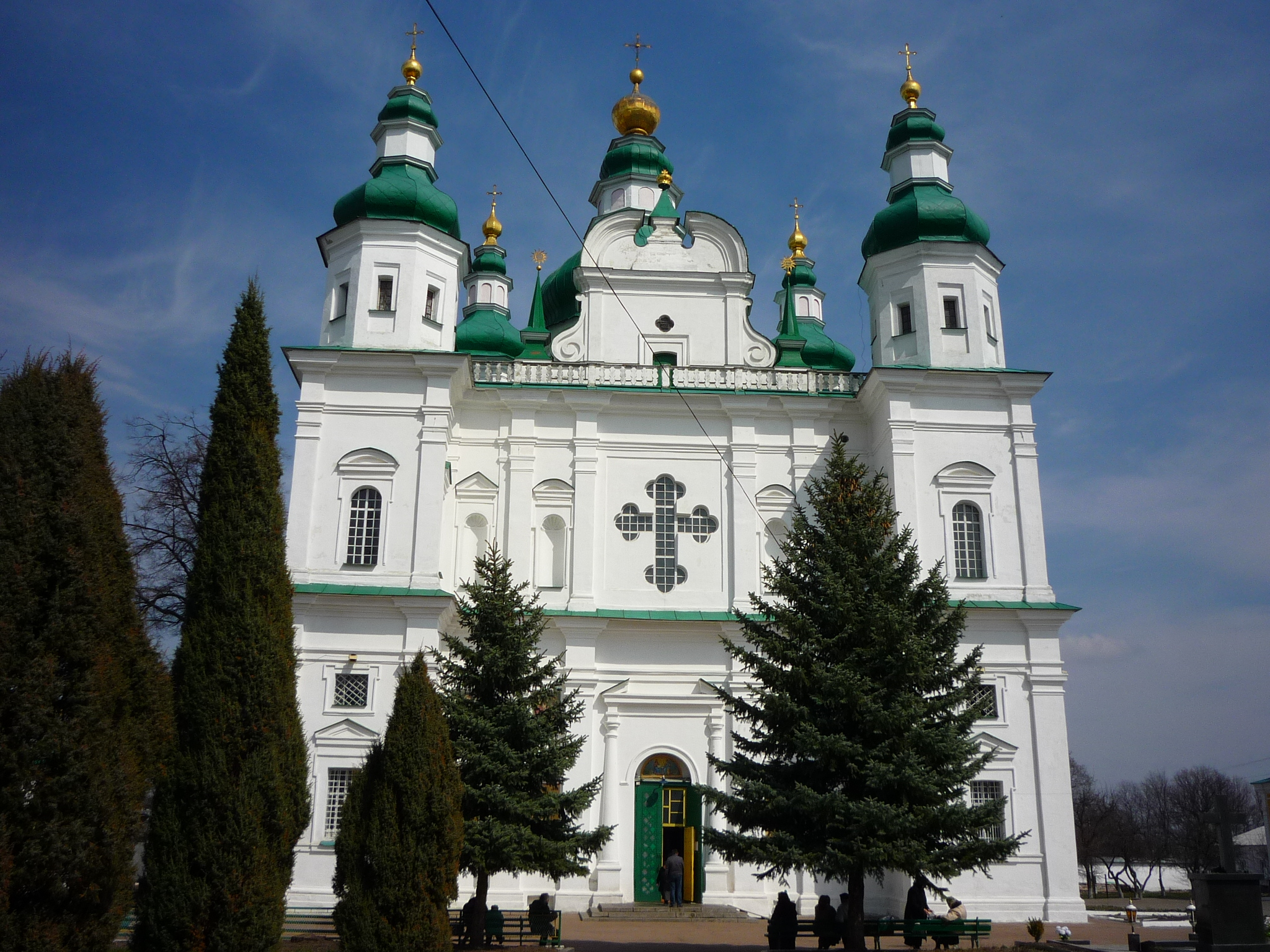
- Holy Trinity Cathedral in Chernihiv
- Holy Trinity Cathedral
- 51°28′38″N 31°16′49″E
- Location: Boldynskyi Ln, 92, Trinity Monastery, Chernihiv, Chernihiv Oblast, 14030
- Country: Ukraine
- Denomination: Eastern Orthodox Church
- Website: oldchernihiv.com/troitsko-illinskiy-monastyr/

History
- Status: Chapel
- Founder: Ivan Mazepa

Architecture
- Functional status: Active
- Architect(s): Ivan Baptista, Lazar Baranovych
- Architectural type: Church
- Style: Ukrainian Baroque
- Years built: 16
- Groundbreaking: 1679

Administration
- Diocese: Chernihiv

Immovable Monument of National Significance of Ukraine
- Official name: Троїцький собор (Trinity Cathedral)
- Type: History, Architecture
- Reference no.: 250044/1-Н

The Holy Trinity Cathedral (Ukrainian: Свято-Троїцький собор, romanized: Sviato-Troitskyi sobor) is an Eastern Orthodox Church church in Chernihiv. It is considered to be a notable architectural monument of the Hetmanate period in Chernihiv (1695). It used to be the main cathedral of the Trinity Monastery.

== Gallery ==
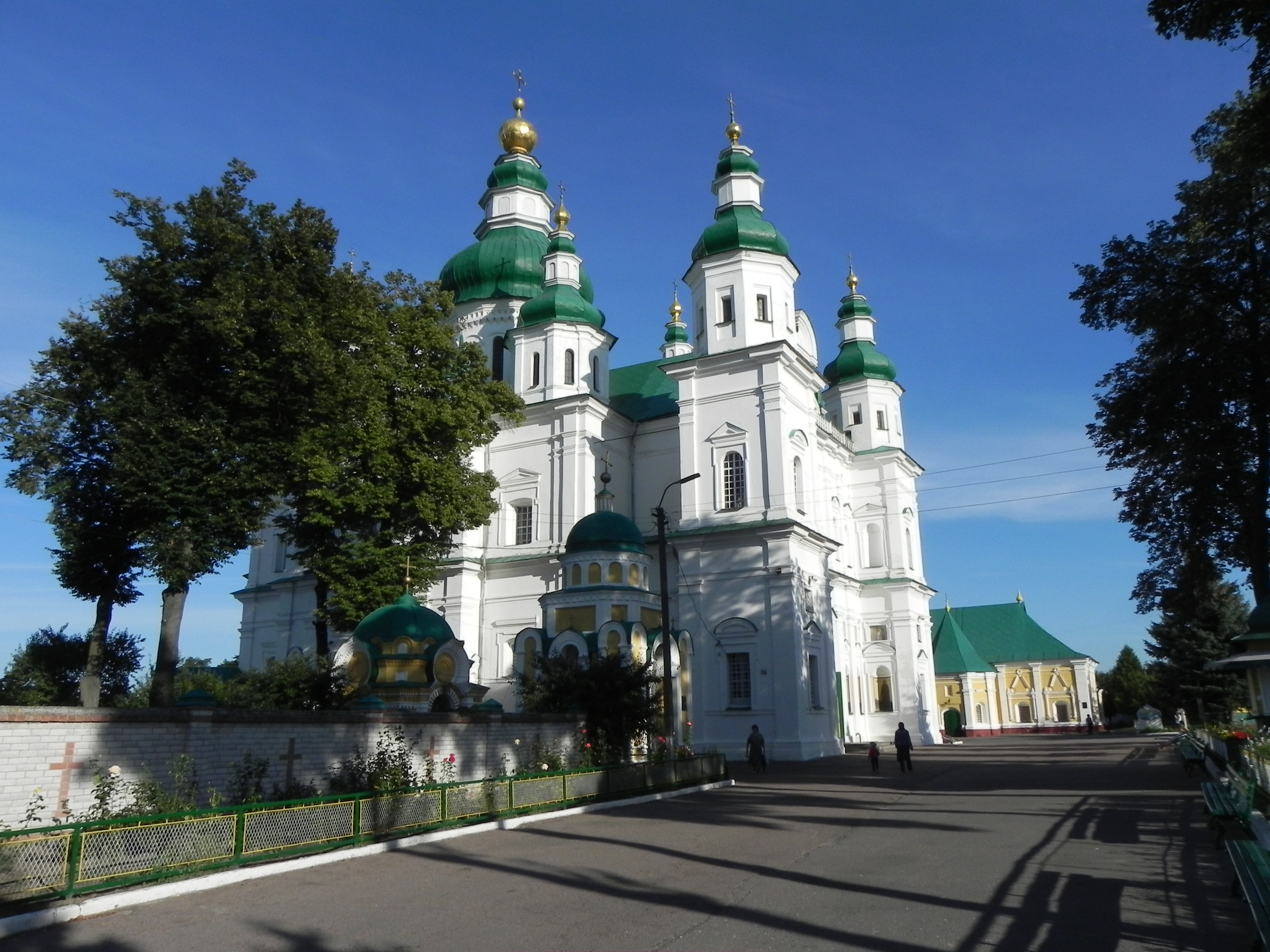

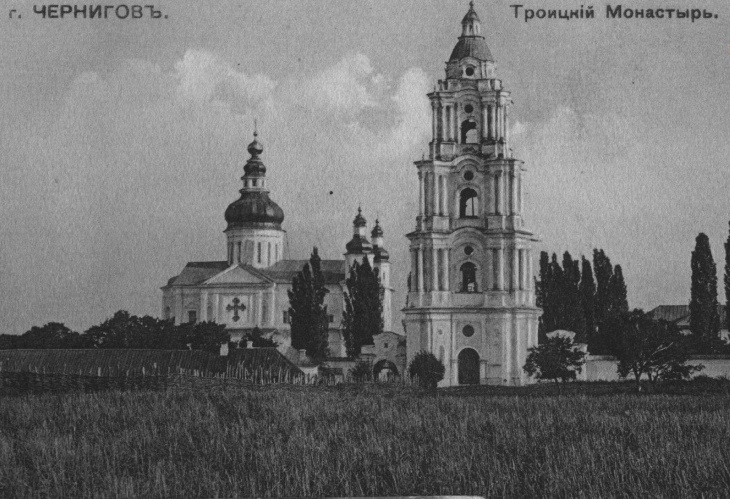

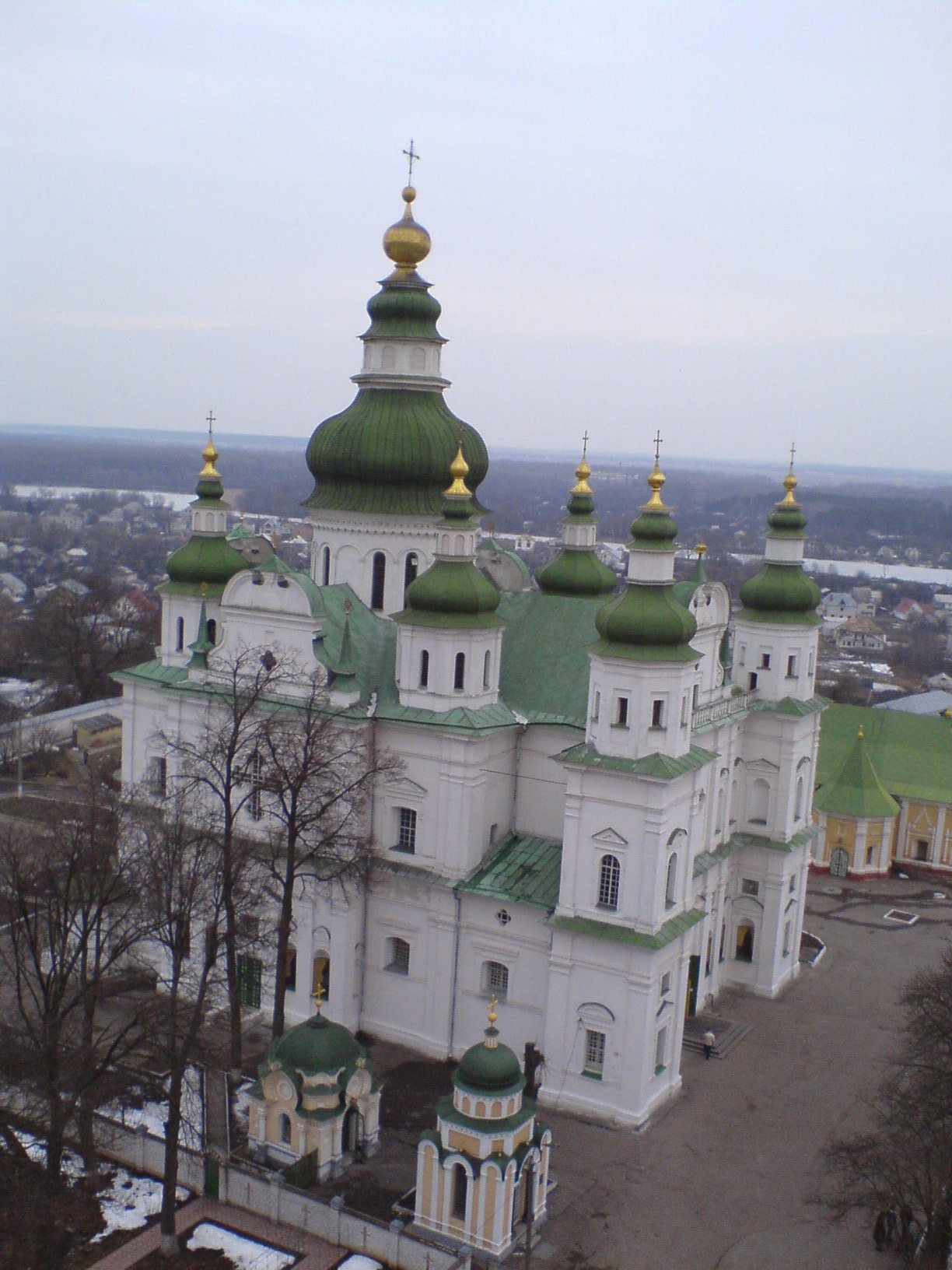

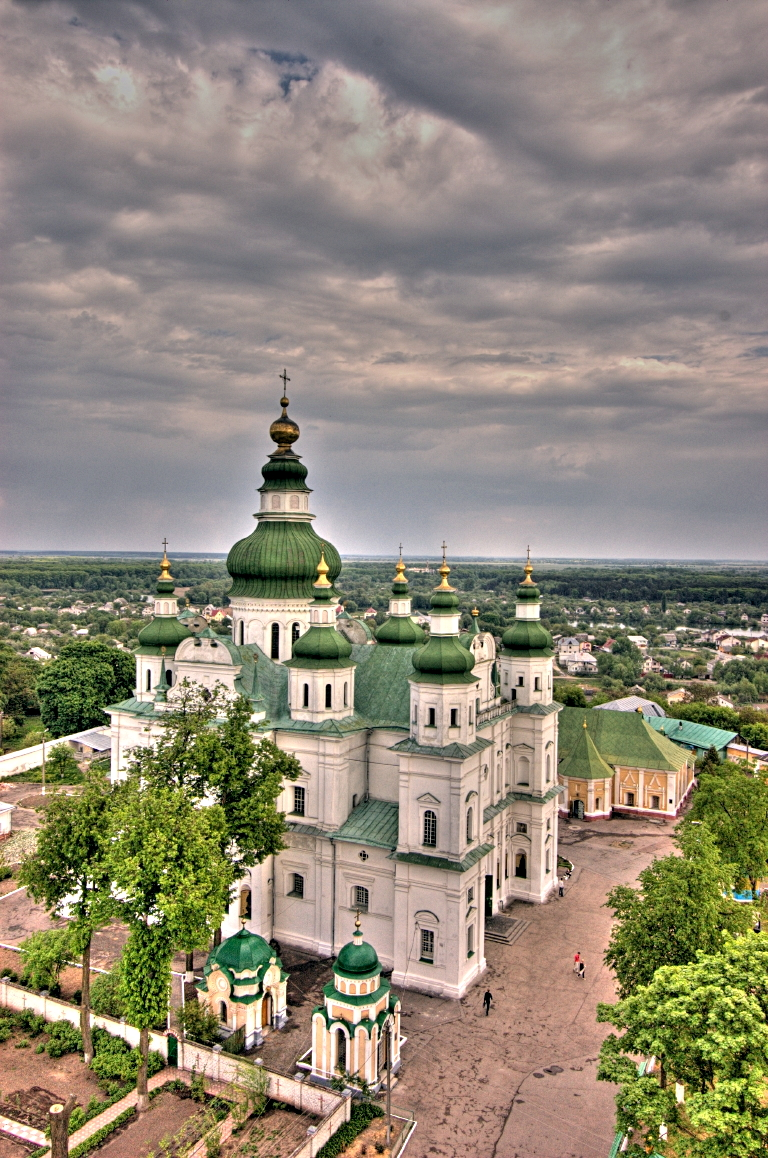

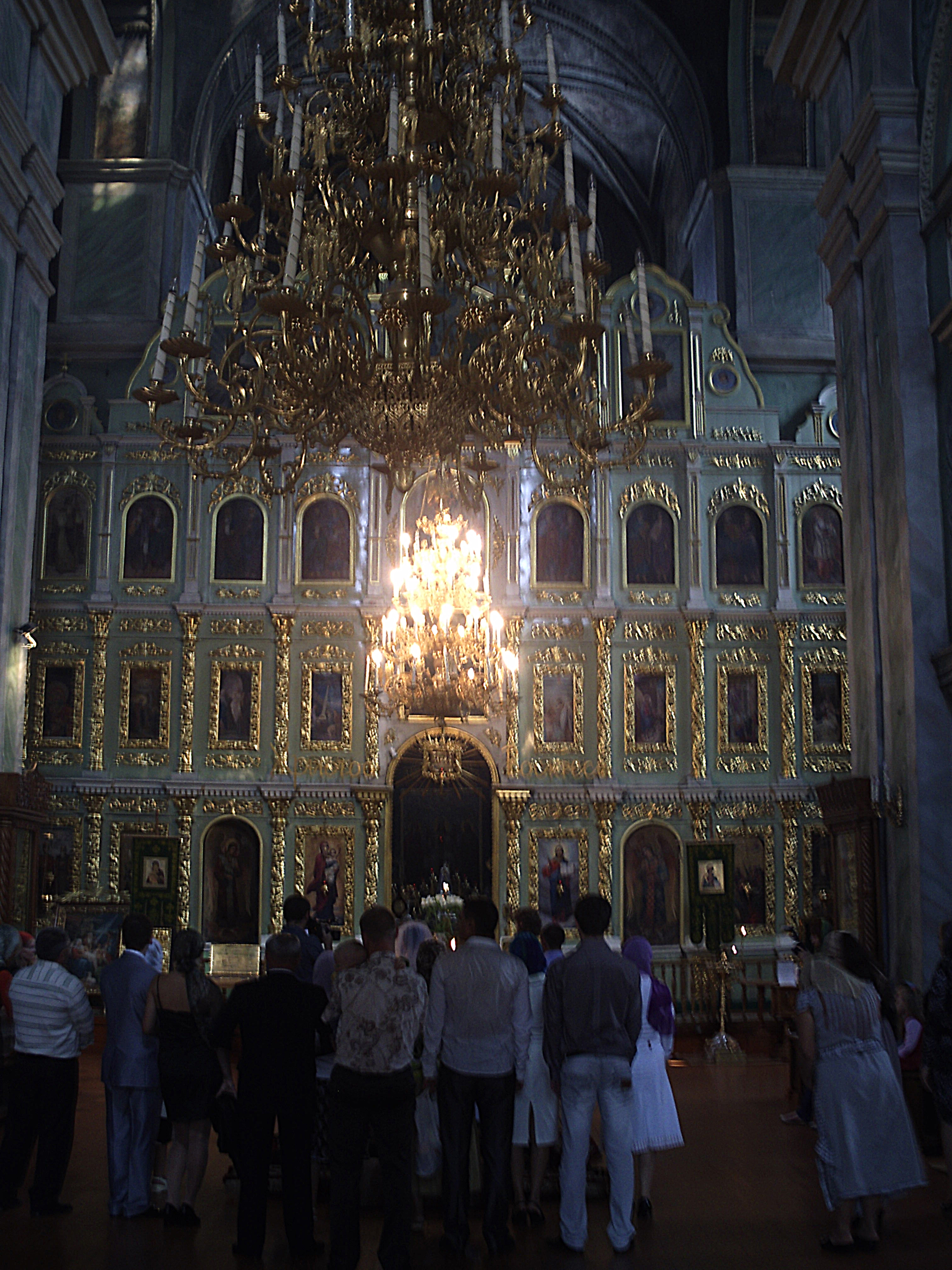

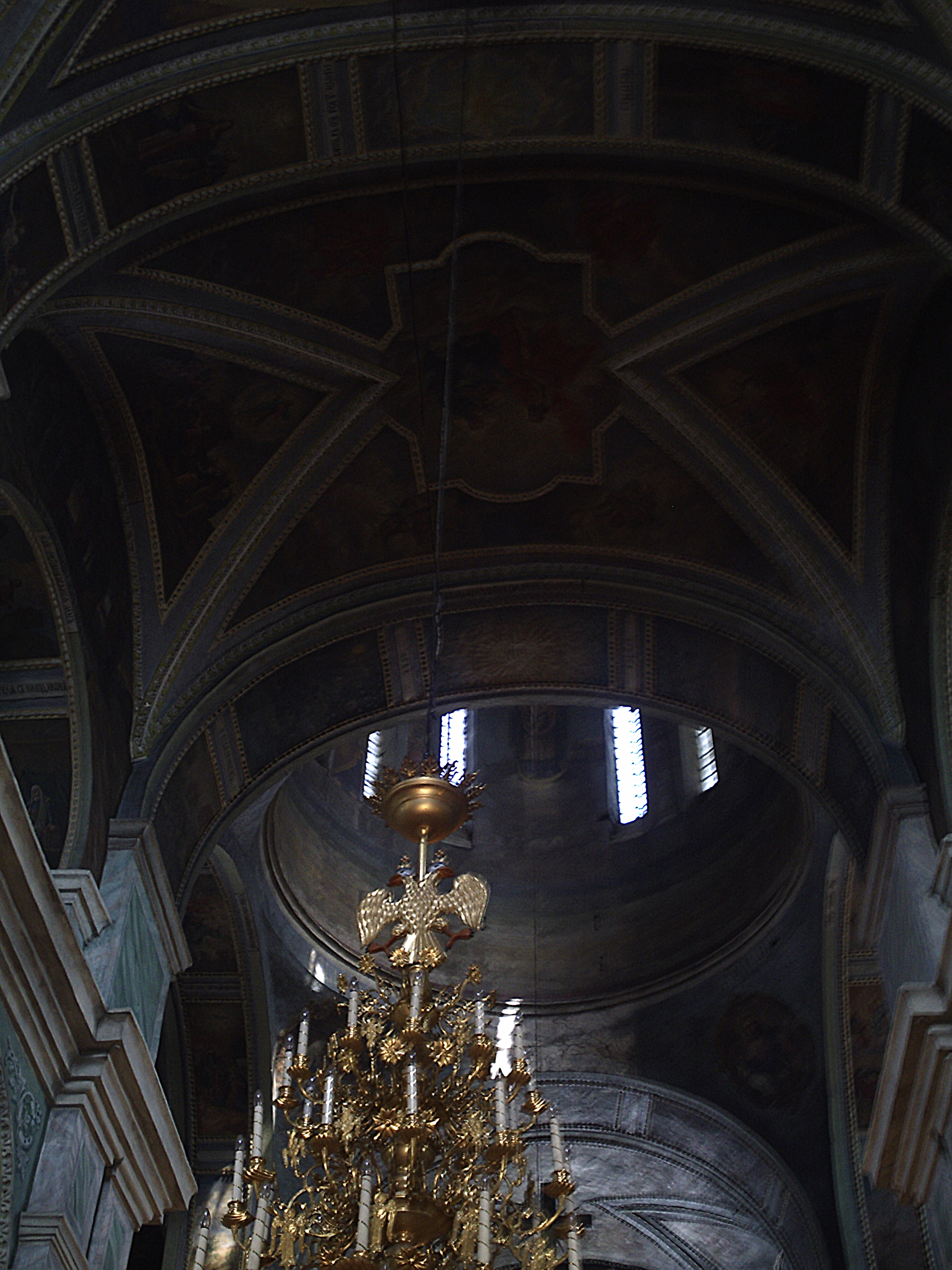

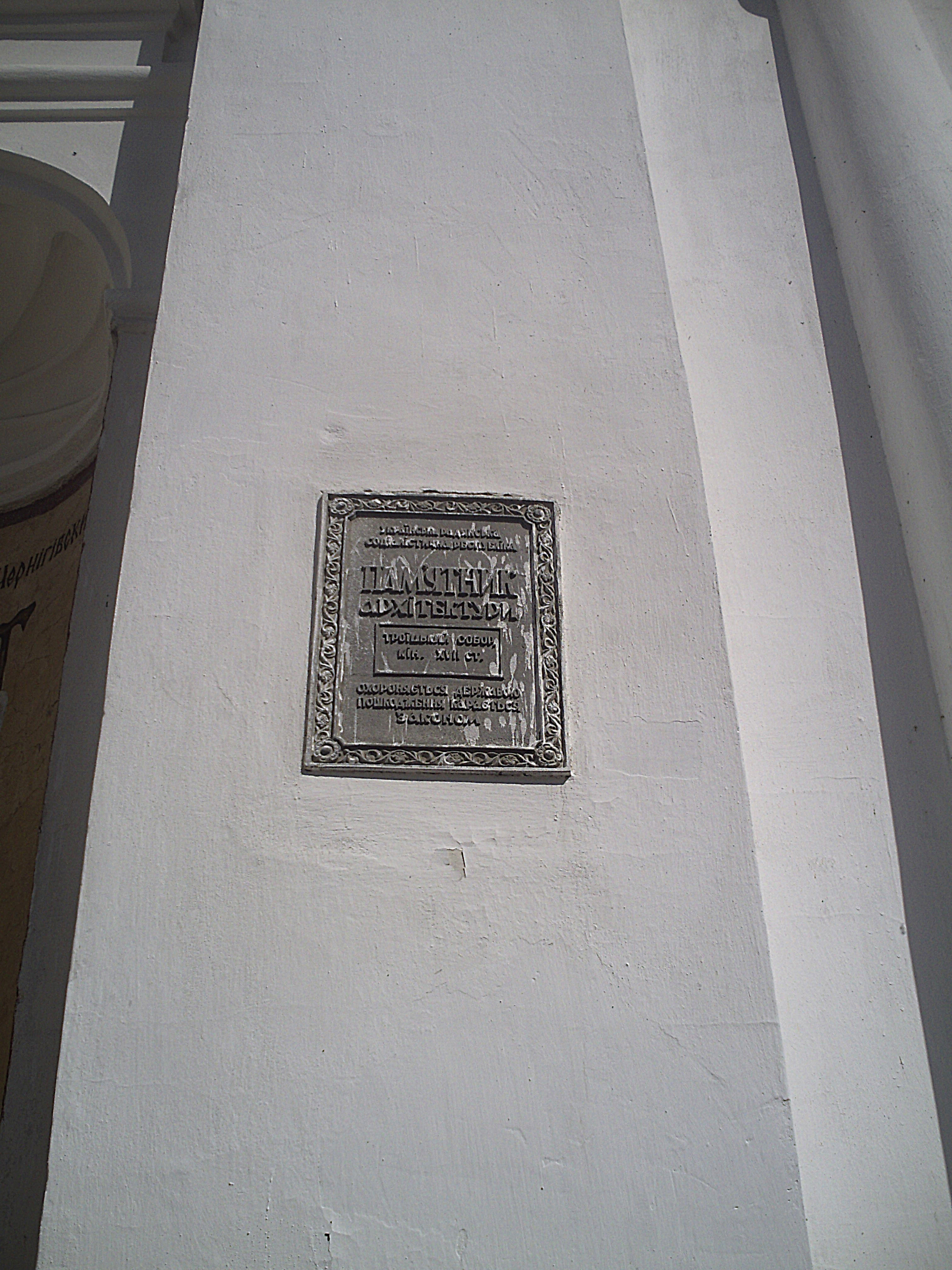

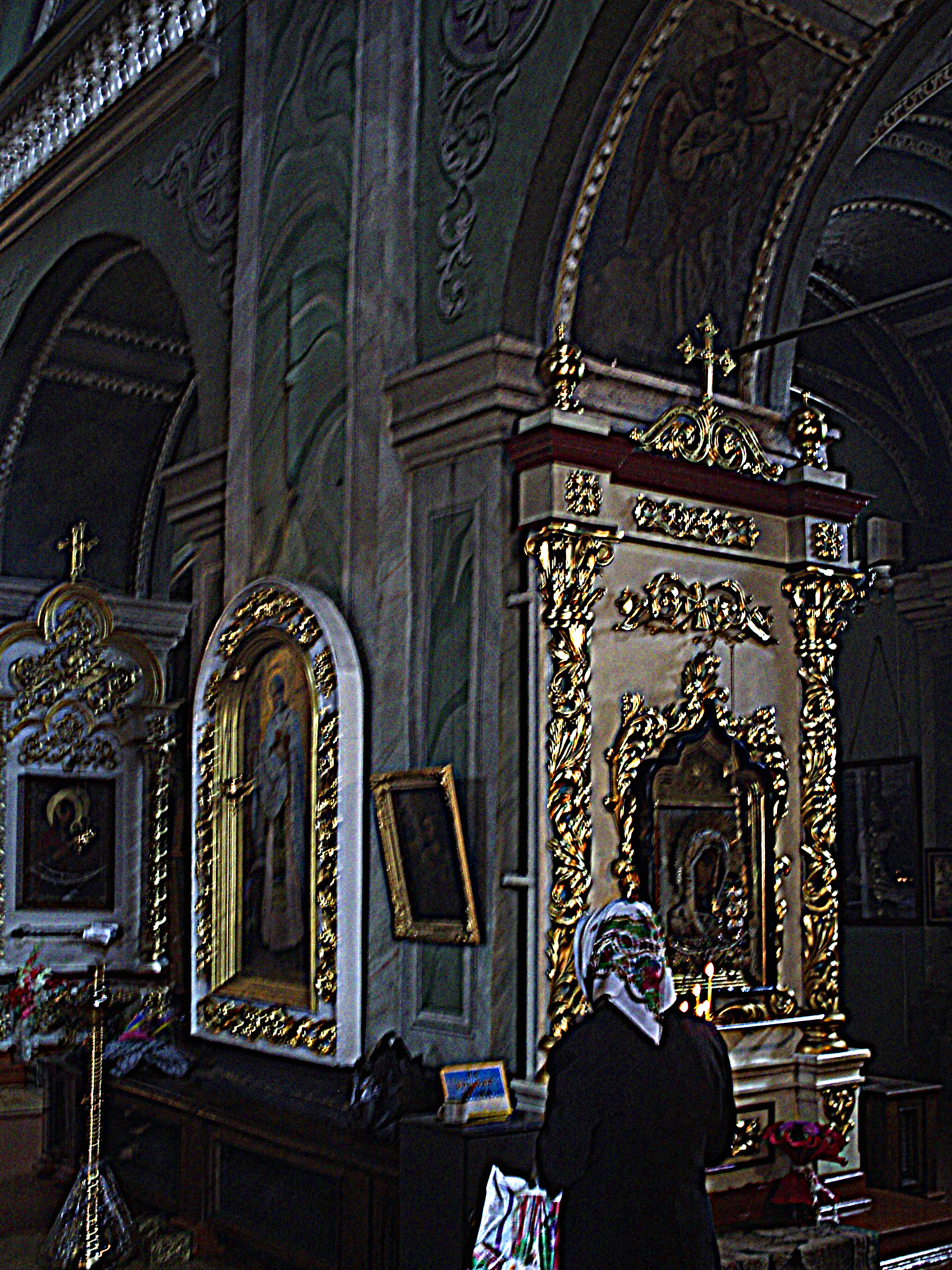

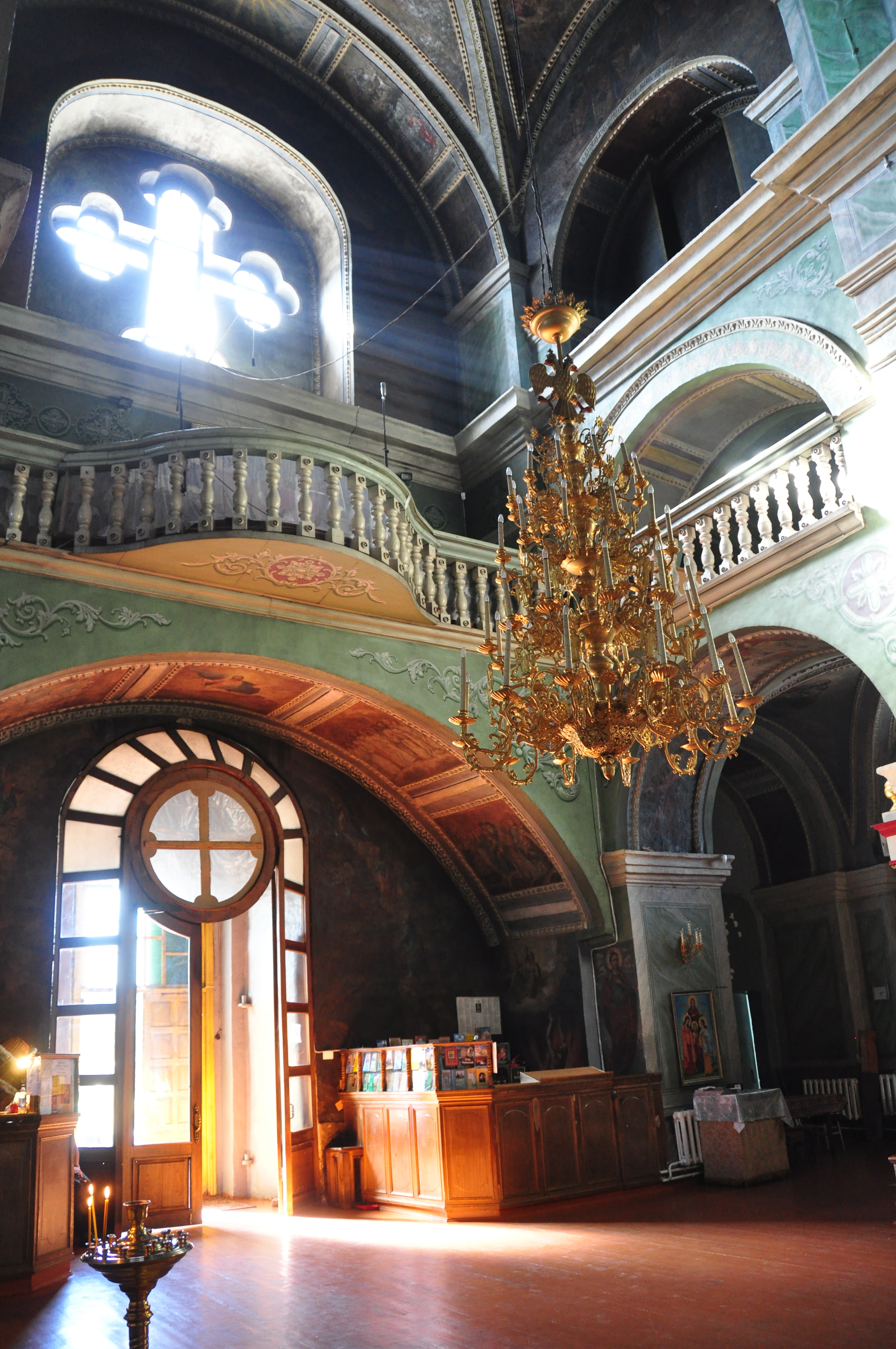

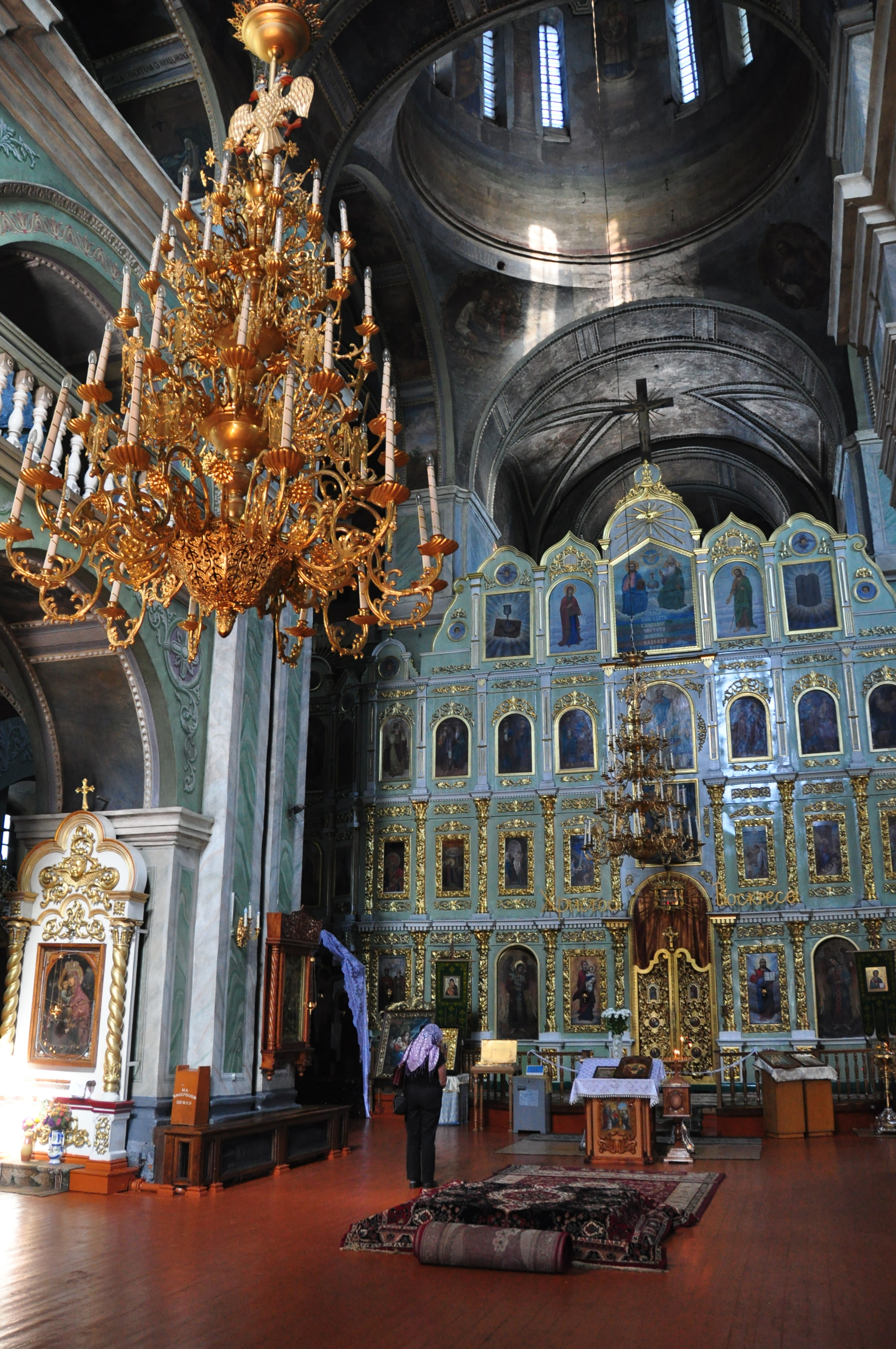

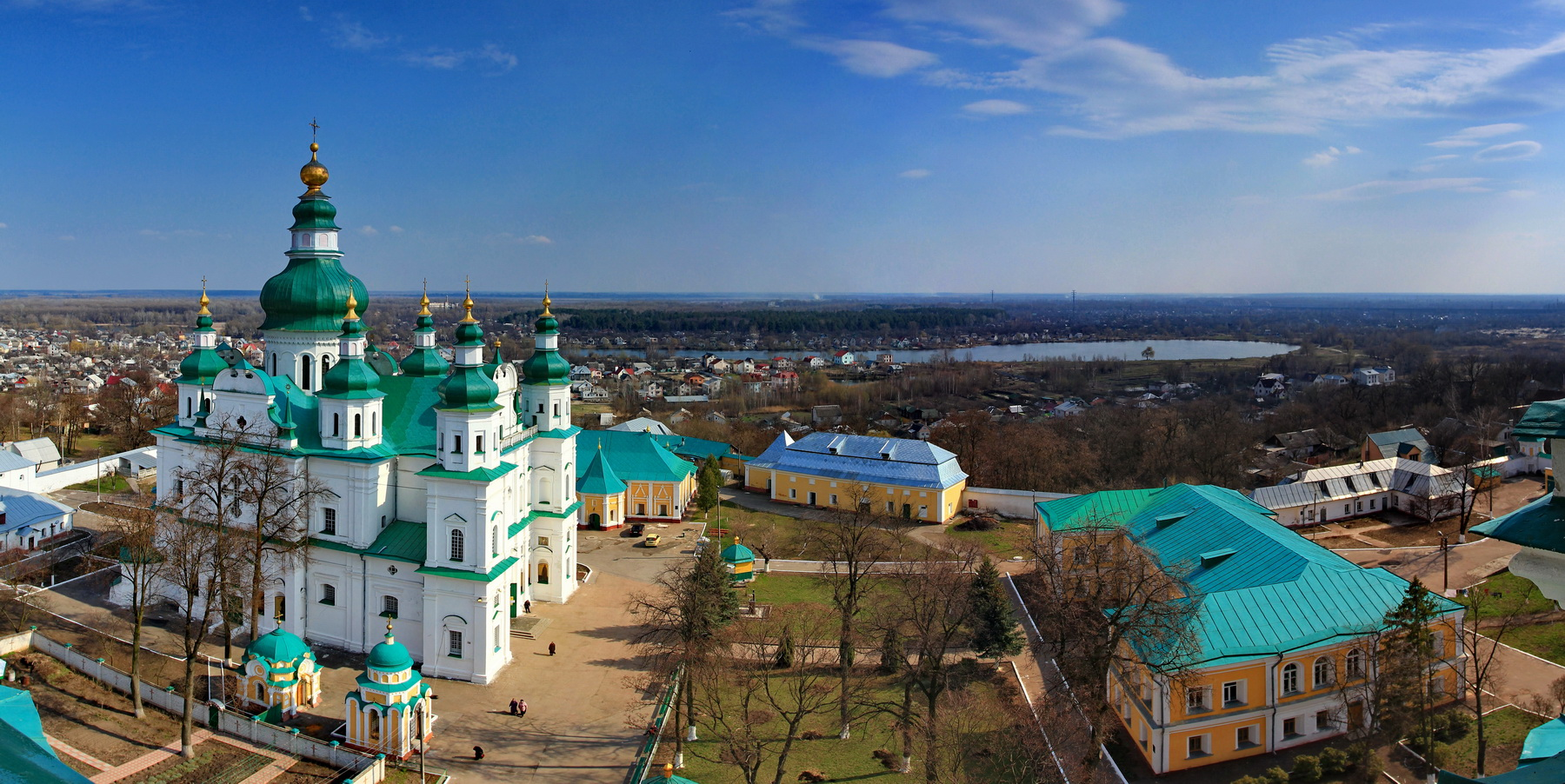

== See also ==
- List of Churches and Monasteries in Chernihiv
- Holy Trinity Cathedral
