= The Cathedral Church of the Holy and Undivided Trinity =

The Cathedral Church of the Holy and Undivided Trinity is the formal name of a number of cathedrals:

- Bristol Cathedral
- Carlisle Cathedral
- Down Cathedral
- Ely Cathedral
- Norwich Cathedral (more commonly given as "Cathedral of the Holy and Undivided Trinity")
- Cathedral of the Most Holy Trinity, Waterford (commonly called "Waterford Cathedral")

== See also ==
- Holy Trinity Cathedral (disambiguation)
- Holy Trinity Church (disambiguation)
