= Cathedral of the Assumption of the Blessed Virgin Mary (Lymanske) =

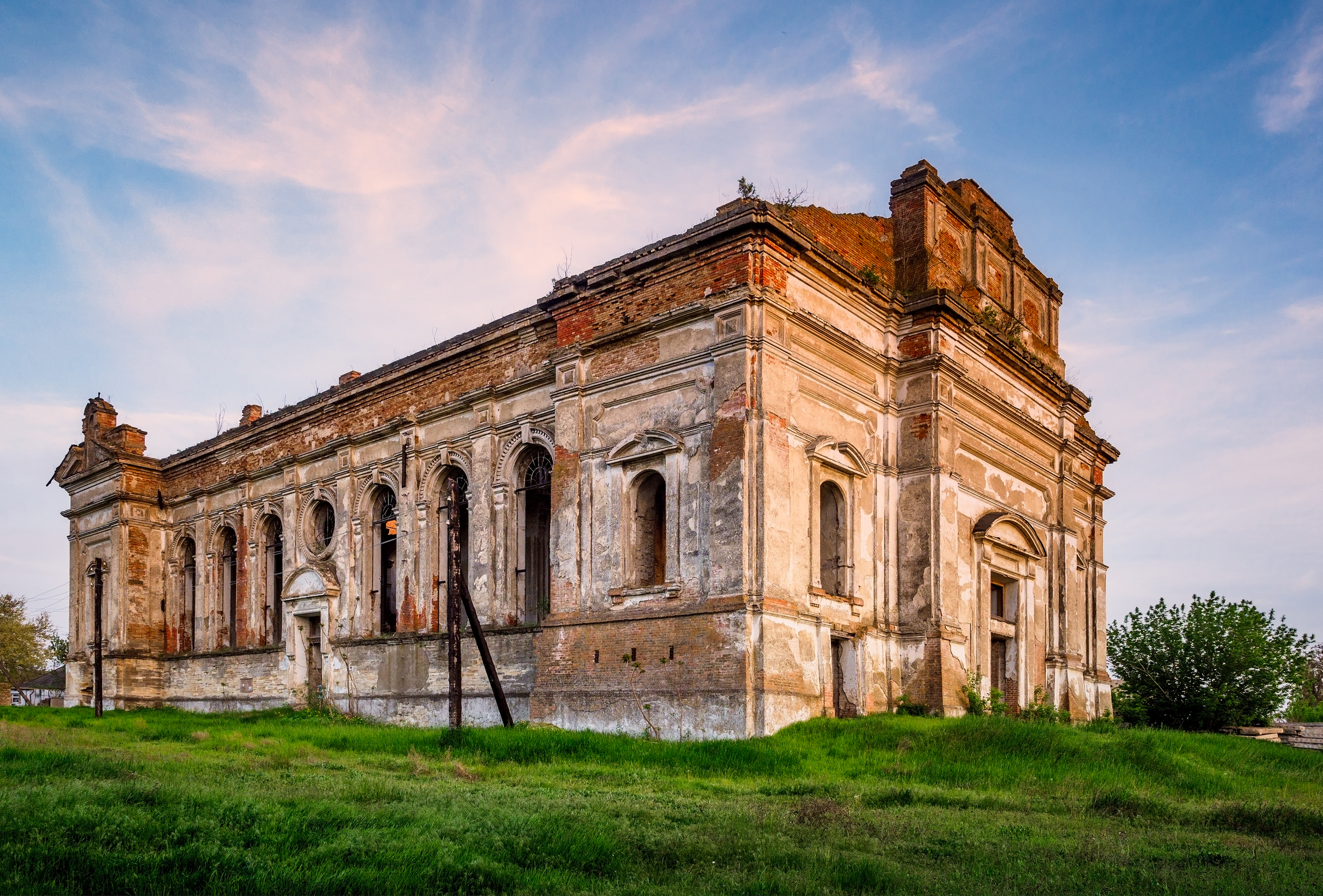
- The ruins of the cathedral

- Location within Odesa Oblast Location within Ukraine
- 46°40′37″N 29°58′15″E
- Location: Lymanske
- Country: Ukraine
- Denomination: Roman Catholic

History
- Status: Ruin
- Founded: 24 August 1897
- Dedicated: 25 November 1901

Architecture
- Functional status: Preserved
- Heritage designation: Memorial to the Cultural Heritage of Ukraine
- Designated: 2013 (#51-239-0001)
- Architectural type: Cathedral
- Style: Renaissance Revival
- Construction cost: 110,000 Roubles
- Closed: 1919, 1944

Specifications
- Materials: Brick

Cathedral of the Assumption of the Blessed Virgin Mary – is a ruinate church of the former German Catholic village of Selz, now Lymanske in Rozdilna Raion, Odesa Oblast, Ukraine. At the beginning of the 20th century, it was the largest Roman Catholic Church in southern Ukraine.

== Description ==
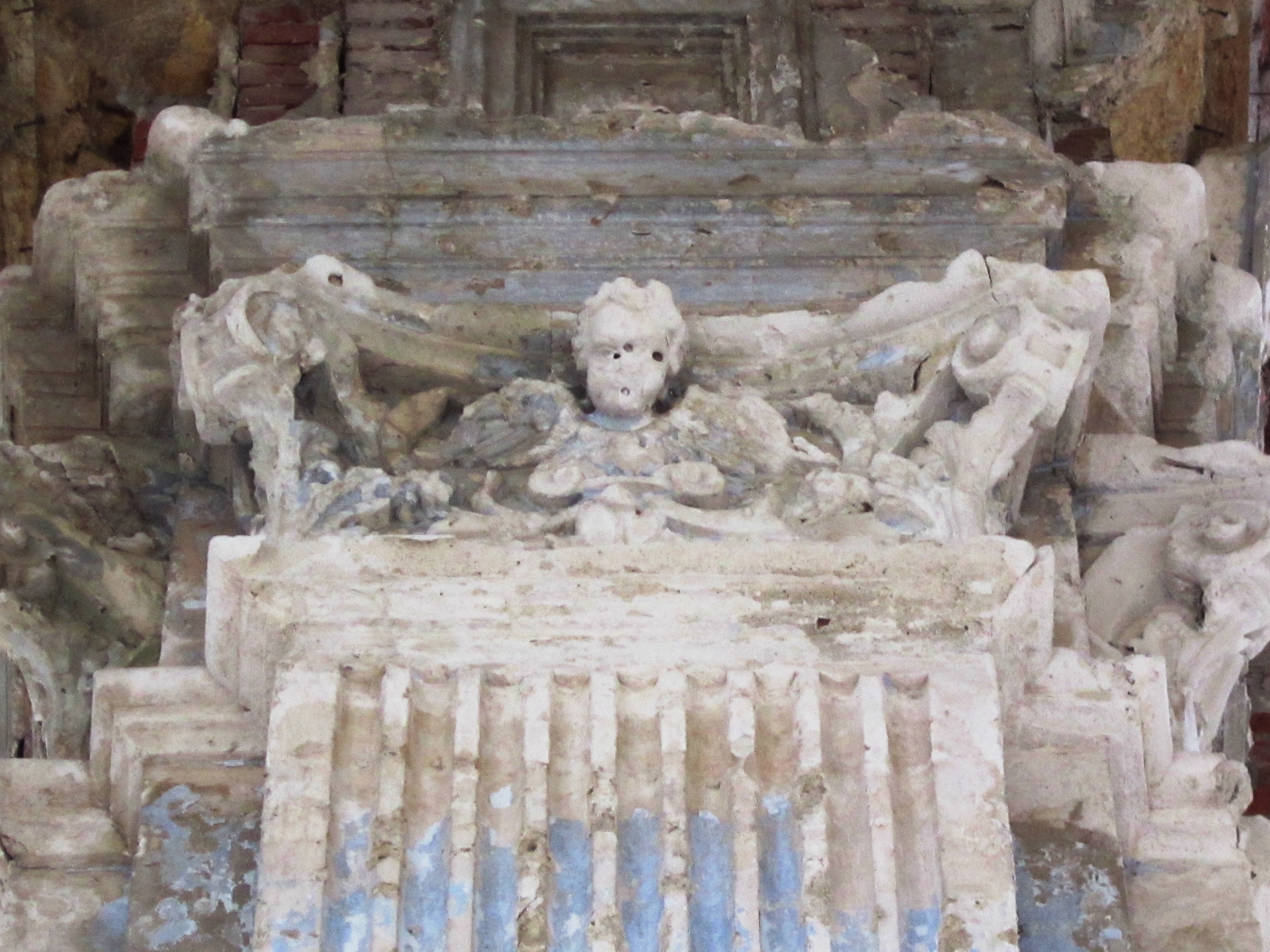
Columns of the church

The Cathedral was built in Renaissance Revival architectural style; it has three aisles and two towers. The Cathedral in Salzburg, Austria was a prototype for the church. Newly built, the cathedral was marked by rich interior decoration. In 1901 a carved altar ordered from Austria was installed in the church, in 1903 a cathedra was built, in 1904 – altar of repose. In 1906 wooden statues of Saint Anthony and the crucified Christ were set up in the cathedral. Paintings with stories from the Bible were made on the walls.

== History ==
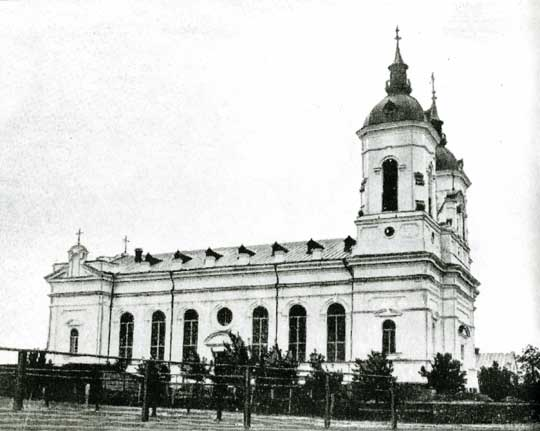
View of the cathedral in the early 20th century

At the beginning of 19th century there was a significant inflow of the German colonists to Novorossiya at that time (modern region north of the Black Sea, Bessarabia and the Crimea). According to the manifesto of Catherine II from July 22, 1763, foreigners were invited to come to Russia and settle whenever they wanted. In the beginning of 19th century after the Napoleonic Wars, Germany being occupied by France was found in a tough economic state. And many merchants and trades people were forced to leave their home state. In 1808 the order of Tsar Alexander I went forth “About providing assistance and headright to foreign sodbusters in Novorossiya. Therefore in 1808 Kuchurhanskyi colonists’ district (area) with administrative center in Selz settlement, modern urban-type settlement Lymanske. The district included six catholic colonies.

Since 1821 there was a catholic church in the settlement. In 1901 on the place of the church there was a three-aisle cathedral that had two towers 57, 9 meters (1900 feet) in height. In contrast to the majority of the churches in Odesa area built of limestone only, Cathedral of the Assumption in Selz was built of bricks. The cost of brick for the Cathedral construction was 110,000 Russian roubles.

=== Destruction of the cathedral ===
In 1919 German colonists from Odesa initiated the revolt against Prodrazvyorstka (food apportionment, the partition of the requested total amount as obligations from the suppliers) and mobilizing to the Soviet Red Army. The revolt was repressed, and all possessions of the participants were captured. Thereby the cathedral was closed, and its towers were destroyed. During the soviet times the cathedral building was used for a club. When the standardized building for a club was constructed, the cathedral fell into ruin.

At the moment the cathedral is in ruins. At a rough estimate its reconstruction would cost more than 6 million of dollars. The catholic community of the southern Germany initiated the idea of the church reconstruction. The requirement for the reconstruction was staying in the same denomination; the Cathedral has to belong to Roman Catholics. Ukrainian Orthodox Church of Moscow Patriarchate has stood in the way of the reconstruction of this piece of architecture since it was against existence of any Catholic churches on “its own” territories.

== Gallery ==
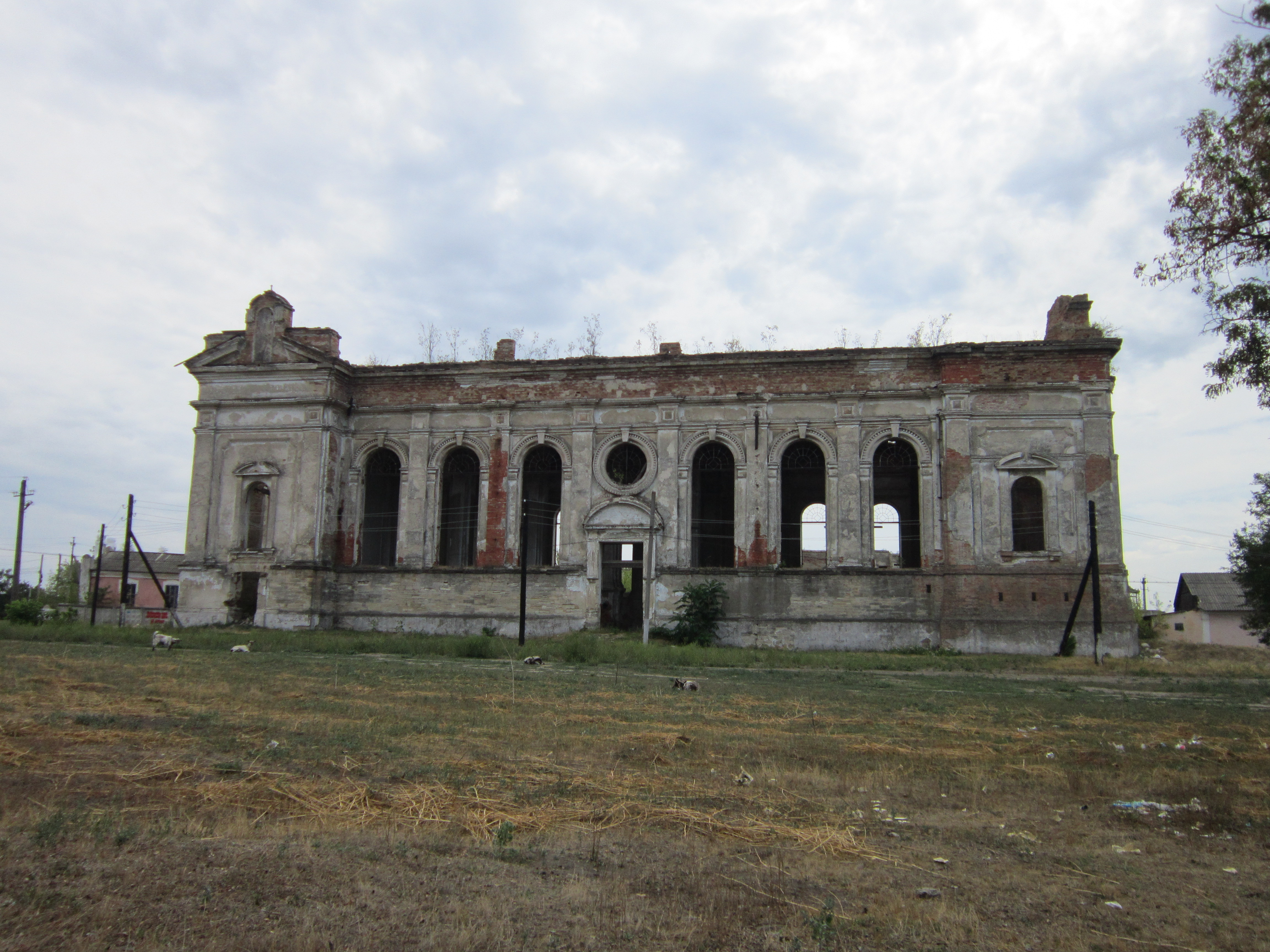
Overall view

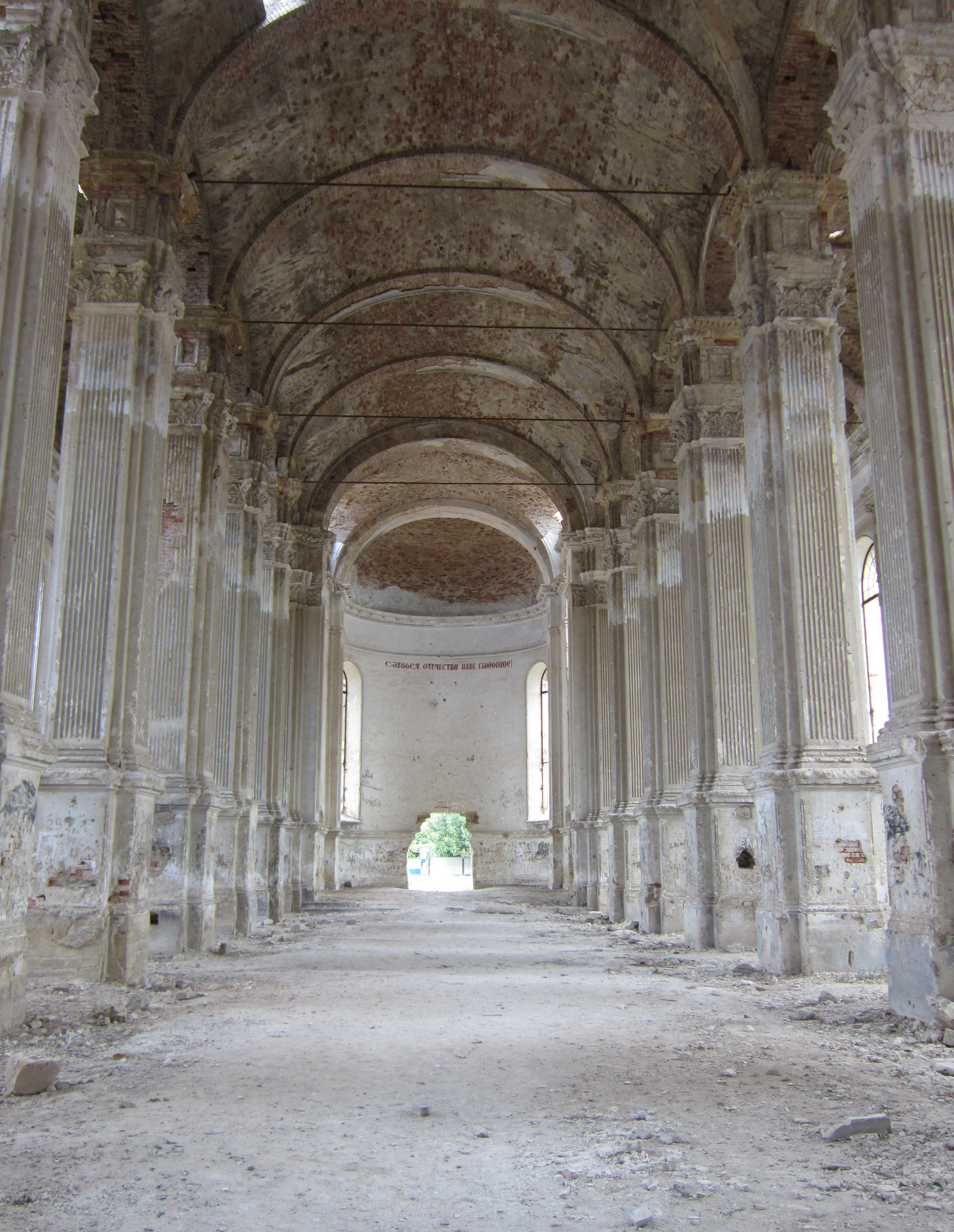
View inside the church

== See also ==
- Holy Trinity Cathedral (Lymanske)
- Salzburg Cathedral
