= Trubchevsk =

Town in Bryansk Oblast, Russia

Trubchevsk Трубчевск
- Town
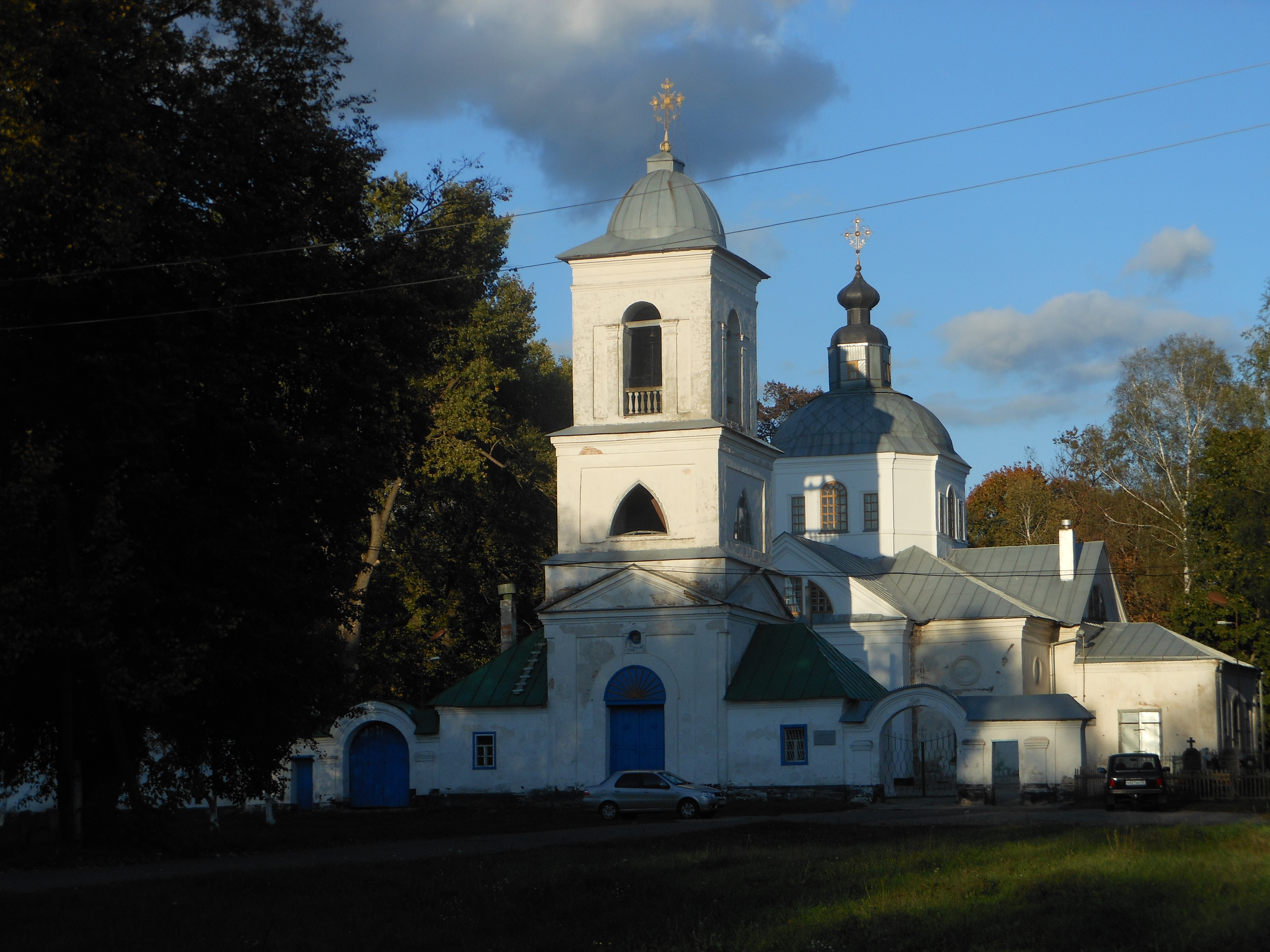
- Church of the Presentation of Jesus at the Temple Holy Trinity cathedral

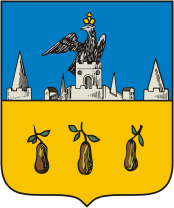
- Coat of arms
- Interactive map of Trubchevsk
- Location of Trubchevsk Trubchevsk (Europe) Trubchevsk (Russia)
- Coordinates: 52°34′N 33°46′E
- Country: Russia
- Federal subject: Bryansk Oblast
- Administrative district: Trubchevsky District
- Urban Administrative OkrugSelsoviet: Trubchevsky
- First mentioned: See text
- Elevation: 150 m (490 ft)

Population (2010 Census)
  - Total: 15,014
  - Estimate (2021): 13,287 (−11.5%)

Administrative status
  - Capital of: Trubchevsky District, Trubchevsky Urban Administrative Okrug

Municipal status
  - Municipal district: Trubchevsky Municipal District
  - Urban settlement: Trubchevskoye Urban Settlement
  - Capital of: Trubchevsky Municipal District, Trubchevskoye Urban Settlement
- Time zone: UTC+3 (MSK)
- Postal code: 242220
- OKTMO ID: 15656101001

Trubchevsk (Russian: Трубче́вск) is a town and the administrative center of Trubchevsky District in Bryansk Oblast, Russia, located about 95 kilometers (59 mi) south of the city of Bryansk, the administrative center of the oblast. Population: 13,287 (2021 census); 15,014 (2010 census); 16,342 (2002 census); 16,301 (1989 Soviet census).

== History ==
An old Severian town, Trubchevsk was first mentioned as Trubetsk in East Slavic manuscripts describing the events of 1164 and 1183, although the locally 975 is regarded as the year of its foundation. At that early period, it was variously called Trubech (Трубечь), Trubetsk (Трубецк), Trubchesk (Трубческ), or Trubezhsk (Трубежск).

The town is referred to in the great Old Russian poem, The Tale of Igor's Campaign. This poem calls for the princes of the various Slavic lands to join forces in resisting the invasions of the nomadic Cuman people. The poem also glorified the courage of the army of Vsevolod Svyatoslavich, the ruler of Kursk and Trubchevsk.

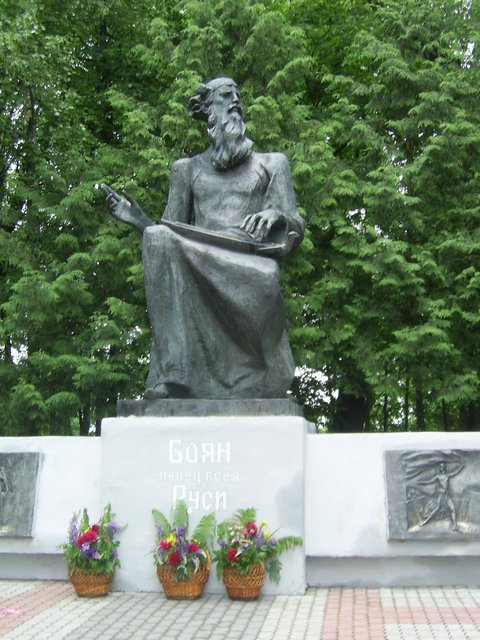
The Millennium Monument in Trubchevsk, representing Boyan playing a gusli

Originally a minor center of Severia, Trubchevsk had its own princes sporadically throughout the Middle Ages, in 1164–1196, 1202–1211, 1212–1240, 1378–1399, and finally in 1462–1503. From 1379, it was part of Lithuania. As of 1402, it was held by Duke Švitrigaila. In 1503, the town passed from Lithuania (by then within the Polish–Lithuanian union) to Muscovy. The last dynasty eventually settled in Moscow, where they became known as Princes Trubetskoy. In 1609, it was recaptured by the Polish–Lithuanian Commonwealth, within which it was administratively part of the Smolensk Voivodeship. In Polish it was known as Trubczewsk and Trubeck, and its Latinized name was Trubeckum. In 1644, it passed to Russia. In 1663 and 1667 it was besieged by the Poles and Tatars.

In 1873, the town had a population of 5,451. In the late 19th century, its inhabitants were mostly employed in flax processing and spinning, crafts, shipbuilding and trade. Three annual fairs and two weekly markets were held.

During World War II, Trubchevsk was occupied by the German Army from October 9, 1941 to September 18, 1943. Prior to the war, about 137 Jews lived in Trubchevsk. Most of the Jews were craftsmen, including cobblers and carpenters. By the time of the German occupation, more than half of the Jews fled or evacuated. The Jews from the Trubchevsk district were gathered in a Klub for 3 days and shot afterwards at the edge of the village. Their bodies were burnt. In total, according to the Soviet archives, 751 Soviet citizens perished due to bad treatment or as a result of shooting in the entire Trubchevsk district. Aside from Jews, mentally ill children and adults were exterminated as well. The Germans also operated a Nazi prison in the town.

== Administrative and municipal status ==
Within the framework of administrative divisions, Trubchevsk serves as the administrative center of Trubchevsky District. As an administrative division, it is incorporated within Trubchevsky District as Trubchevsky Urban Administrative Okrug. As a municipal division, Trubchevsky Urban Administrative Okrug is incorporated within Trubchevsky Municipal District as Trubchevskoye Urban Settlement.

== Architecture ==
There are very few notable buildings in the town. The main landmark is the 19th-century Trinity Cathedral, which incorporates some parts from its 16th-century predecessor.
