= Holy Trinity Cathedral (Lymanske) =

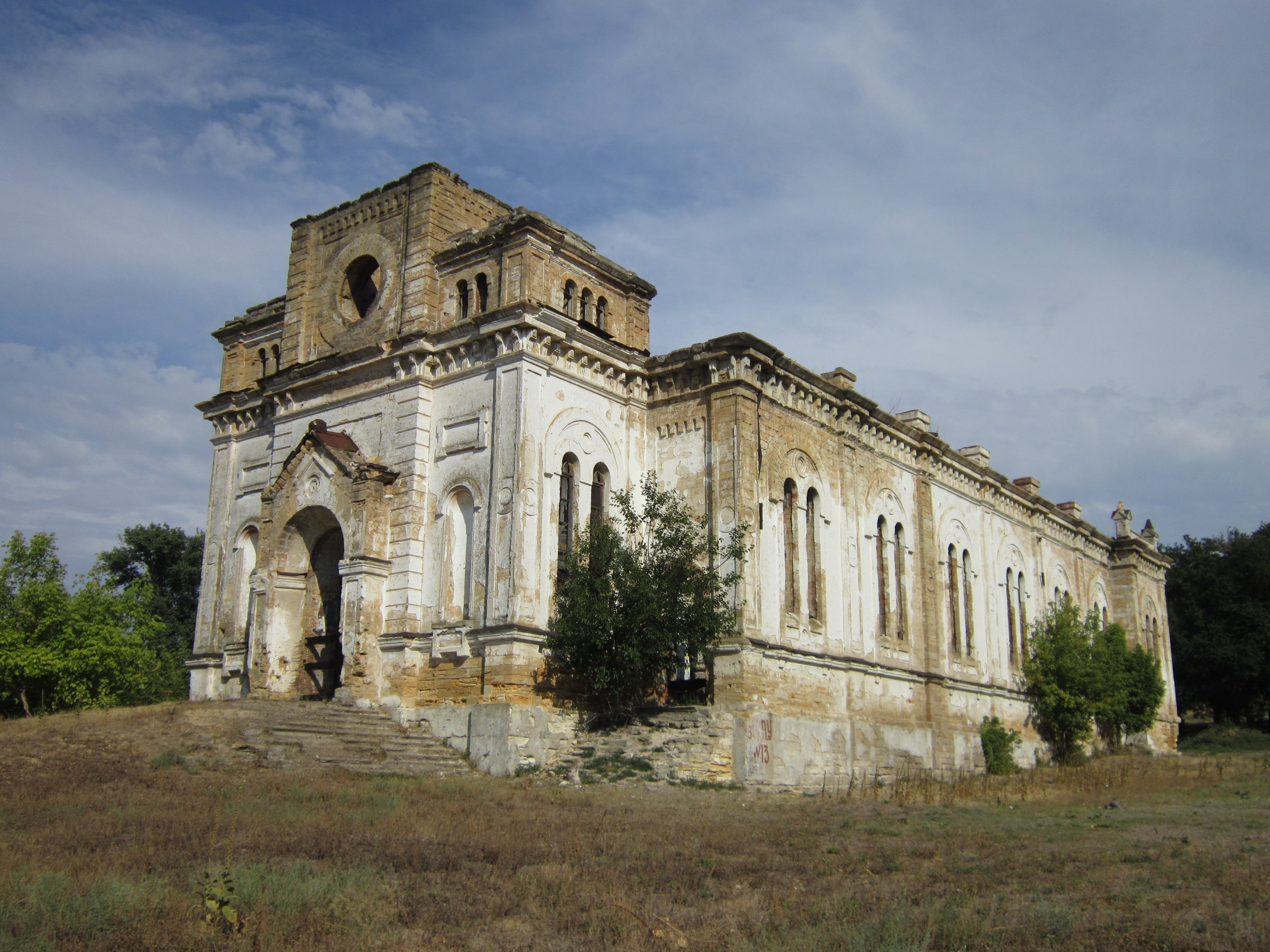
- The ruins of the church

- Location within Odesa Oblast Location within Ukraine
- 46°39′06″N 29°57′46″E
- Location: Lymanske
- Country: Ukraine
- Denomination: Roman Catholic

History
- Status: Ruin

Architecture
- Heritage designation: Memorial to the Cultural Heritage of Ukraine
- Designated: 2013 (#51-239-0002)
- Style: Romanesque Revival architecture
- Completed: 1892
- Closed: 1919, 1944

Holy Trinity Cathedral is a ruinate church in the German Catholic settlement of Kandel, now Lymanske in Rozdilna Raion, Odesa Oblast, Ukraine.

== Description ==
In 1892, Holy Trinity Cathedral was built in Neo-Roman style and consecrated by Bishop Anton Zerr. In contrast to the Cathedral of the Assumption of the Blessed Virgin Mary in nearby Selz, which was built with bricks, Holy Trinity Cathedral was built of limestone, a common material of the Black Sea region at that time. The church had a marble altar, and many sacred statues made by H. Ad. Vogl from Hall in Tirol near Innsbruck. The Stations of the Cross and Holy Tomb were by Ferdinand Stuflesser and other statues from St. Ulrich Gröden adorned the inside of the church.

== History ==
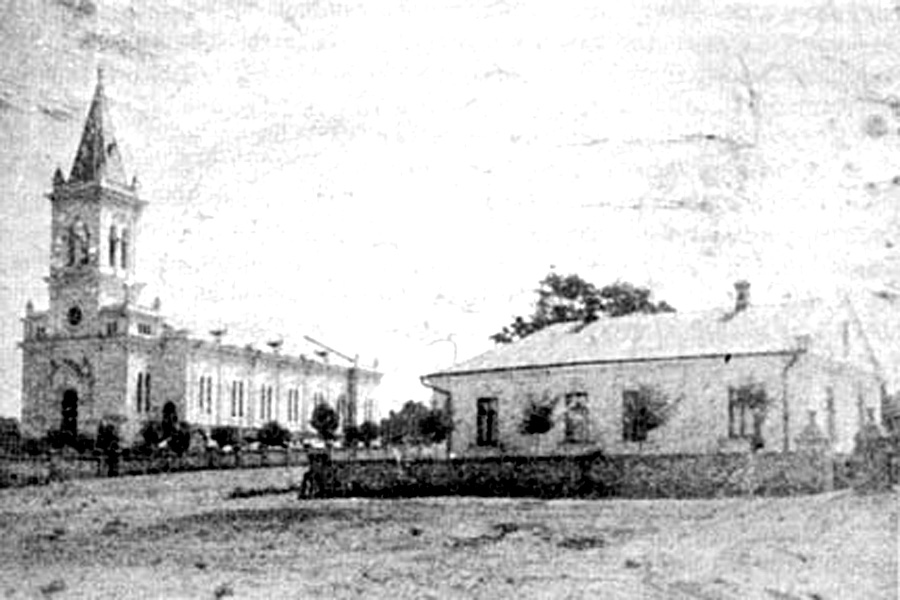
View of the church in 1934

In 1808, an order of Tsar Alexander I went forth "About providing assistance and headright to foreign sodbusters in Novorossiya." This order was the beginning of the second colonization wave by German settlers to Novorossiya (the modern region north of the Black Sea, Bessarabia and the Crimea). The colonists named their settlements according to the places left in their native land. In the territory of the modern Odesa oblast there were two colonial districts: Libentalskyi and Kuchurhanskyi. All colonies were planned according to traditional German villages, with a Lutheran or Catholic church, volost administration, and school in its center.

Kuchurhansklyi colonial district was founded in 1808 out of six colonies with an administrative center in Selz (urban-type settlement Lymanske). An administration center and the colony of Kandel were founded the same year by colonists from Alsace who were mainly Catholic. At that time in Kandel (in Soviet times renamed into Rybalske), there were nearly 3,000 settlers, and two schools.

=== Destruction ===
In the summer and autumn of 1919, German colonists from Odesa initiated the revolt against Prodrazvyorstka (food apportionment, the partition of the requested total amount as obligations from the suppliers) and mobilizing to the Soviet Red Army. After the troops of Denikin's volunteer army entered southern Ukraine, Germans formed a special colonial battalion, that weakened the strength of the Red army.

After the defeat of the revolt, the cathedral, as well as the Cathedral of the Assumption of the Blessed Virgin Mary in nearby Selz, was closed. During the Soviet period, it was used as grain storage, and later it suffered a fire that nearly destroyed it. The ceiling fell down, and today only walls and columns are left. It is currently used by the local orphanage for coal storage.

== Gallery ==
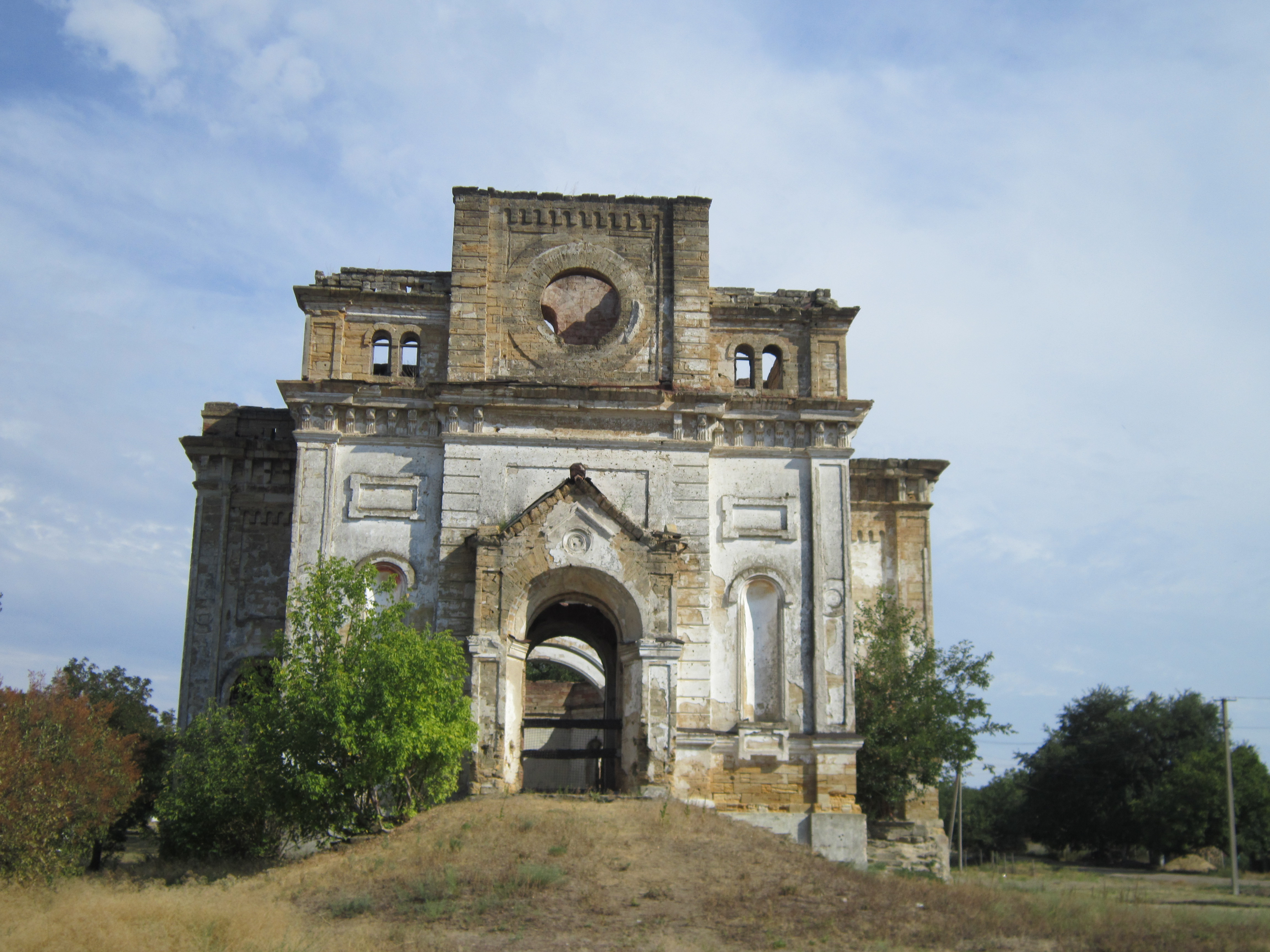
Front view of the church

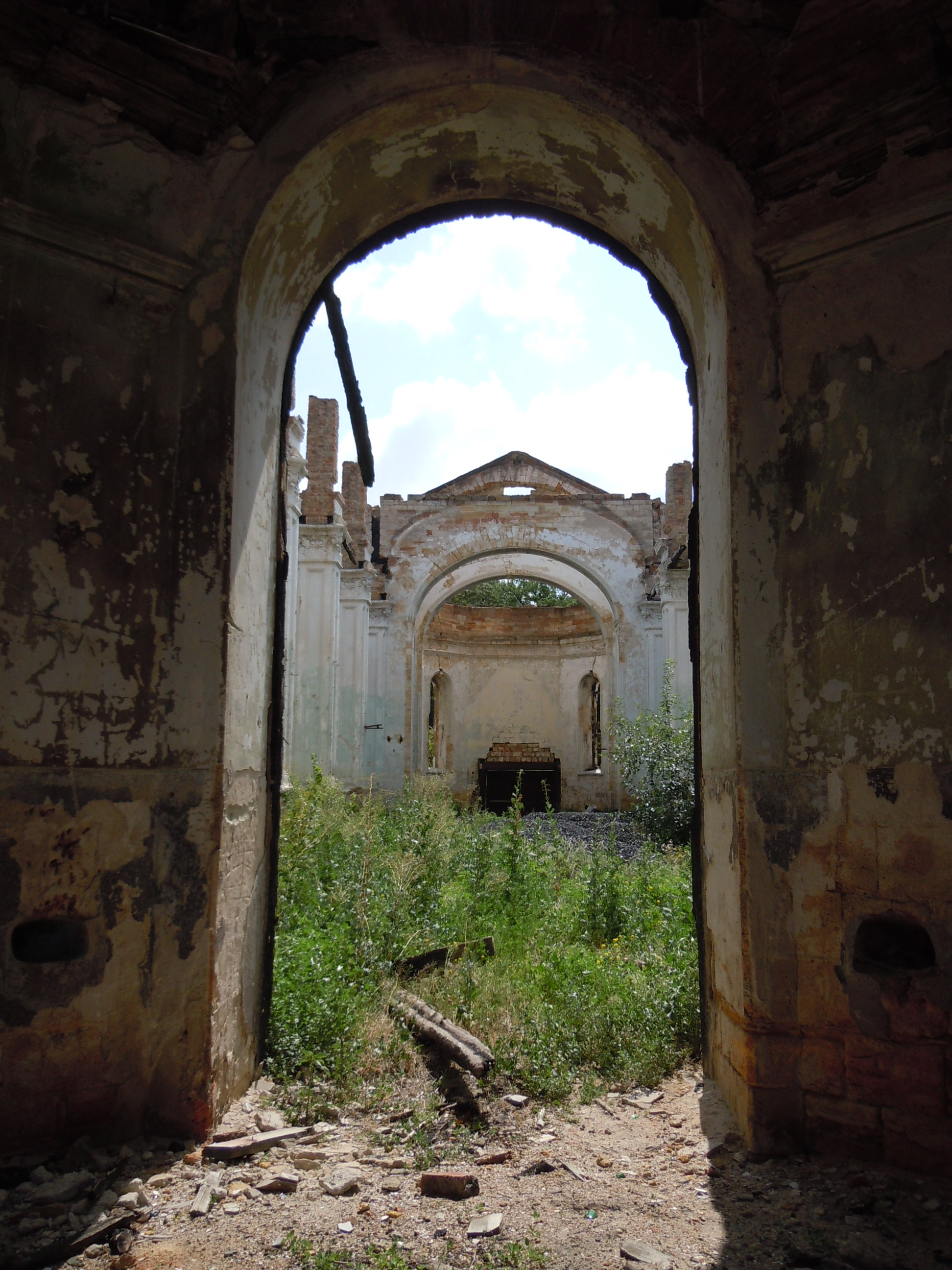
Entrance to the church

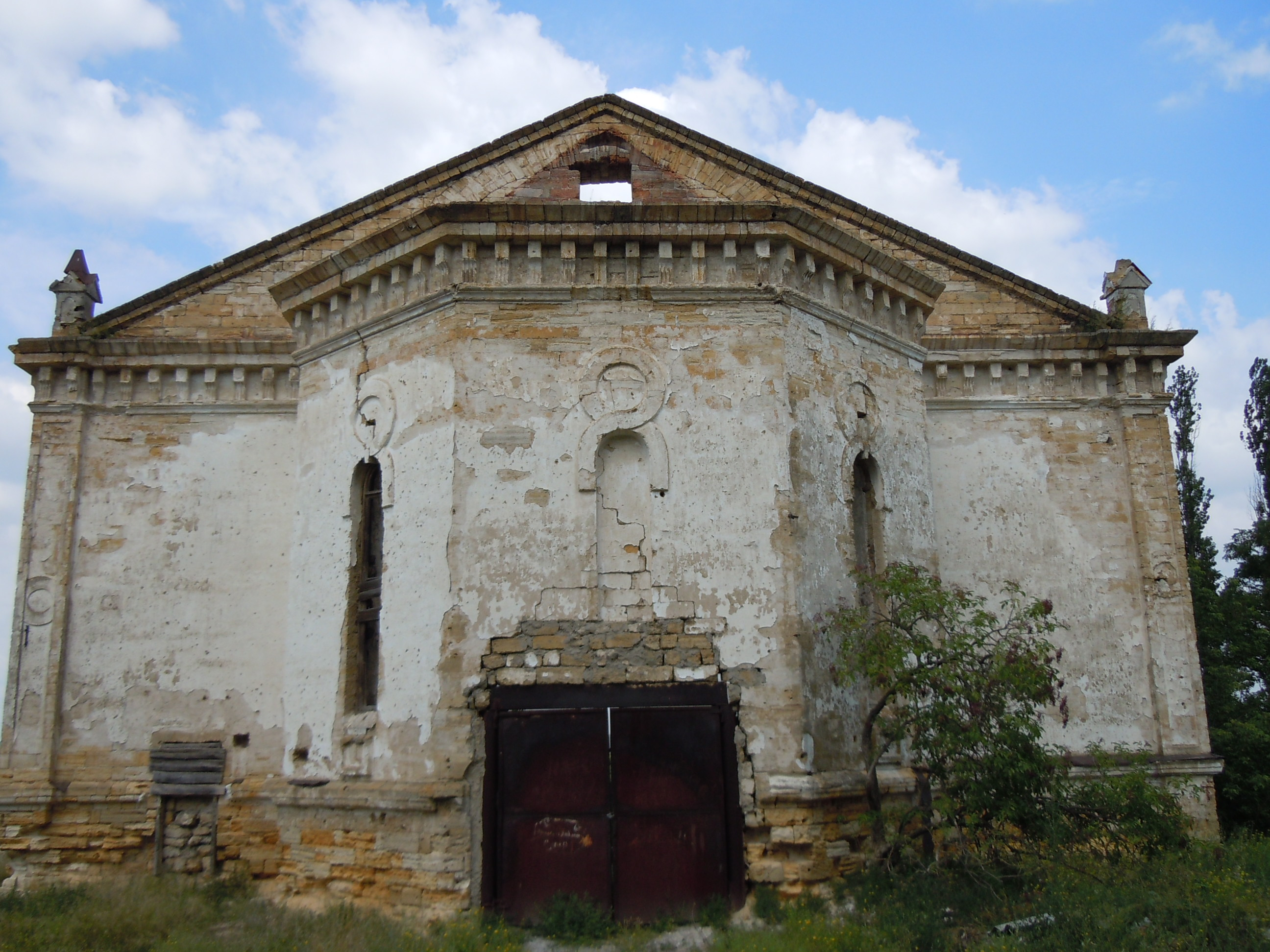
Back view of the church – the gates of the storage

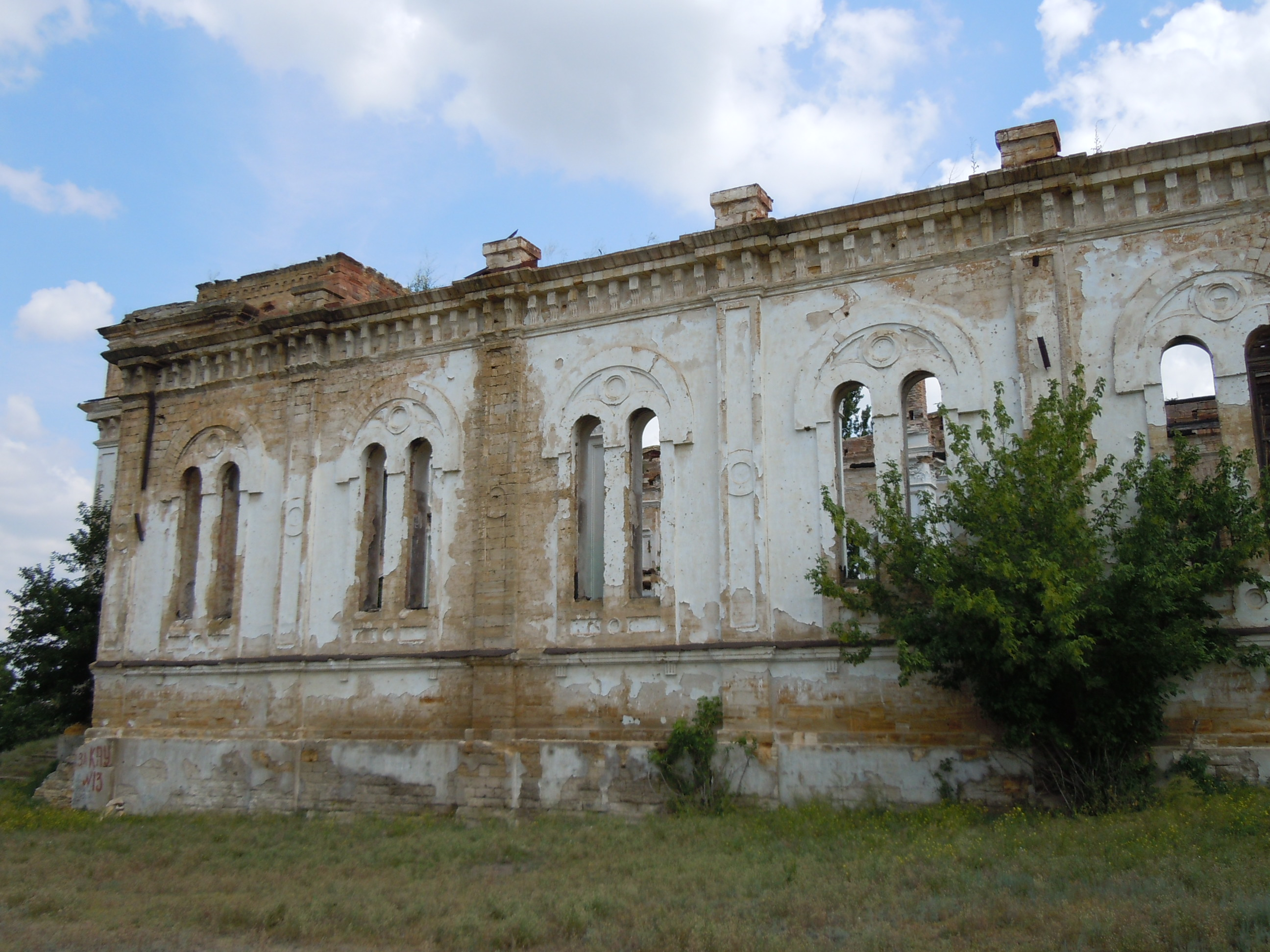
Side view of the church

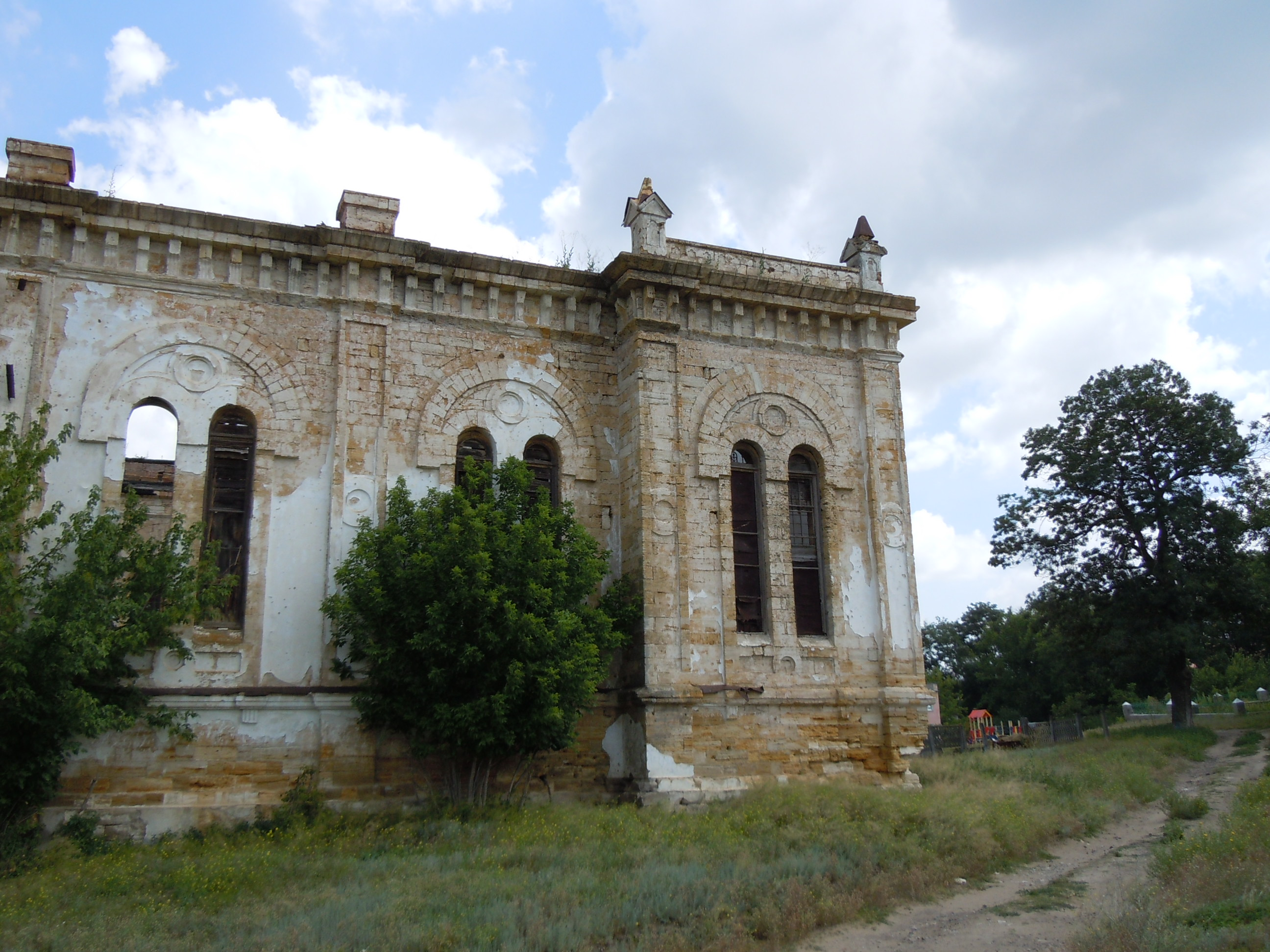
Side view of the church
