= Trinity Cathedral, Novosibirsk =

Russian Orthodox church in Russia

Trinity Cathedral Троицкий собор
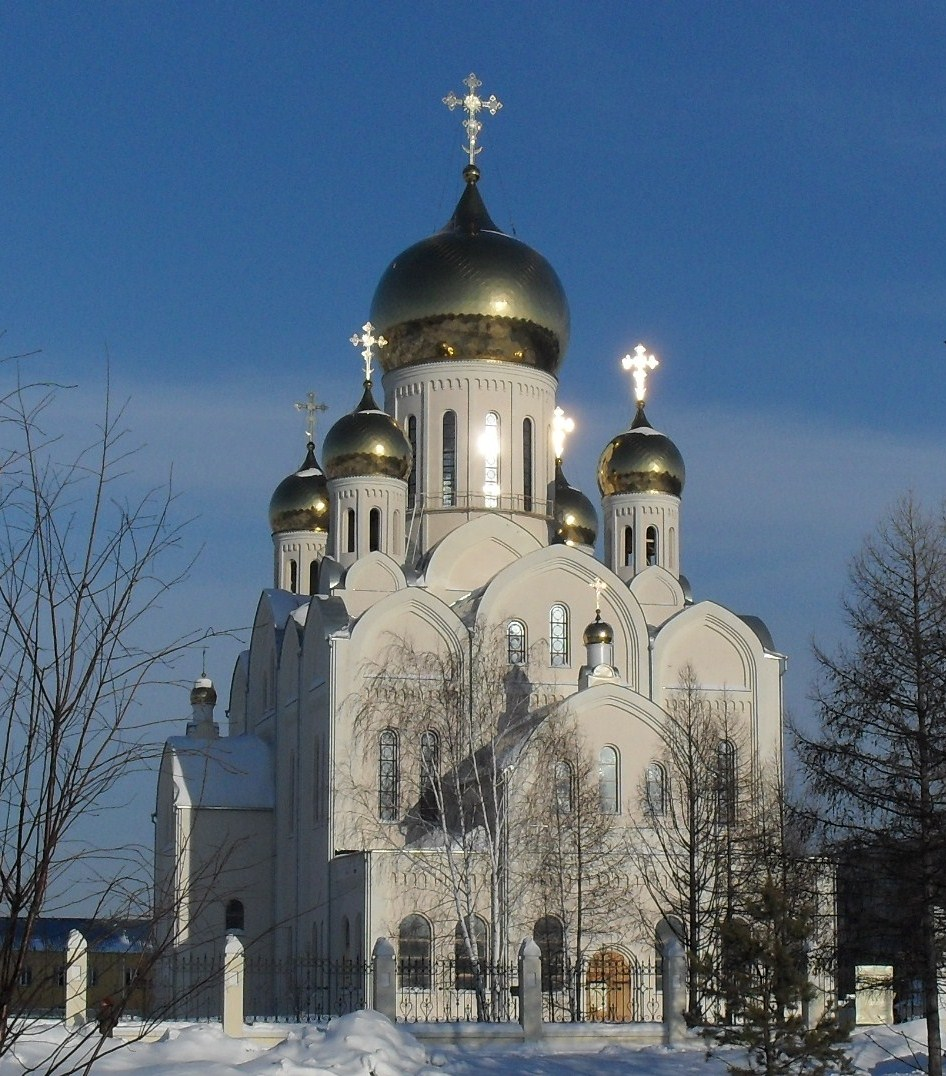

Religion
- Affiliation: Russian Orthodox

Location
- Location: Novosibirsk
- Interactive map of Trinity Cathedral; Троицкий собор

Trinity Cathedral (Russian: Троицкий собор) is a Russian Orthodox church in Leninsky City District of Novosibirsk, Russia.

== History ==
On August 24, 2013, the cathedral was consecrated by Patriarch Kirill.
