= Trinity Cathedral (Yekaterinburg) =

Holy Trinity Cathedral
- Свято-Троицкий собор
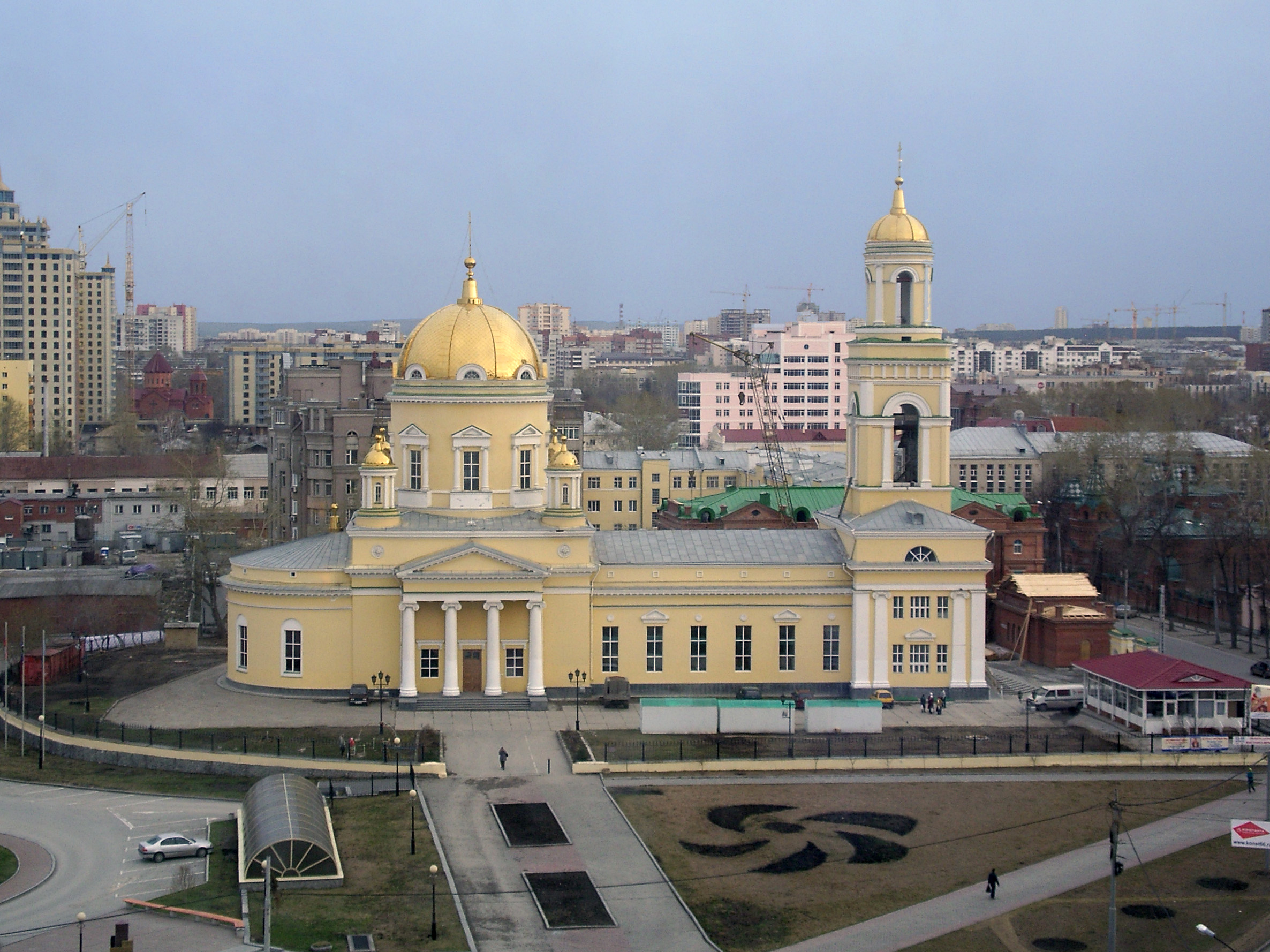
- Interactive map of the Holy Trinity Cathedral area

General information
- Type: Orthodox church
- Architectural style: Classical
- Location: Yekaterinburg, Sverdlovsk Oblast, Russia
- Coordinates: 56.8274°N 60.6144°E
- Completed: 1839 (partial); 1852 (final)

Design and construction
- Architect: M.P. Malakhov

Holy Trinity Cathedral, sometimes shortened to Trinity Cathedral, is an Orthodox church in Yekaterinburg, Russia. Built between 1818 and 1839, the building served in several roles throughout the history of Imperial Russia, the Soviet Union, and Russian Federation. The church is currently managed by the Metropolitanate of Yekaterinburg.

== Description ==
The plan for the construction of what would become the Holy Trinity church began in the early 19th-century. The church was heavily promoted by the Old Believers. This association with the Old Believers (who were viewed as being outside the main Russian Orthodox Church) led to complications during the building of the church. Construction on the church began in 1824, with the church being designed in the Classicalist style by prominent architect M.P. Malakhov. Notable among the patrons of the construction project was the Ryazanovs, a family of merchants and miners based in Yekaterinburg. One member of the family, Yakim Ryazanov, was particularly notable for his role in getting the church built. Though he was a member of the Old Believers, Yakim decided in 1838 to change the churche's denomination from the Old Believers to the common Orthodox church. The first section of the church was completed in 1839 and the building was consecrated that same year.

Upon its partial completion, the new church proved to be popular and drew many worshipers. To accommodate this increased number of practitioners a second chapel was built in 1849. Construction also continued on the main church, which was completed in 1852, and the church's bell tower was added in 1854. At the time of its completion, the church's towers were among the tallest structures in Yekaterinburg and have been cited as an example of early high-rise development in the city. The church remained popular for the rest of the 19th century, with 1,945 parishioners being registered at the church in 1899.

Following the Russian Revolution and the subsequent formation of the Soviet Union, the church began to be negatively affected by the new government's Atheistic policies, which included the closure of many religious institutions. The Holy Trinity church was eventually ordered to close by the Yekaterinburg government and the building was eventually vacated. The former church would go on to host a cinema and a coat factory during the Soviet era, with many parts of the building sustaining damage. In 1930 the church's original domes and belfry were demolished. An effort by the local palace of culture to maintain the building began in the 1970s.

In 1994 negotiations began to restore the church to the recently the Orthodox diocese of Yekaterinburg, eventually resulting in the Orthodox church regaining the church in 1995. The first religious service in the new church was conducted in 1996, and further efforts to restore the building began that same year. The cathedral remains in use to the present day.
