= Trubchevsk Cathedral =

Cathedral in Trubchevsk, Russia

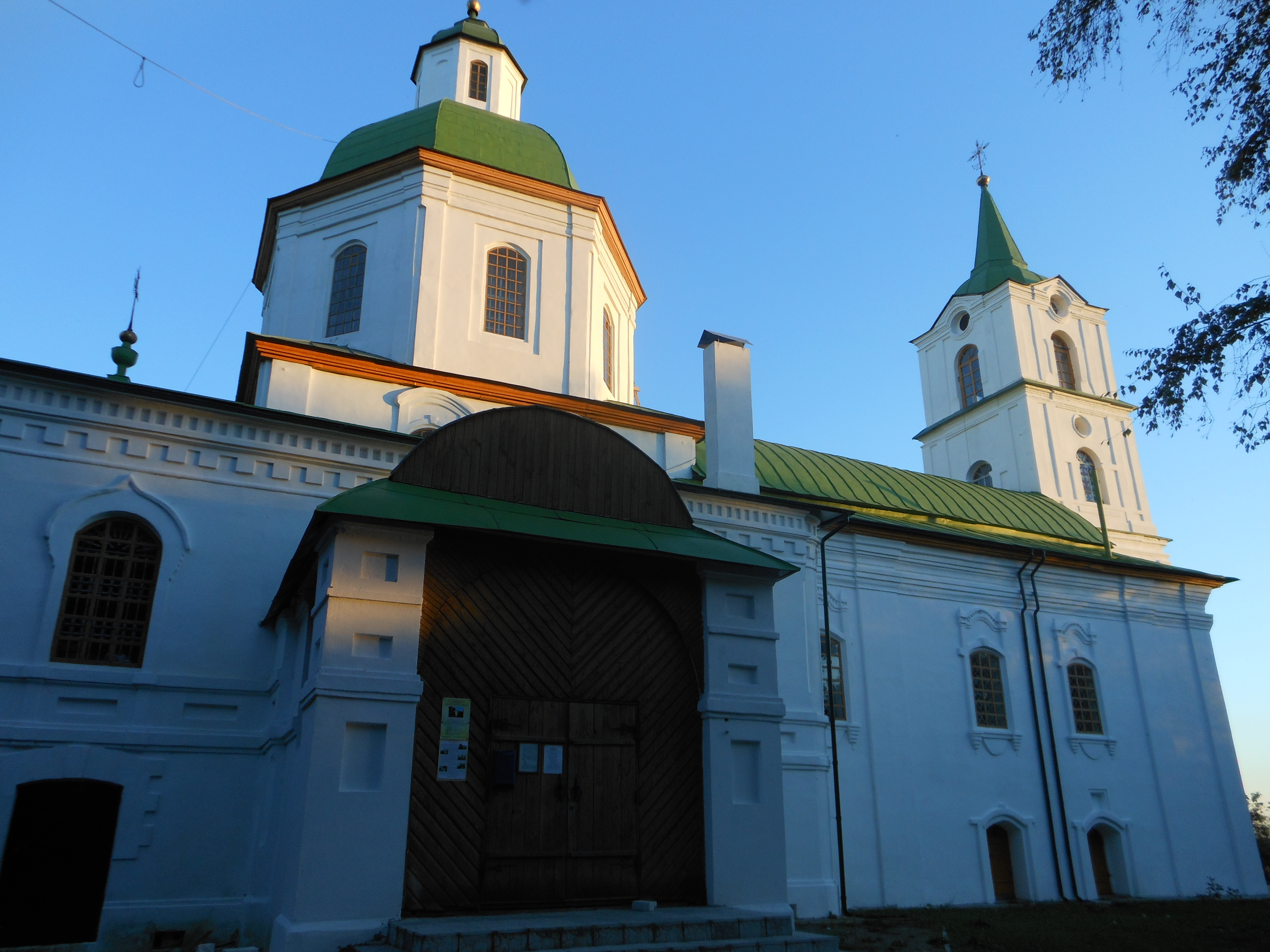
Trinity Cathedral, Trubchevsk

The Trinity Cathedral in Trubchevsk, Russia, was built in the 18th century on a hill rising above the river Desna. It incorporates the foundations of an earlier church, built in the beginning of the 16th century by the Princes Troubetzkoy, and it subsequently became the site of their family tomb. The present cathedral was built at the end of the 18th century over the old building. The belfry was added at the beginning of the 19th century.

Excavations in 1971 under the cathedral have revealed a rock temple of the 12th century.
