= Trubchevsky District =

Trubchevsky District Трубчевский район (Russian)
- District
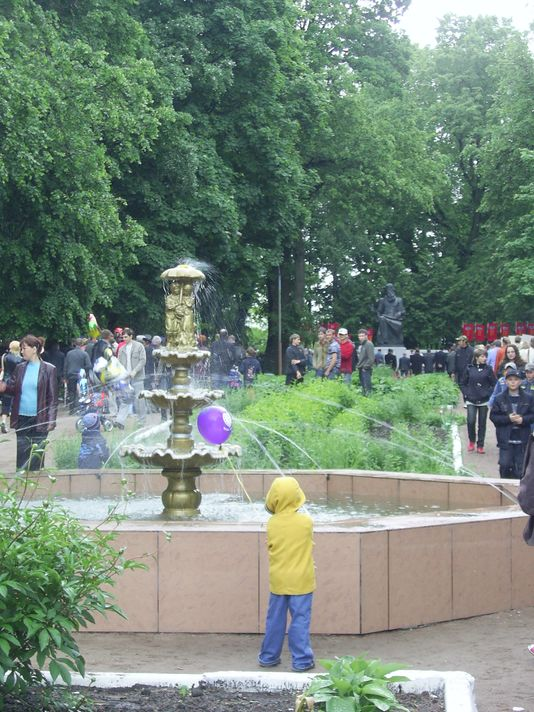
- Turbchev Park

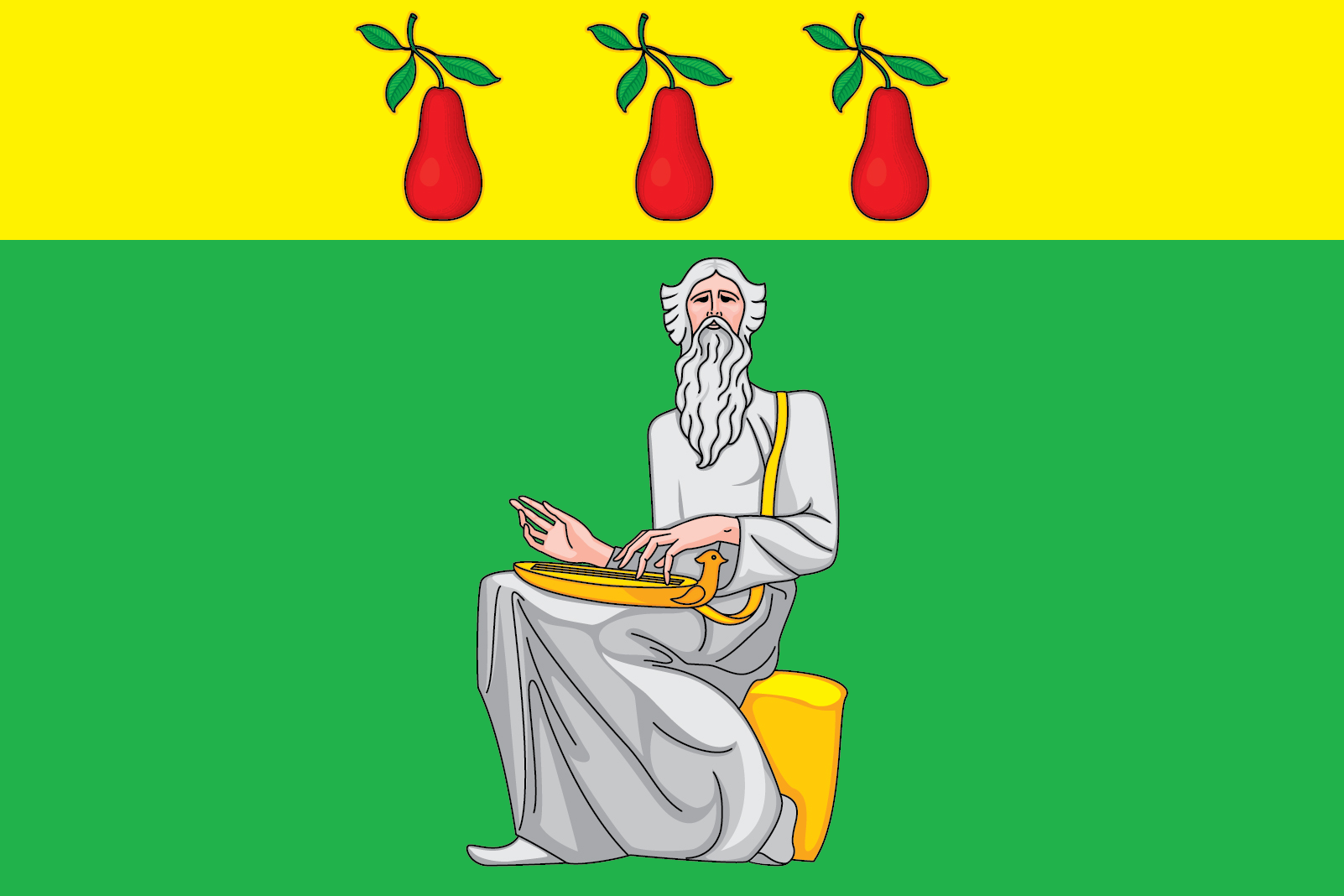
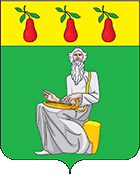
- Flag Coat of arms
- Location of Trubchevsky District in Bryansk Oblast
- Coordinates: 52°35′N 33°46′E
- Country: Russia
- Federal subject: Bryansk Oblast
- Administrative center: Trubchevsk

Area
  - Total: 1,843.2 km^{2} (711.7 sq mi)

Population (2010 Census)
  - Total: 37,002
  - Density: 20.075/km^{2} (51.994/sq mi)
  - Urban: 57.6%
  - Rural: 42.4%

Administrative structure
  - Administrative divisions: 1 Urban administrative okrugs, 1 Settlement administrative okrugs, 6 Rural administrative okrugs
  - Inhabited localities: 1 cities/towns, 1 urban-type settlements, 122 rural localities

Municipal structure
  - Municipally incorporated as: Trubchevsky Municipal District
  - Municipal divisions: 2 urban settlements, 6 rural settlements
- Time zone: UTC+3 (MSK)
- OKTMO ID: 15656000
- Website: http://www.trubech.ru/

Trubchevsky District (Russian: Трубче́вский райо́н) is an administrative and municipal district (raion), one of the twenty-seven in Bryansk Oblast, Russia. It is located in the south of the oblast. The area of the district is 1,843.2 square kilometers (711.7 sq mi). Its administrative center is the town of Trubchevsk. Population: 33,491 (2021 census); 37,002 (2010 census); 41,690 (2002 Census); 45,000 (1989 Soviet census). The population of Trubchevsk accounts for 39.7% of the district's total population.
