= Co-Cathedral Basilica of the Most Holy Trinity, Chełmża =

Coordinates: 53.1864°N 18.6140°E

Co-Cathedral Basilica of the Most Holy Trinity
- Chełmża Cathedral
- Polish: Bazylika Konkatedralna Trójcy Świętej
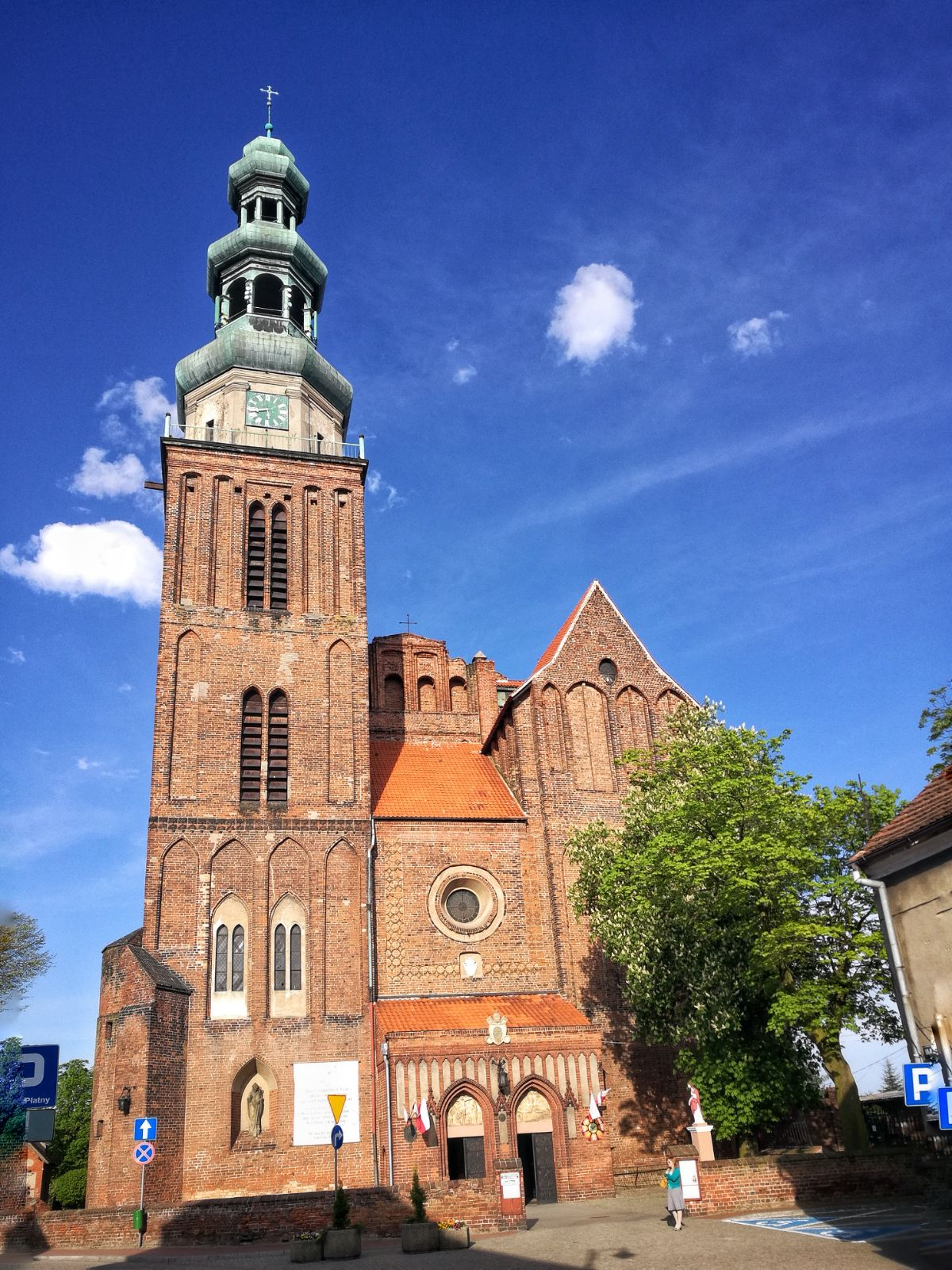
- The Cathedral in 2018
- Co-Cathedral Basilica of the Most Holy Trinity
- Location: Chełmża
- Country: Poland
- Denomination: Roman Catholic Church

The Co-Cathedral Basilica of the Most Holy Trinity (Polish: Bazylika Konkatedralna Trójcy Świętej) also called Chełmża Cathedral is a religious building belonging to the Catholic Church located in the city of Chełmża, Poland.

The church since 1994 has been the co-cathedral or alternate cathedral of the Diocese of Toruń (Dioecesis Thoruniensis or Diecezja Toruńska) and received the status of Minor Basilica in 1982. It was built as a Cathedral of the ancient Diocese of Chelmno.

Located on a lakeshore slope, it was built in stages from 1251 until the second quarter of the fourteenth century. During the construction of the cathedral, the structure was twice destroyed (1267 and 1286) during Prussian invasions. In 1422 there was a fire in the church as a result of the Lithuanian-Tatar raids and in 1950 a fire destroyed the ceilings of the vaults of the nave, the dome, and the central arch beam. Reconstruction in the years 1968-1971 restored the church to its original appearance.

== See also ==
- Roman Catholicism in Poland
- 17th-century Western domes

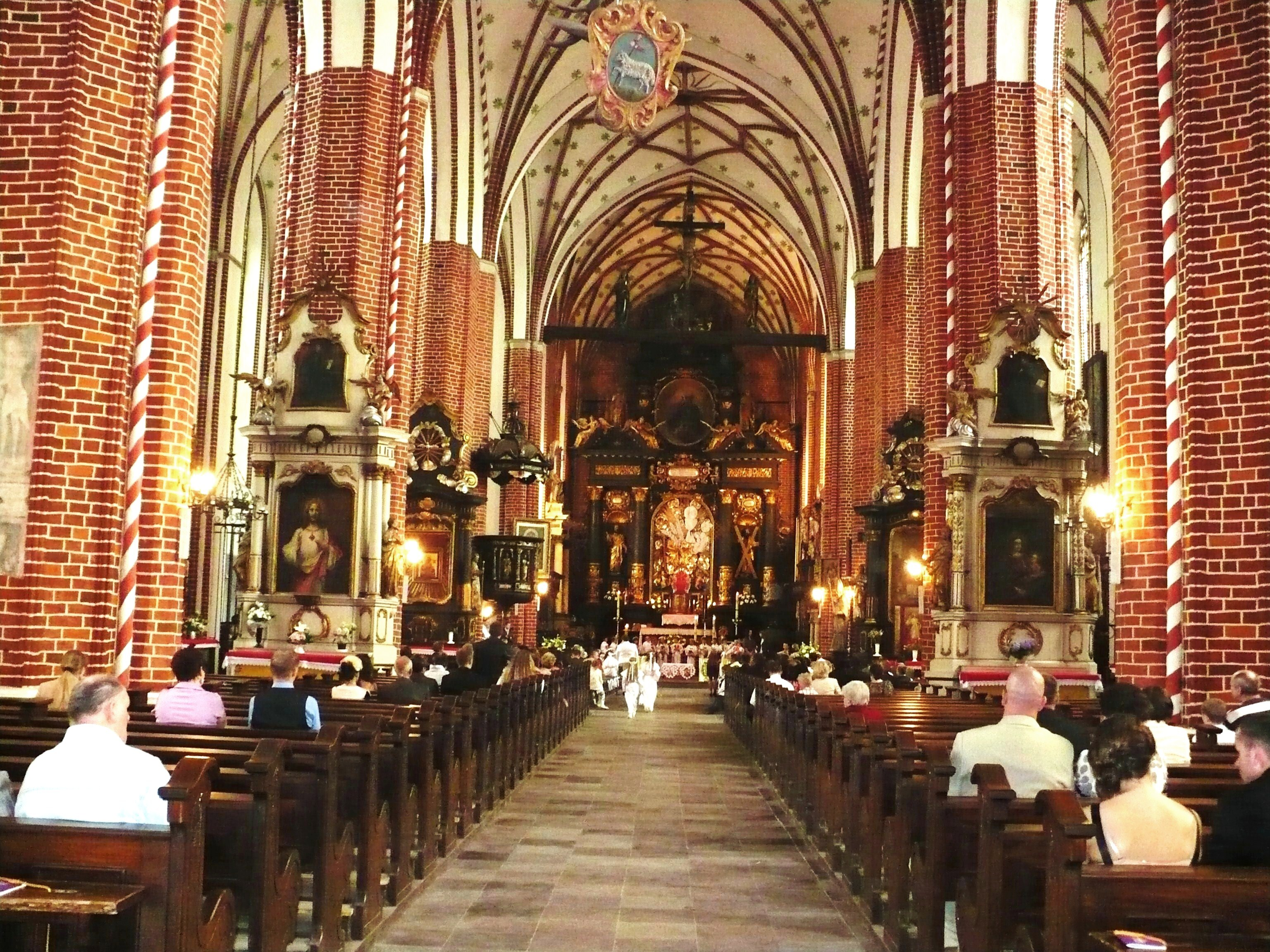
Internal view
