= Yeletskyi Monastery =

Monastery in Chernihiv, Ukraine

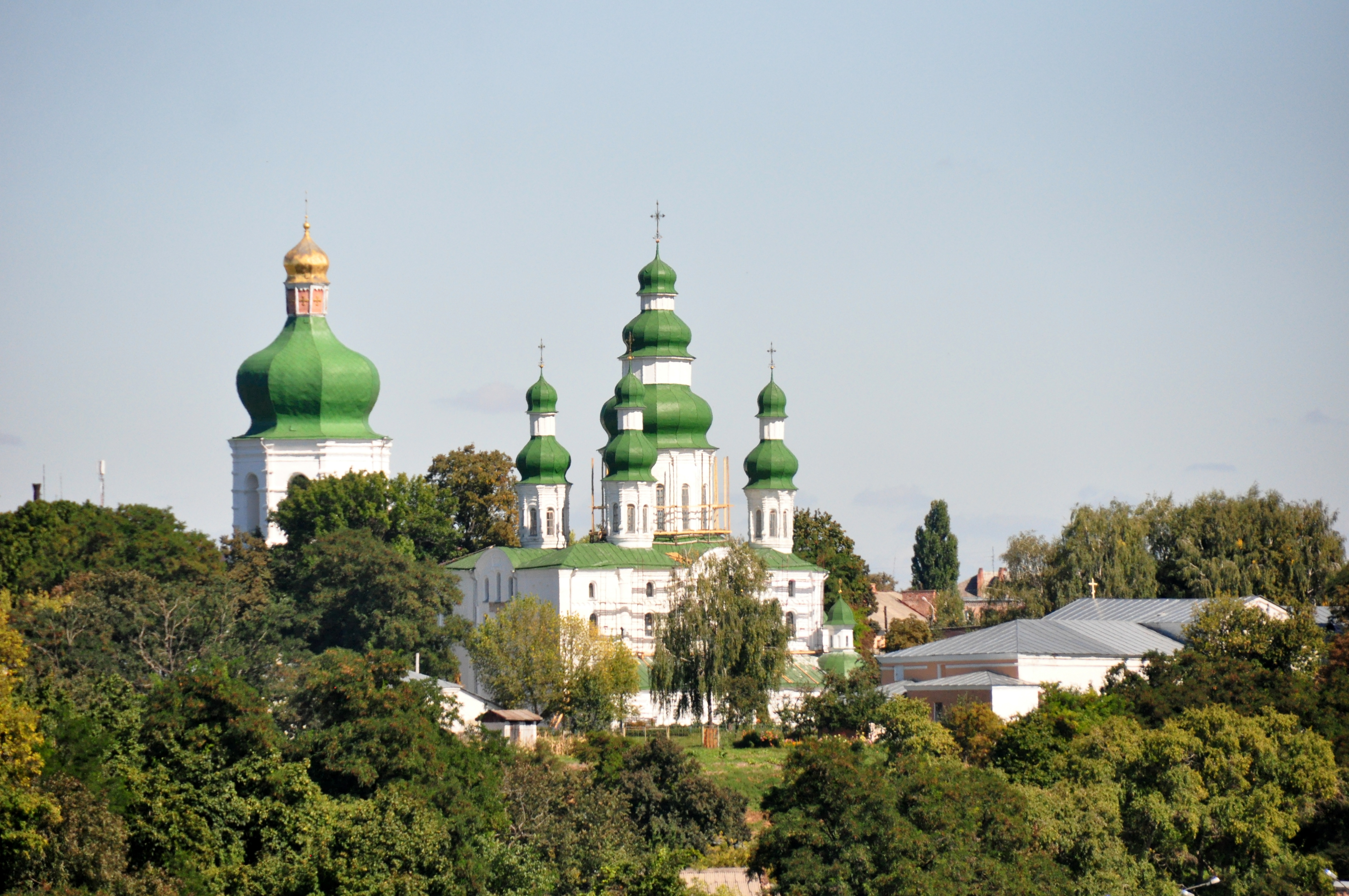
- Monastery ensemble

Religion
- Affiliation: Eastern Orthodox Church
- Province: Chernihiv Oblast
- Ecclesiastical or organisational status: Cathedral
- Status: Active, museum

Location
- Location: 1 Kniazia Chornoho Street Chernihiv, Chernihiv Oblast, Ukraine 14000,
- Interactive map of Yeletskyi Monastery
- Coordinates: 51°29′7.94″N 31°17′41.6″E

Architecture
- Type: Katholikon
- Style: Kievan Rus' (original cathedral), Ukrainian Baroque
- Completed: 12th century
- Dome: 5

Website
- eleckymon.church.ua

Immovable Monument of National Significance of Ukraine
- Official name: Комплекс споруд Єлецького монастиря (Complex of buildings of the Yeletskyi Monastery)
- Type: Architecture
- Reference no.: 250043-Н

The Yeletskyi Dormition Monastery (Ukrainian: Успенський Єлецький монастир) is a former Orthodox monastery in the city of Chernihiv, Ukraine, located on the elevated right bank of the Desna River, between Dytynets Park and the Trinity Monastery.

== History ==
=== Foundation and early history ===
The Yeletskyi Monastery is one of the oldest in Ukraine. It was founded in 1060 on one of the slopes of the Boldyni Hory by Prince Sviatoslav II of Kiev at the site of a miraculous sign – according to legend, an icon of the Mother of God was noticed on one of the fir trees. This gave rise to its name.

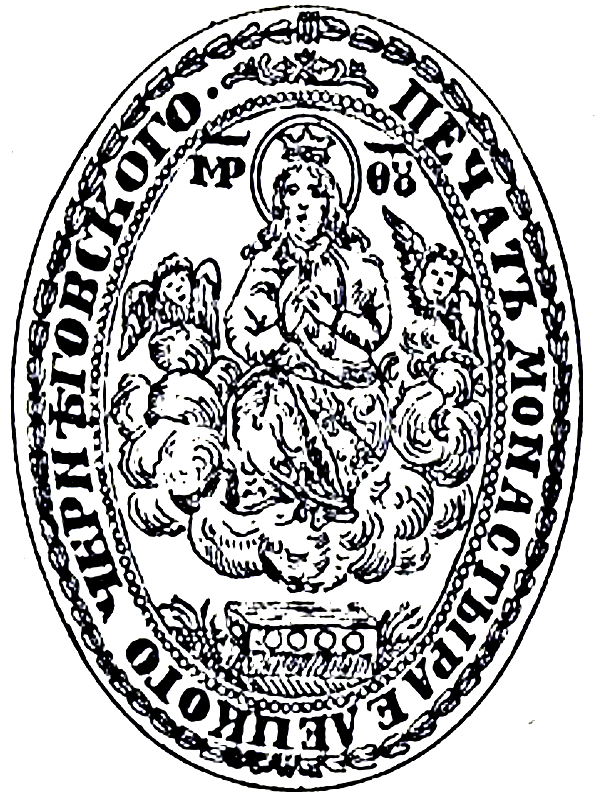
Seal of the Yeletskyi Monastery

In 1239 the monastery was destroyed during the Mongol invasion. After that, a period of decline of the city and the entire region began, which lasted almost 200 years. During the reign of Prince Ivan Mozhaisky, restoration work began on the monastery and other shrines of Chernihiv. At that time, in particular, the Dormition Cathedral was renovated, cells were built, and a large bell on two pillars was installed.

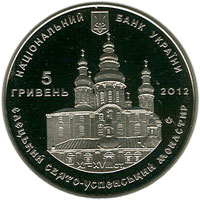
NBU commemorative coin dedicated to Yeletskyi Monastery (obverse)

In 1579 it was destroyed during the Polish-Lithuanian siege. In 1611 the holy place remained empty again after the capture of Chernihiv by the Polish led by Samuel the Ermine. A part of the main dome of the Dormition Cathedral collapsed and the ancient Yeletskyi icon of the Virgin Mary was lost. In 1623 it was restored during the rule of the Polish–Lithuanian Commonwealth and transferred to the Greek Catholic Church. In 1649, following the Khmelnytsky Uprising, it was captured by the Orthodox. It was completely rebuilt in the Ukrainian Baroque style under the presidency of Archimandrite Joanikiy Galyatovsky in 1669–1688. In 1786, by order of the Russian Empress of Catherine the Great, it was deprived of its land holdings.

From 1618 to 1648 the “Polish” period began in the life of the monastery. The monastery and all that belonged to it passed to the Eastern Catholic Churches, who restored the walls and domes of the temple. Here, in 1646, the first book of Chernigov was printed: The Pearl of Great Price. In 1921 the Soviet authorities closed the monastery and from that moment began the saddest page in its history. The new government tried to use the monastery premises for various institutions. Of course, there was no question of preserving the monastery as an art monument. From 1944 to 1964 it was part of the Chernihiv Regional Philharmony.

=== Modern history ===
An icon of the Yeletskyi Mother of God is held in the Dormition Cathedral of the Yeletskyi Monastery, which has become famous in modern times. The monastery books record numerous miracles performed by her in the 19th century. The icon happily survived Soviet rule and numerous wars and, in 1999, was transferred to the Historical Museum. From 1992 to 2024 it was leased to the Moscow Patriarchate under the name of the Holy Dormition Convent of Yeletskyi, in honor of the main church of the Dormition of the Virgin Mary. In the spring of 2022, Russia bombed the city of Chernihiv and with it the Yeletskyi Dormition Monastery. The facades of the monastery walls, the gate and the bell tower of the 17th century, as well as the dome drums of the 11th–17th centuries were damaged.

== Buildings and structures ==
The architectural ensemble of the Yeletskyi Dormition Monastery includes:

- The Dormition Cathedral – the main temple (2nd half of the 12th century);
- The tomb church of Yakov Kindratovich Lyzohub, 1689 – built on the southern side of the Dormition Cathedral by order of Yeukhim Lyzohub, son of Colonel Ya. K. Lyzohub. Later it was used as a library and a sacristy. It consists of 2 rooms separated by a vestibule;
- The gate bell tower of 1670–1675 – the oldest high-rise building in Chernihiv, its height is 36 m. Built on the site of an older wooden bell tower;
- The refectory Church of Peter and Paul of the 17th century above the Yeletskyi Caves.
- Cells of the same period – the oldest brick residential building preserved in Left-Bank Ukraine. Consists of three buildings: ward, eastern and southwestern;
- Brick fence;
- Ruins of the 18th century abbot's house;
- A wooden residential house, known as the house of Archimandrite Feodosii Uglichky, built in 1688 – the oldest wooden building preserved in Left-Bank Ukraine;
- House of Theodosius of Chernihiv.

== Transport connections ==
From the Chernihiv–Ovruch railway and Central Bus Station by trolleybus no. 3 and buses no. 8, 11, 12, 16, 43 to the "Scuola no. 20" stop, then walk for about 1 km.

== Gallery ==
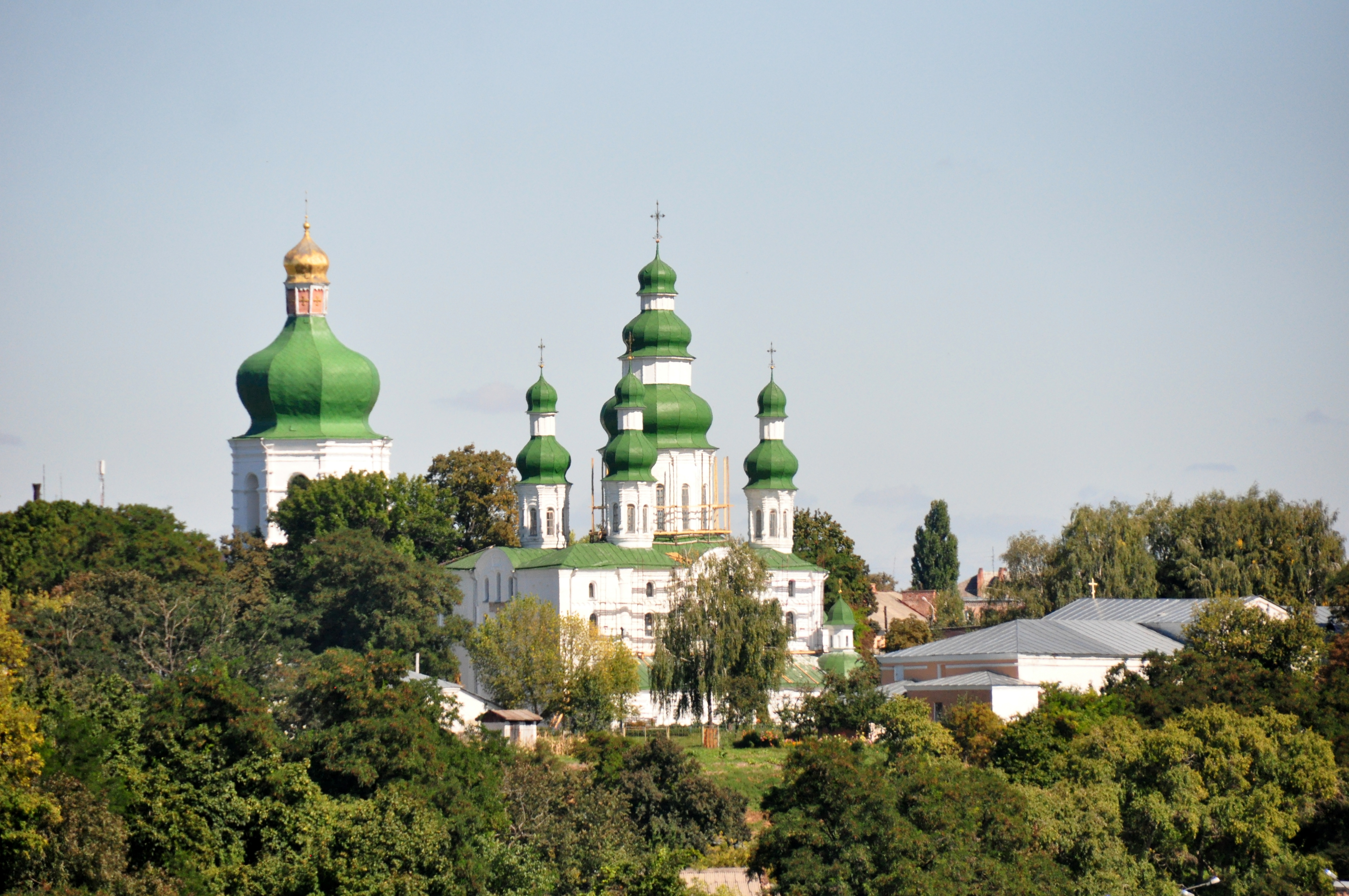
View of Yeletskyi Monastery

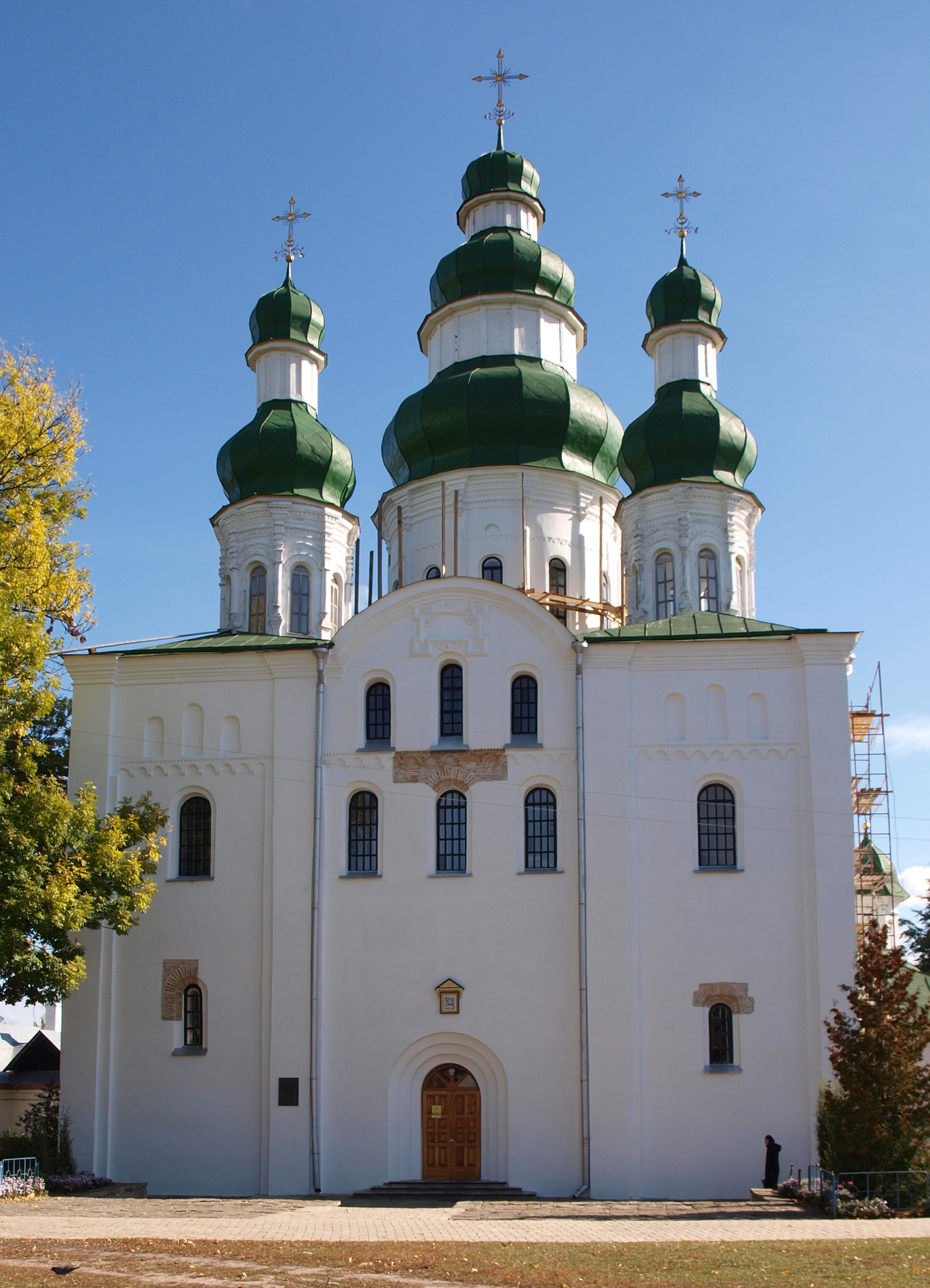

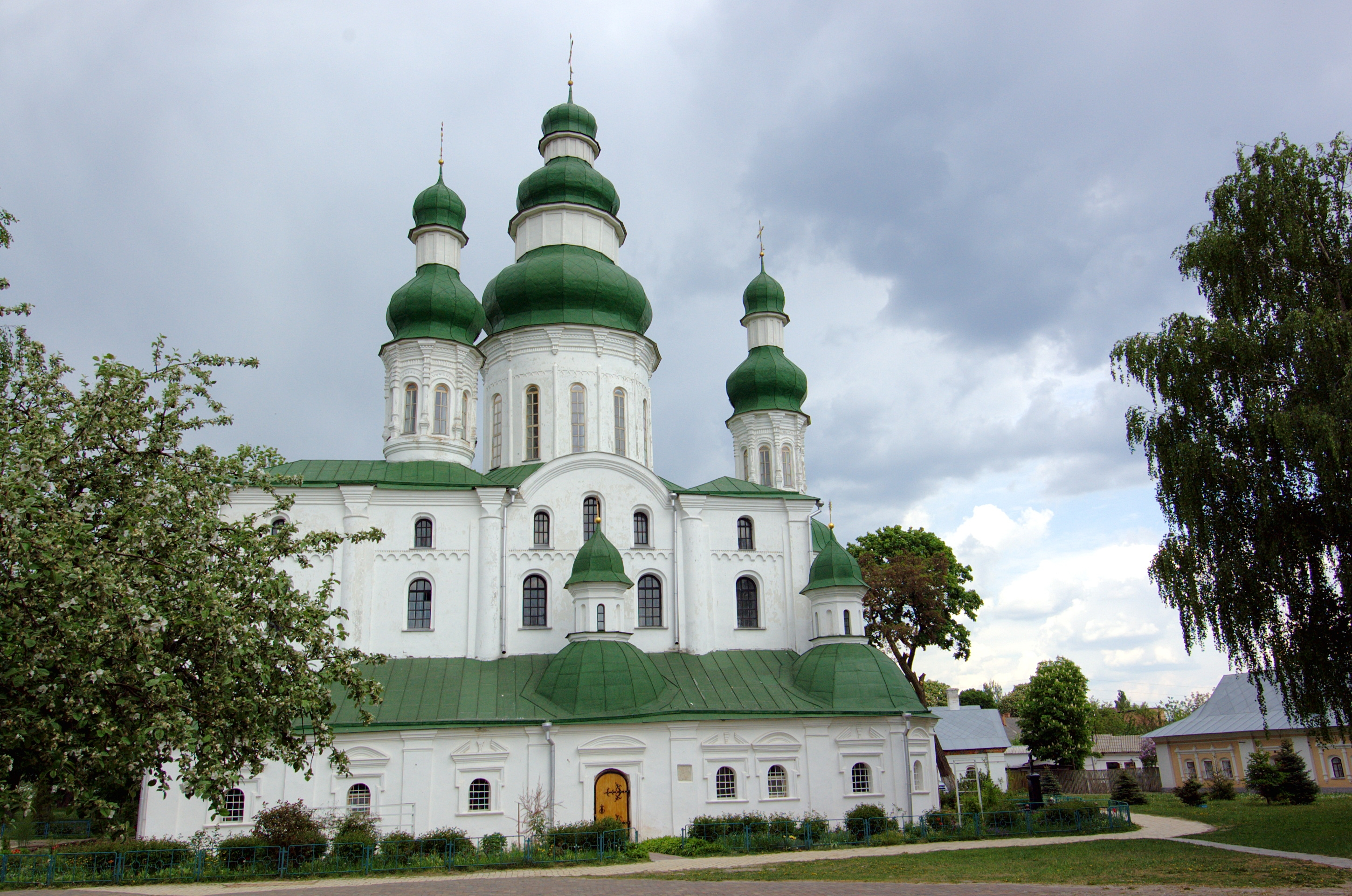

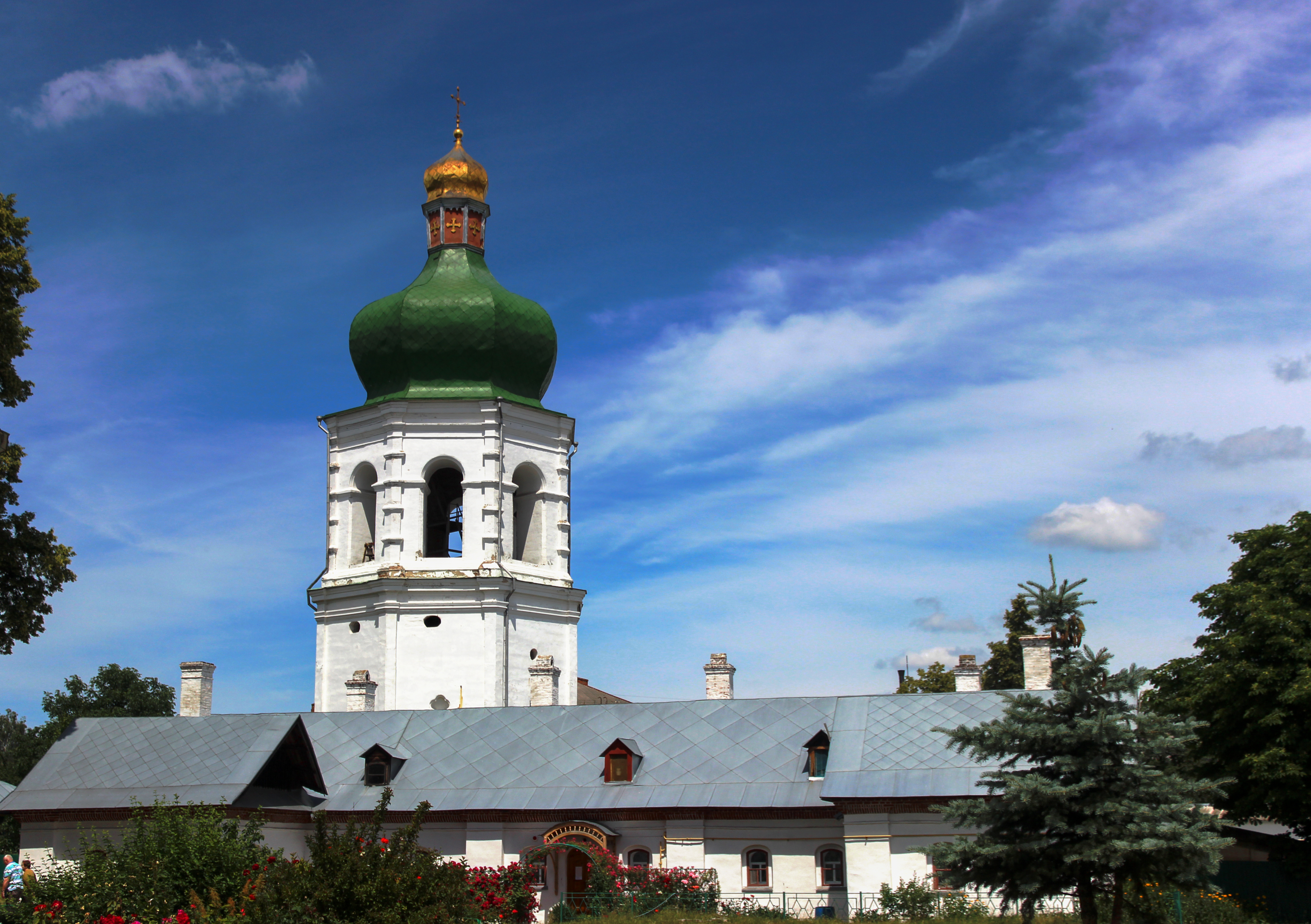

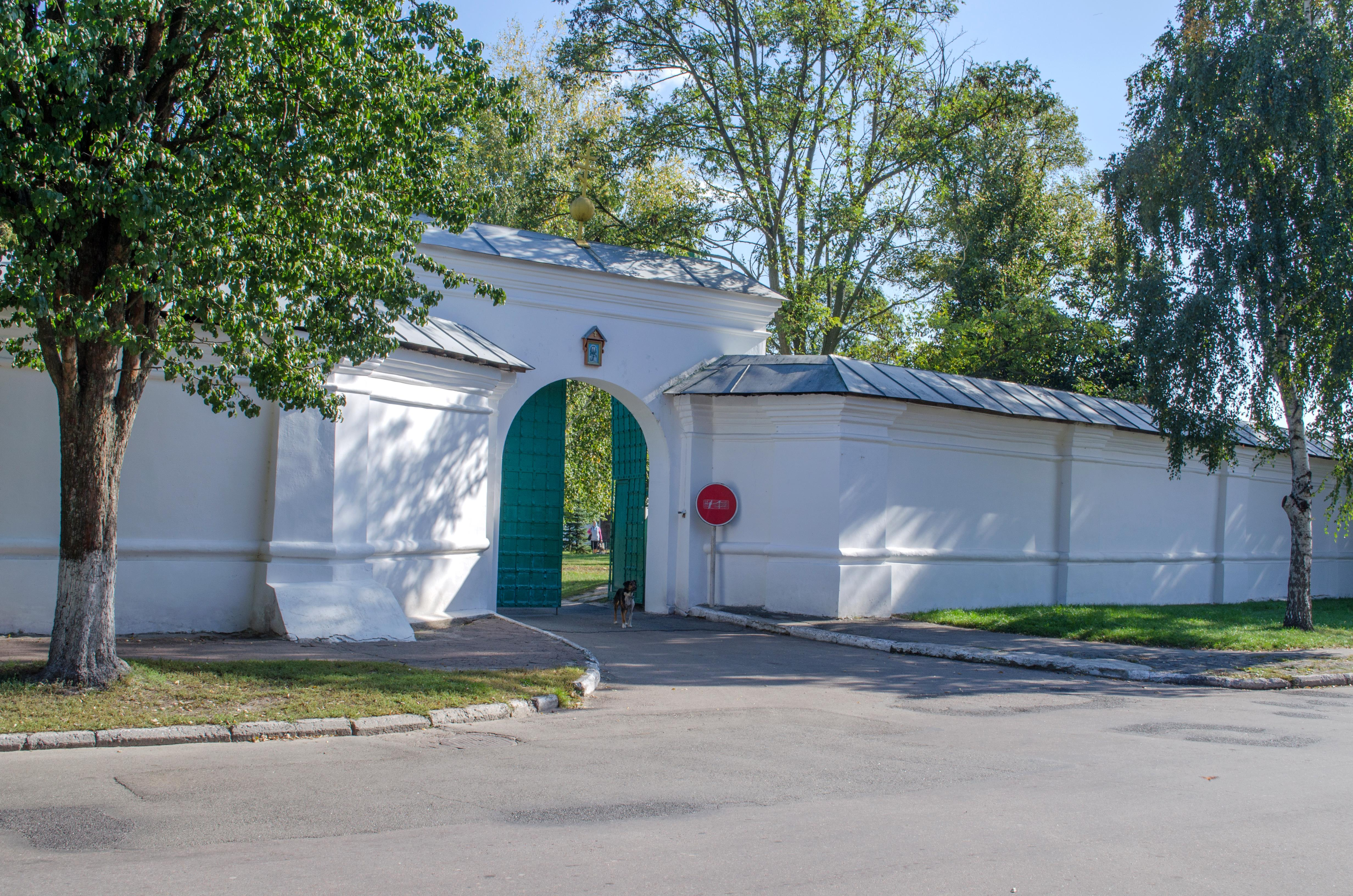

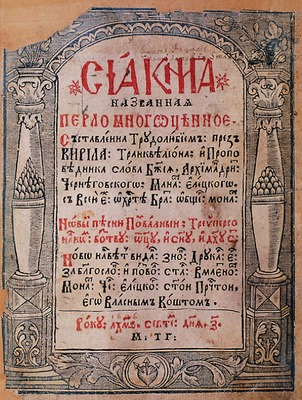

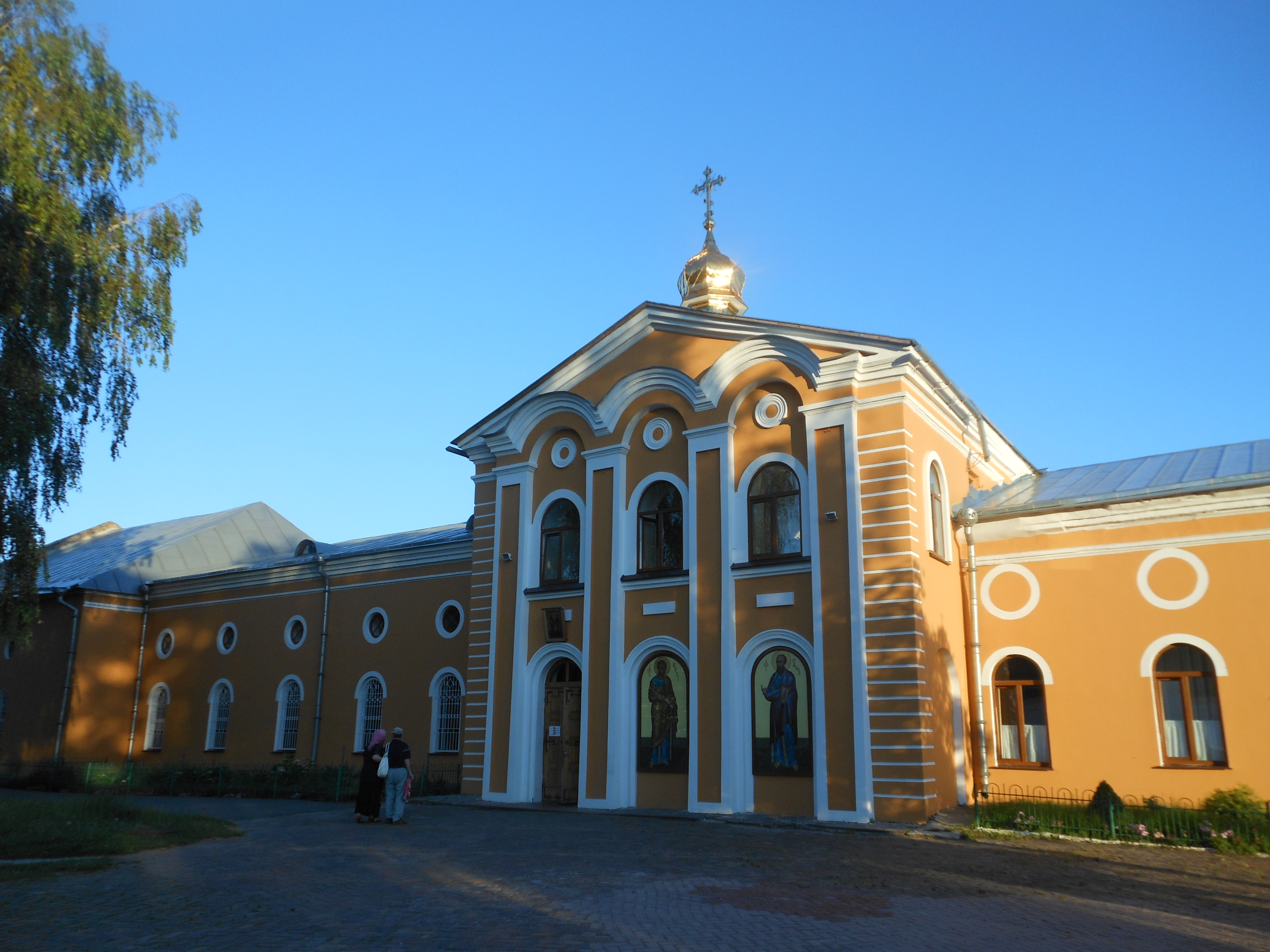
Saints Peter and Paul Church

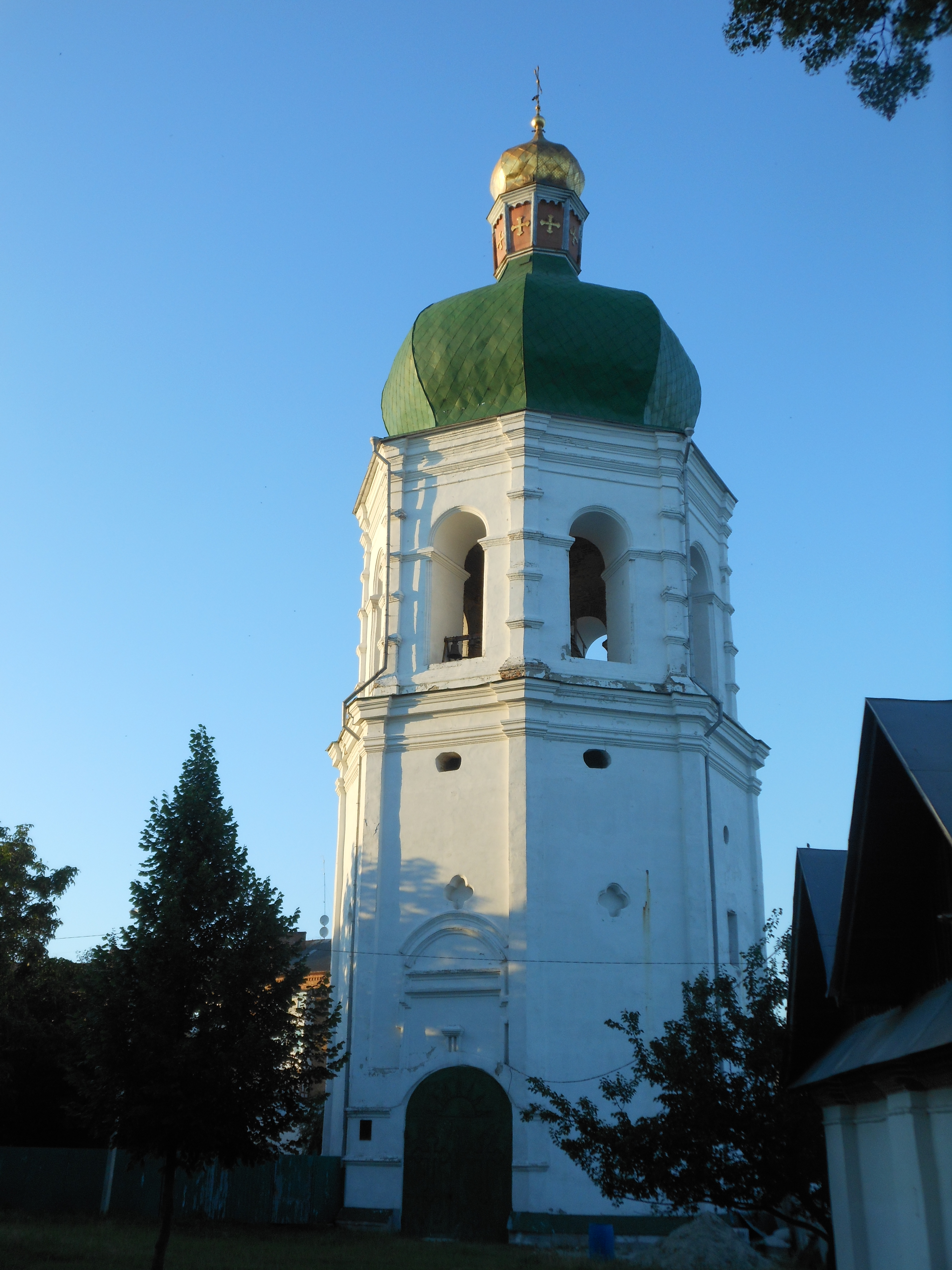

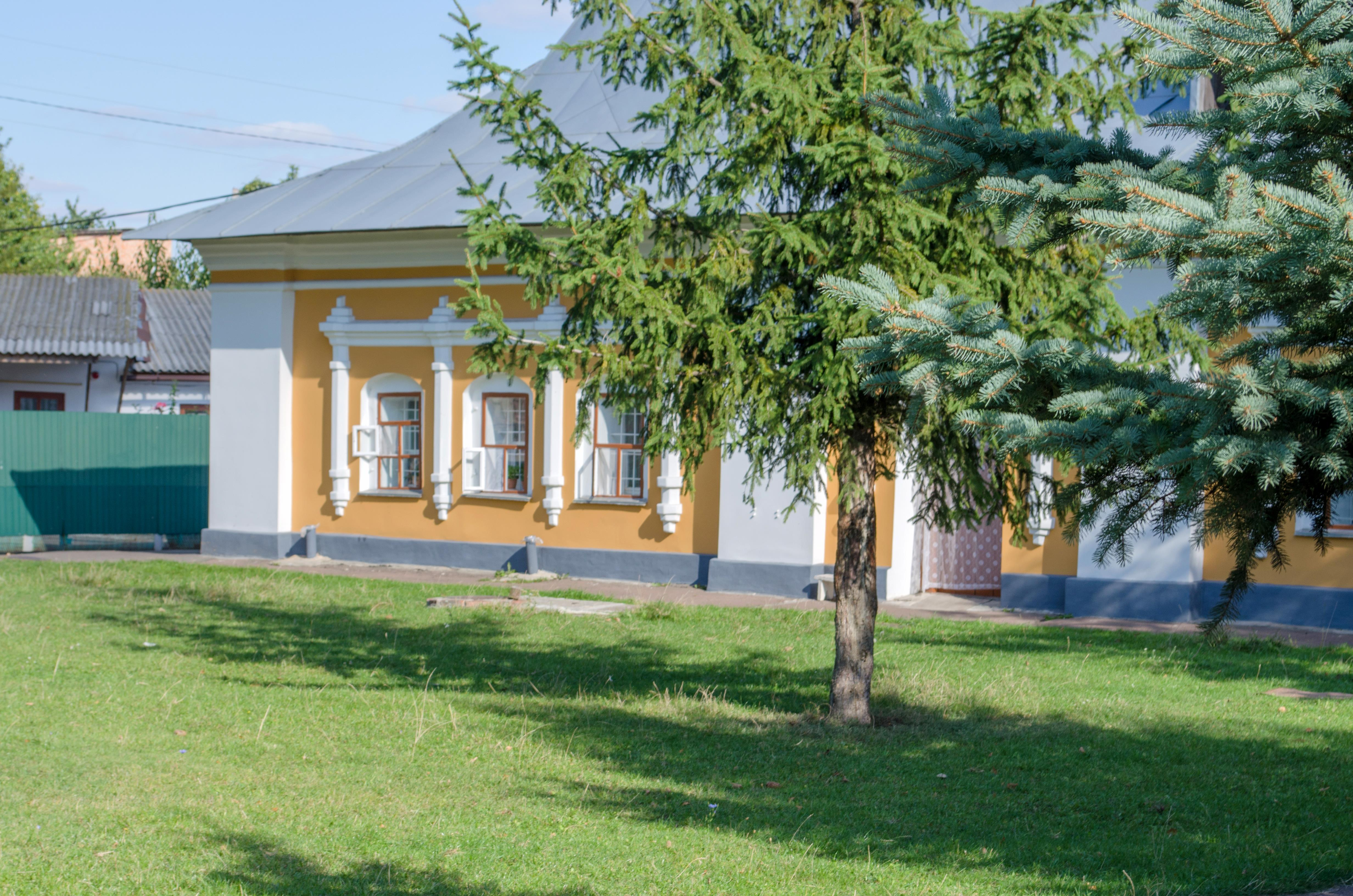

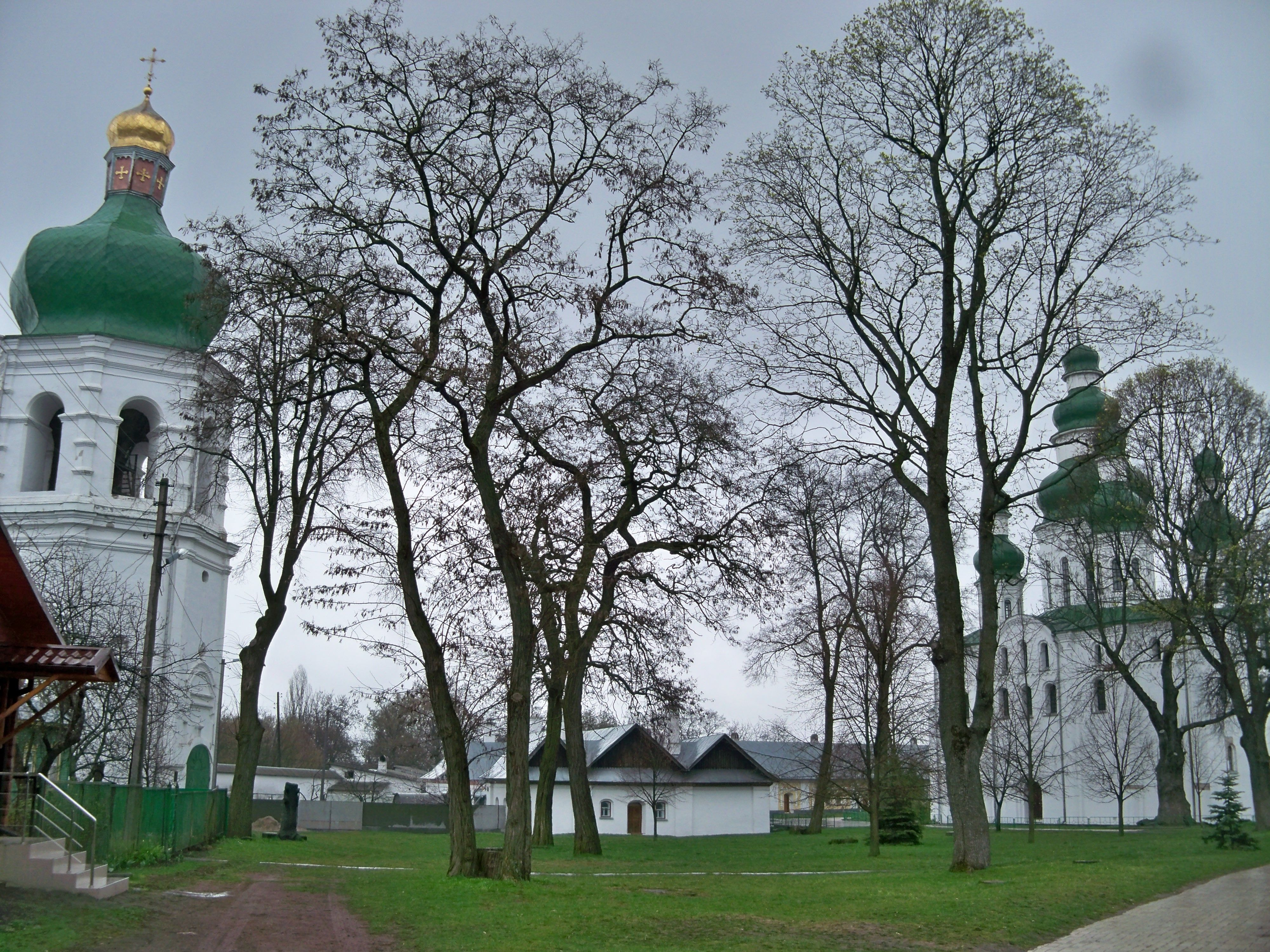

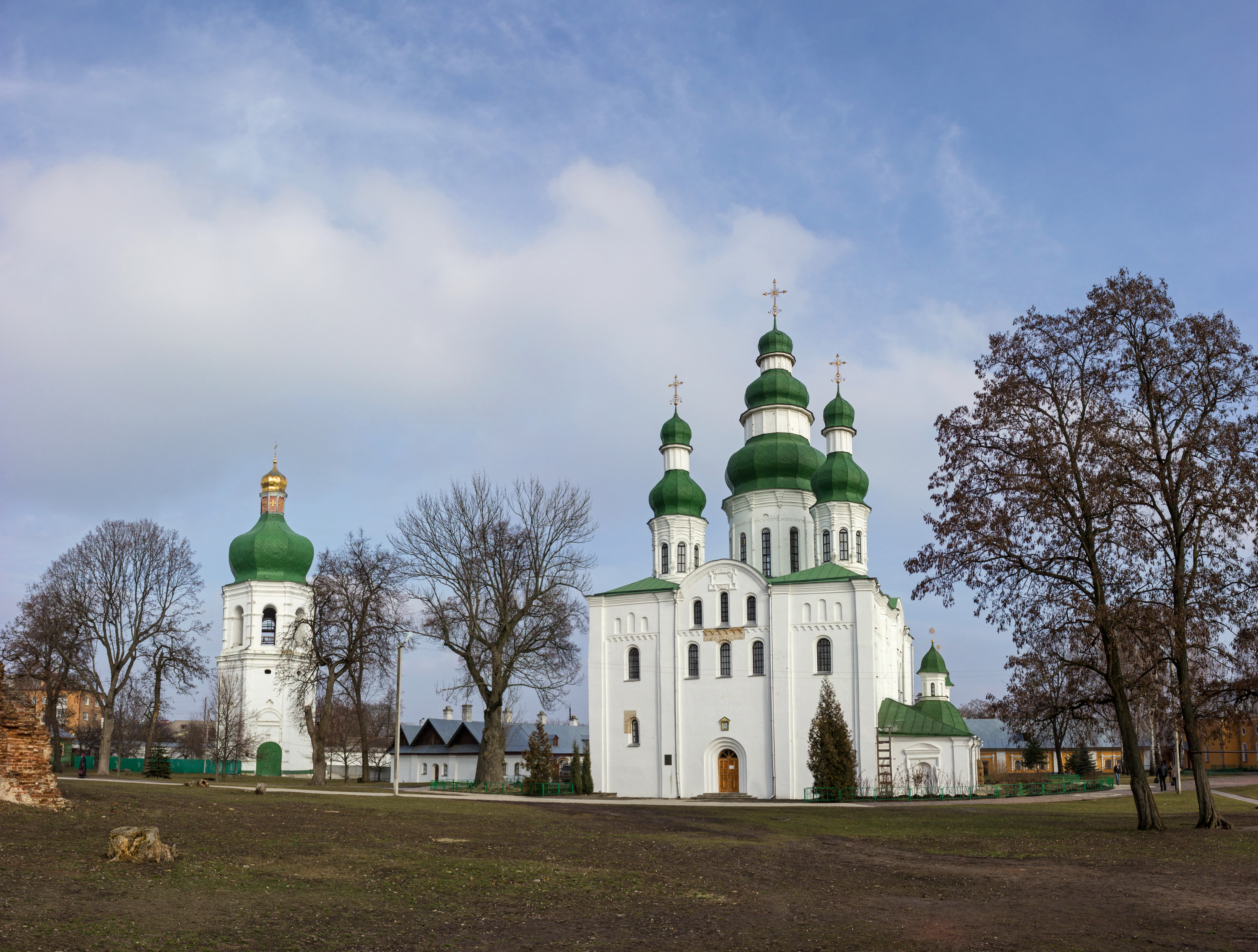

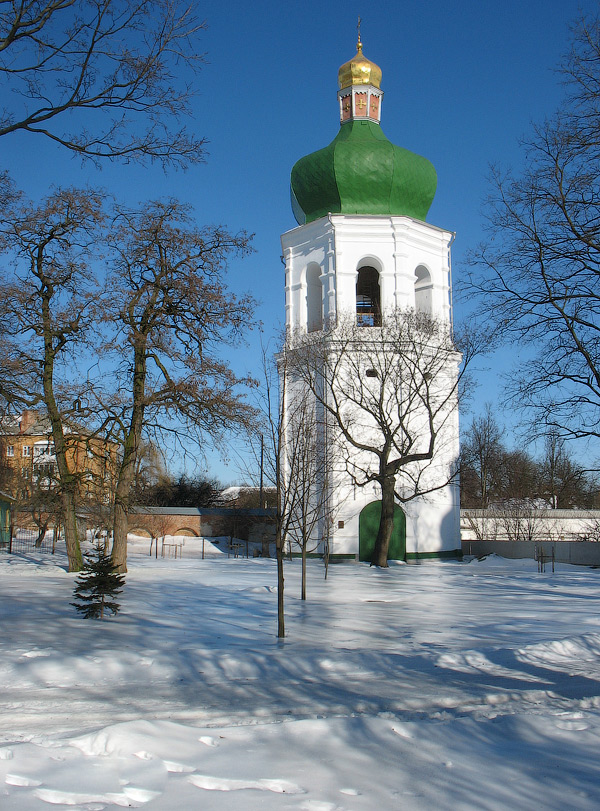
The gate bell tower

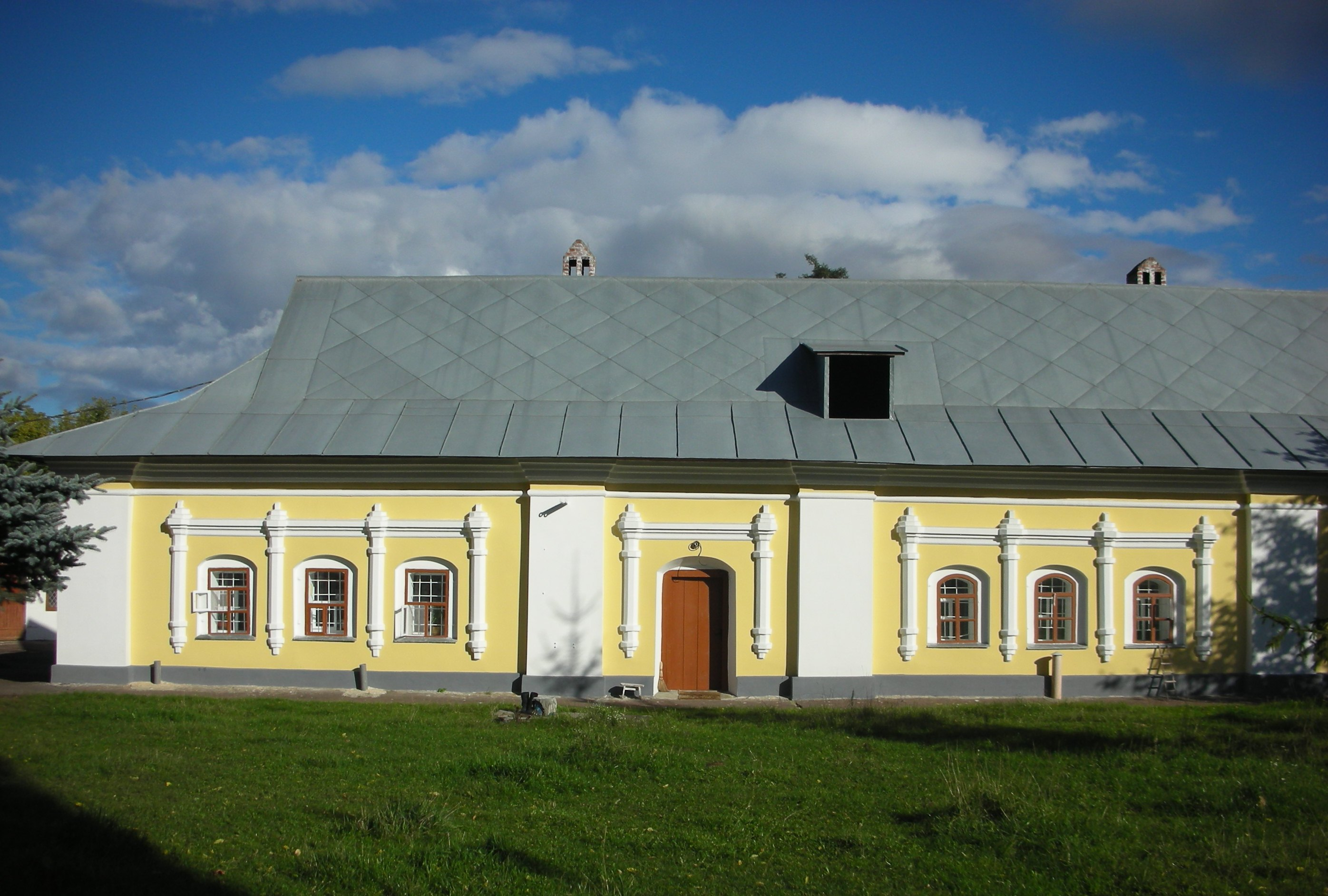

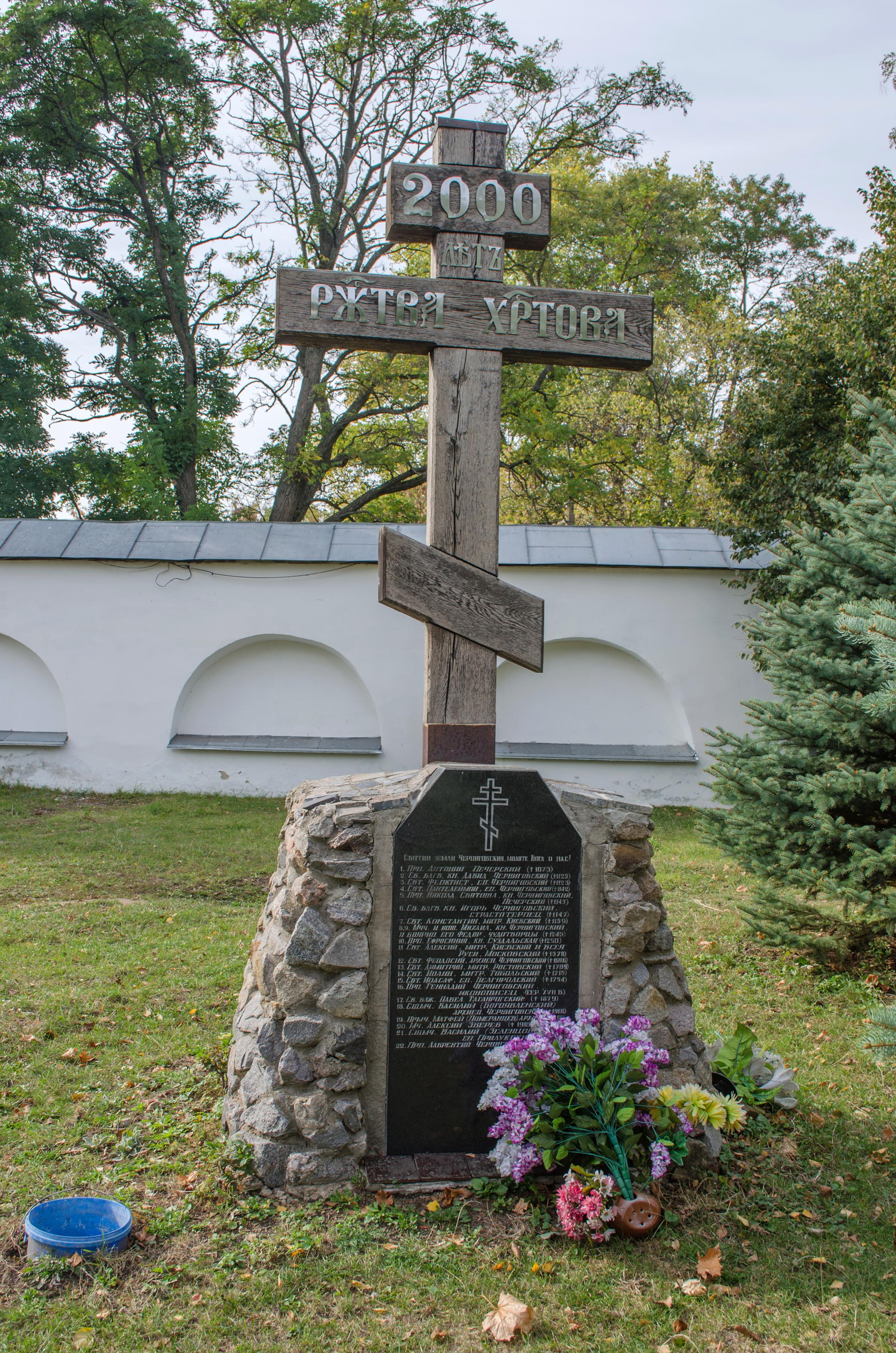

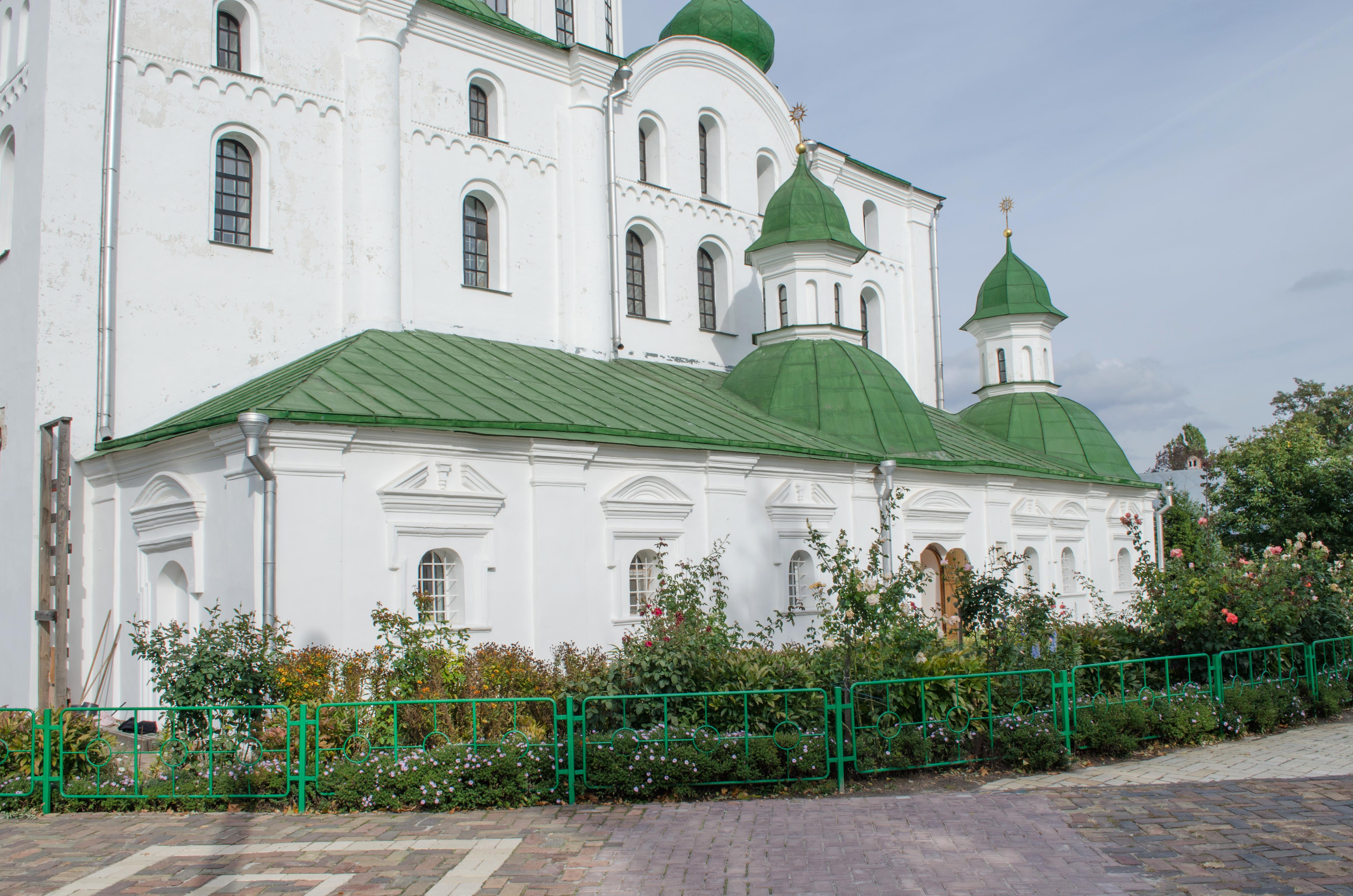
Dormition Cathedral

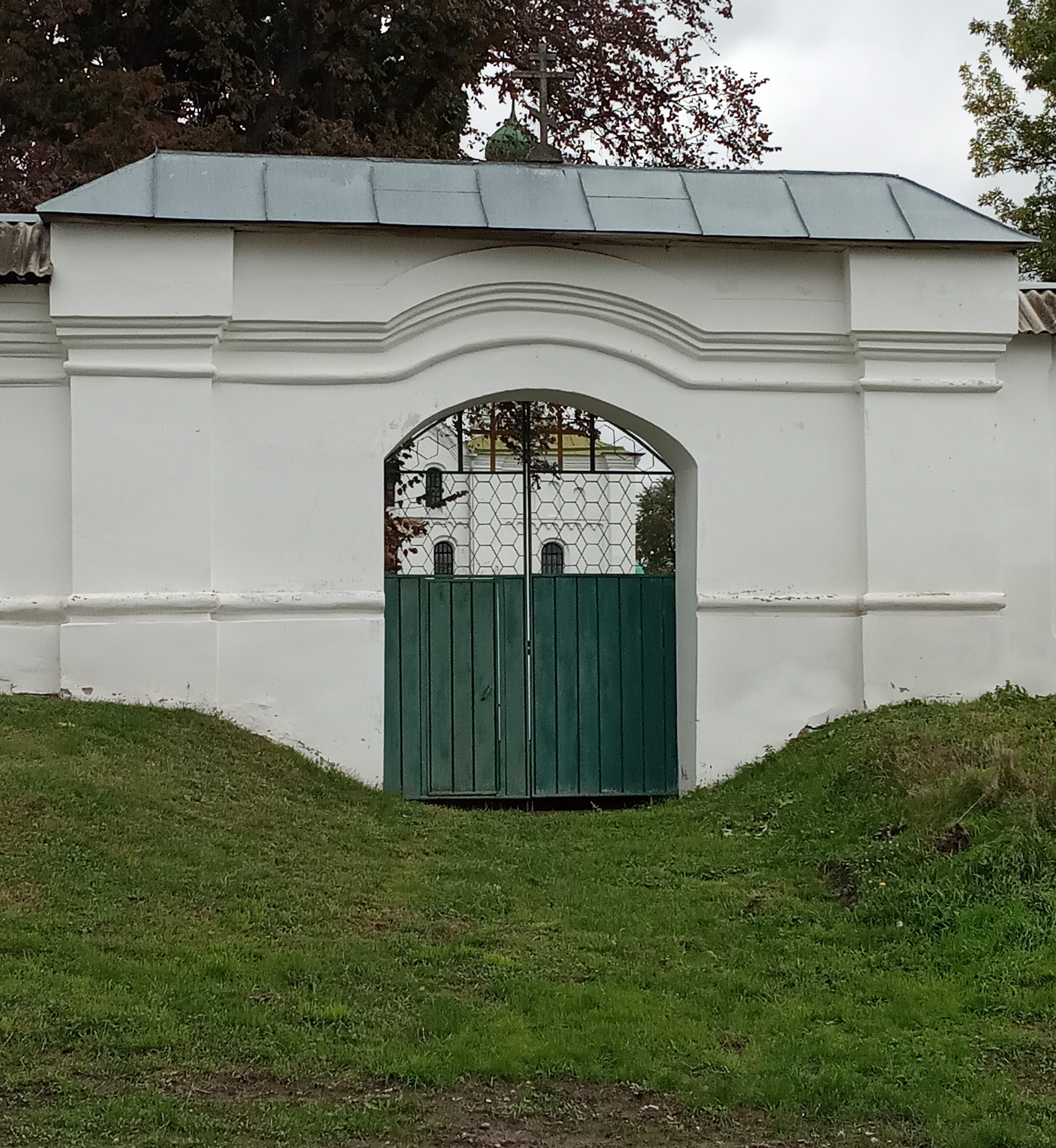

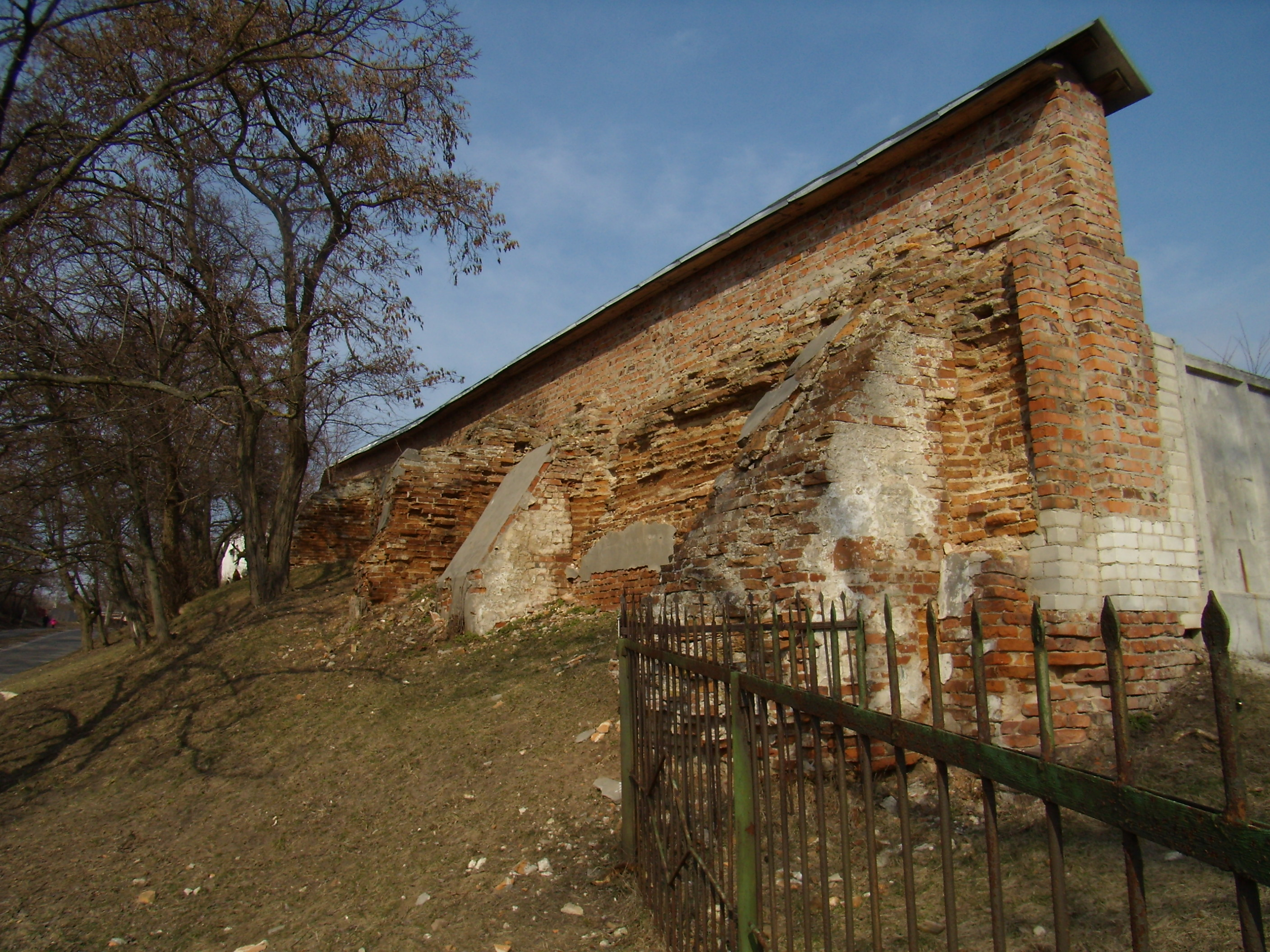
Ruins of the Abbot's House (Yeletska Hill)

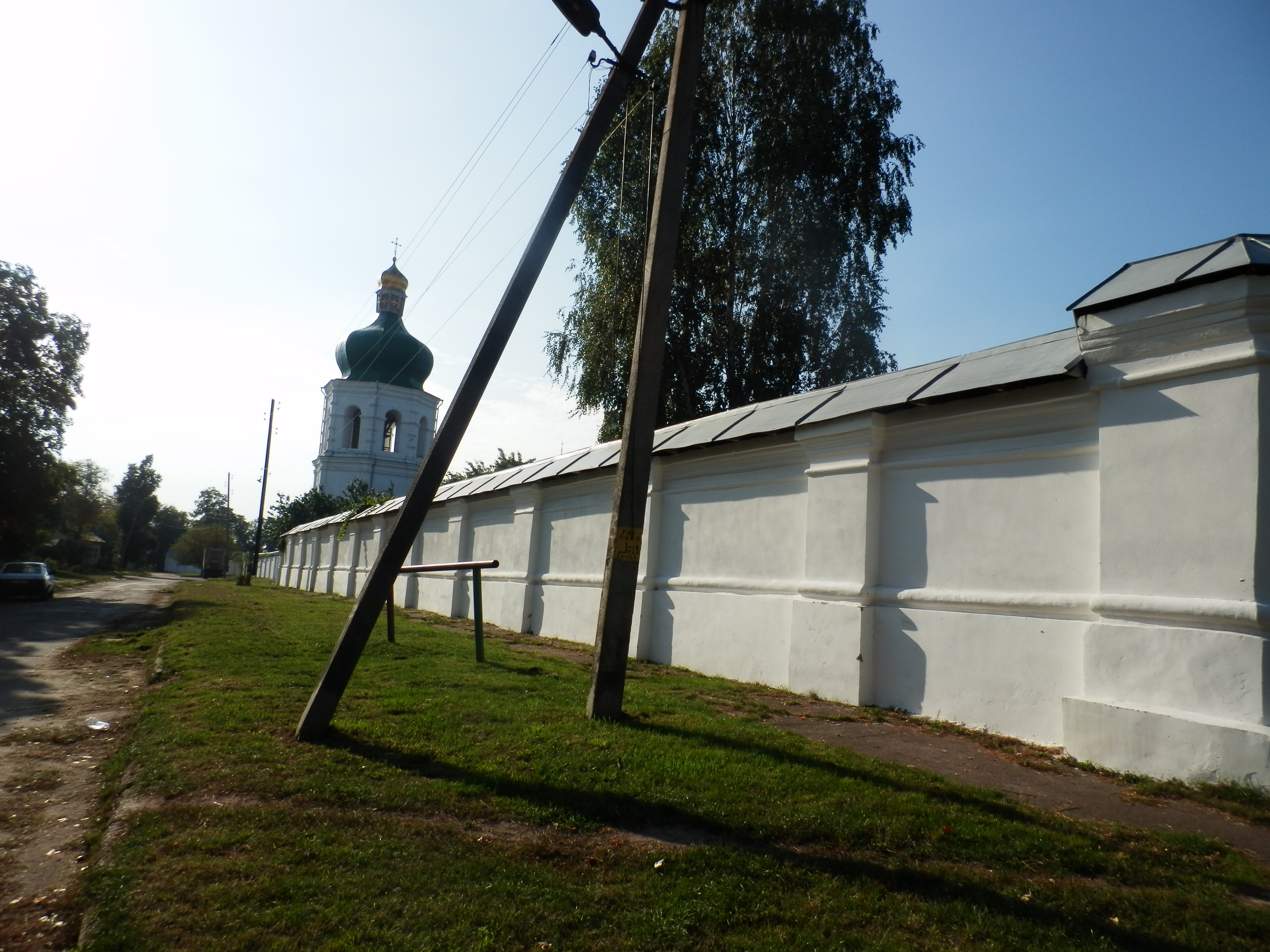
Fence of the Monastery

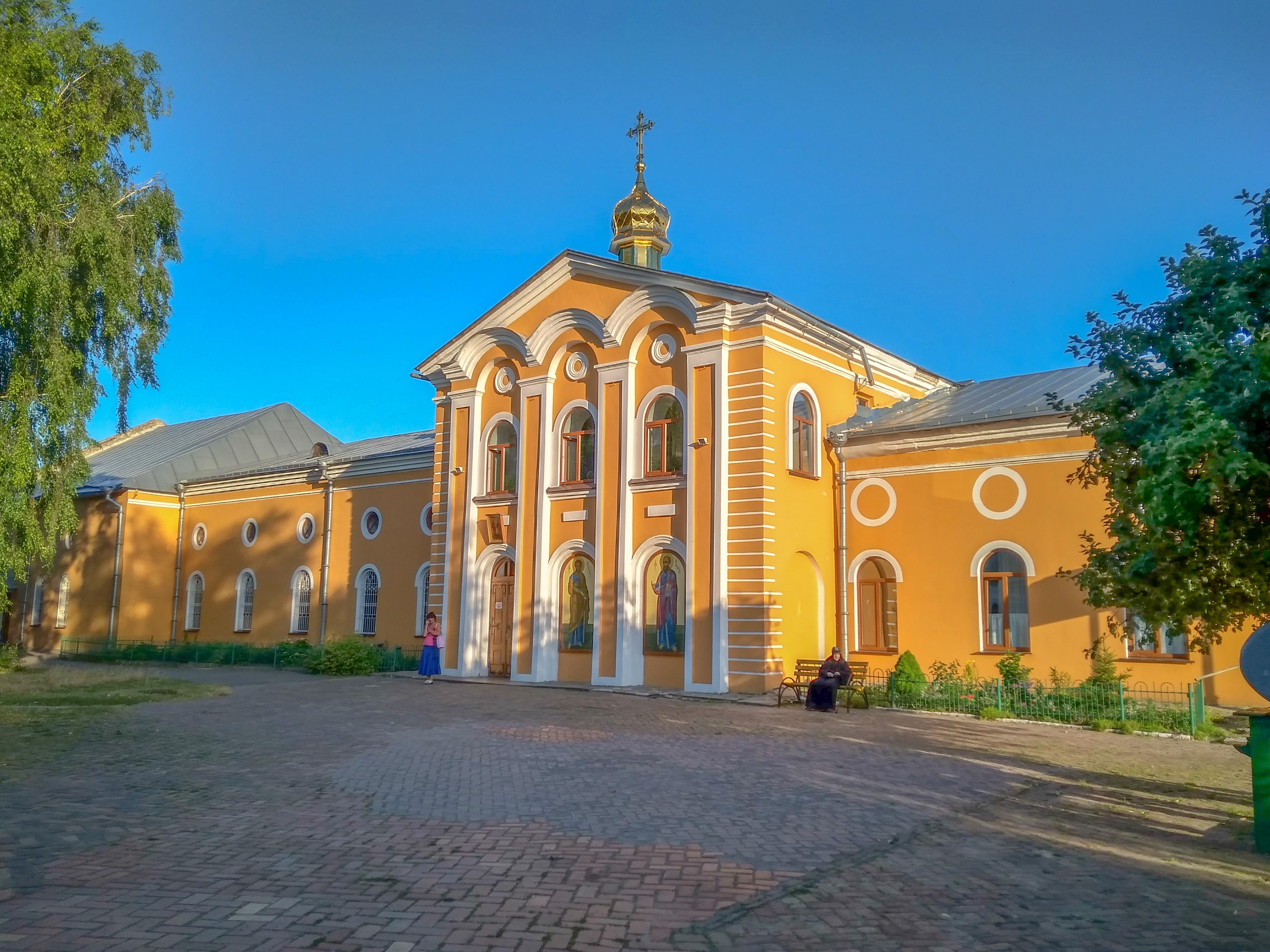
Saints Peter and Paul Church

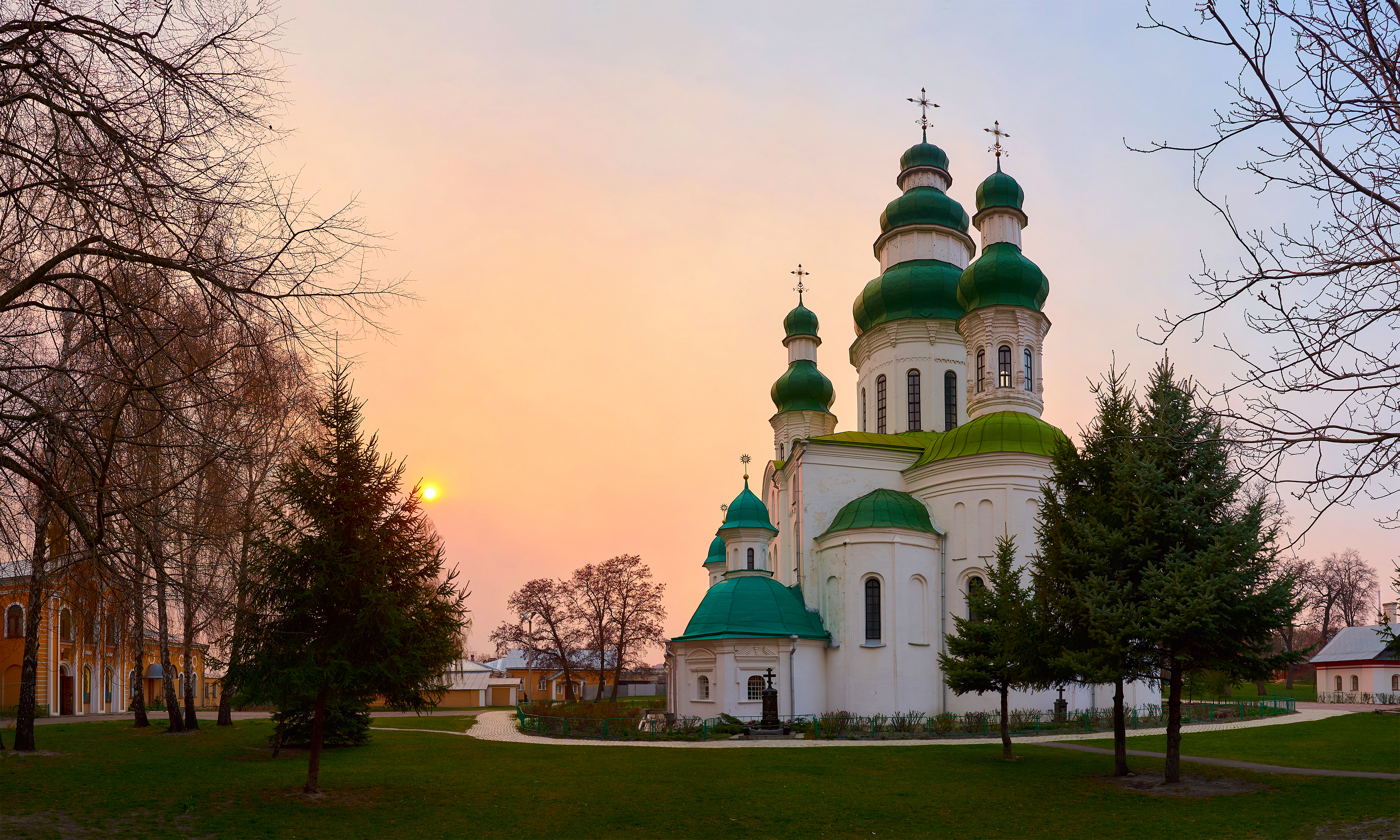
View of Dormition Cathedral from the yard

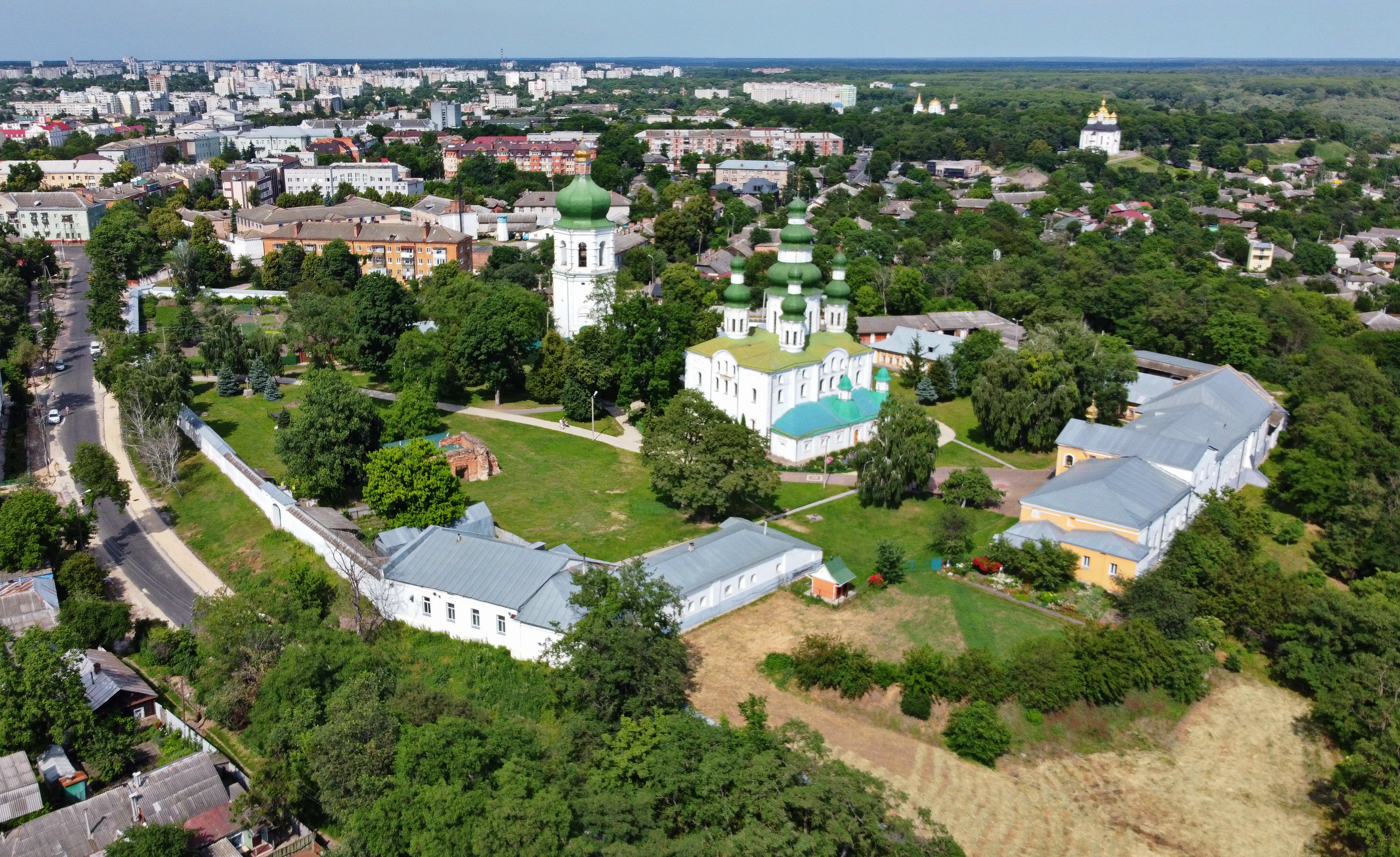
View of Monastery

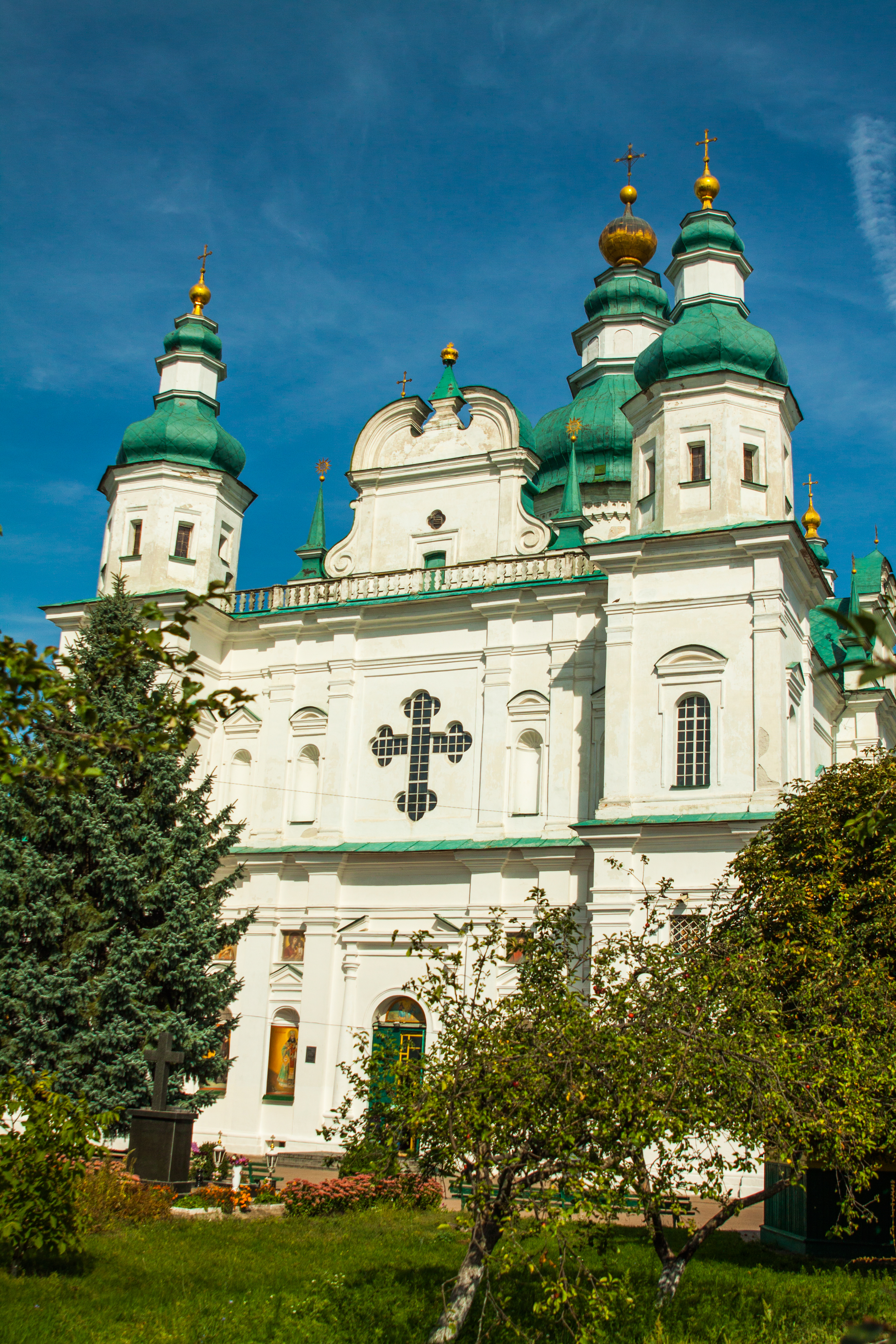
View of Dormition Cathedral

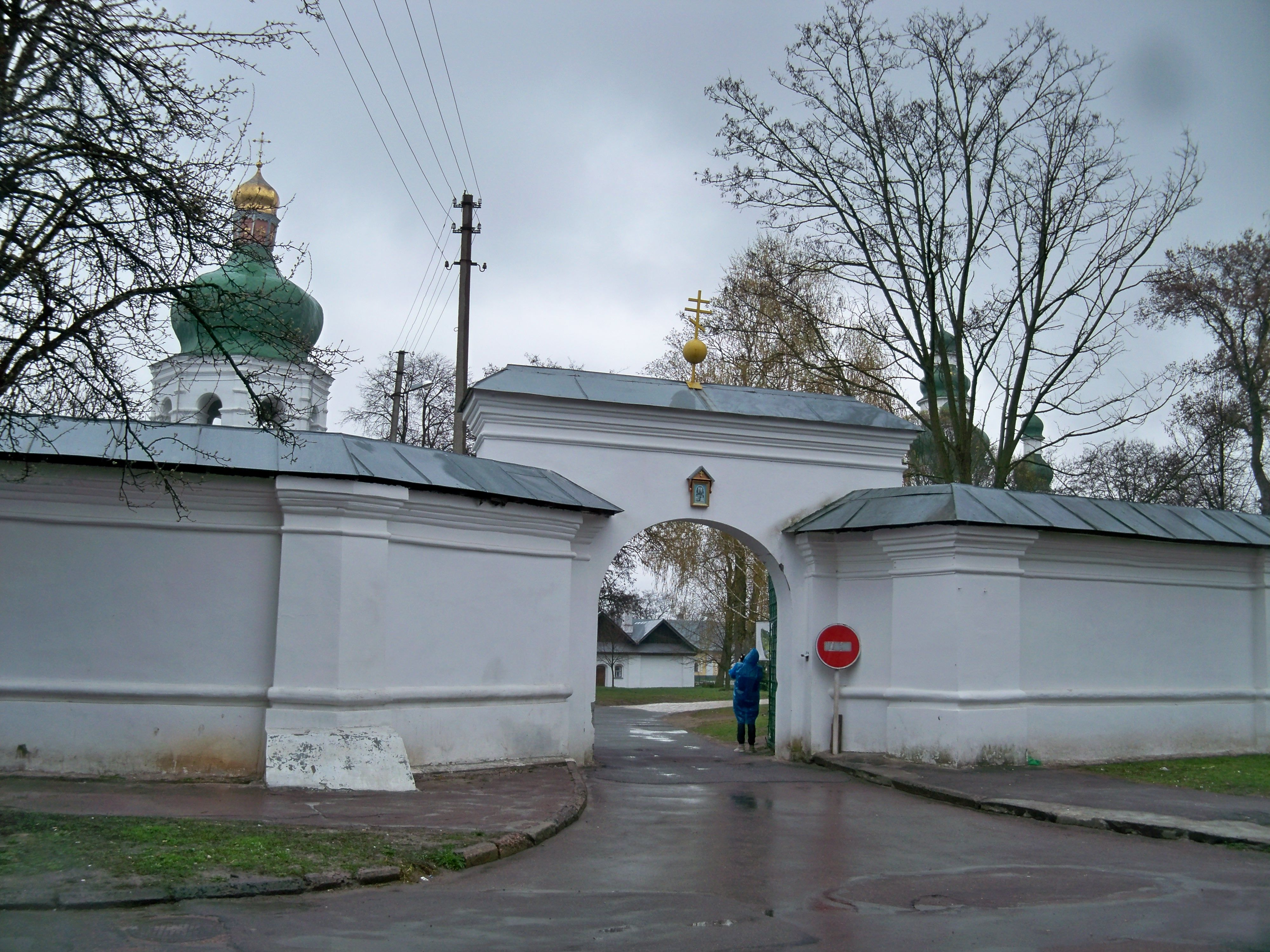

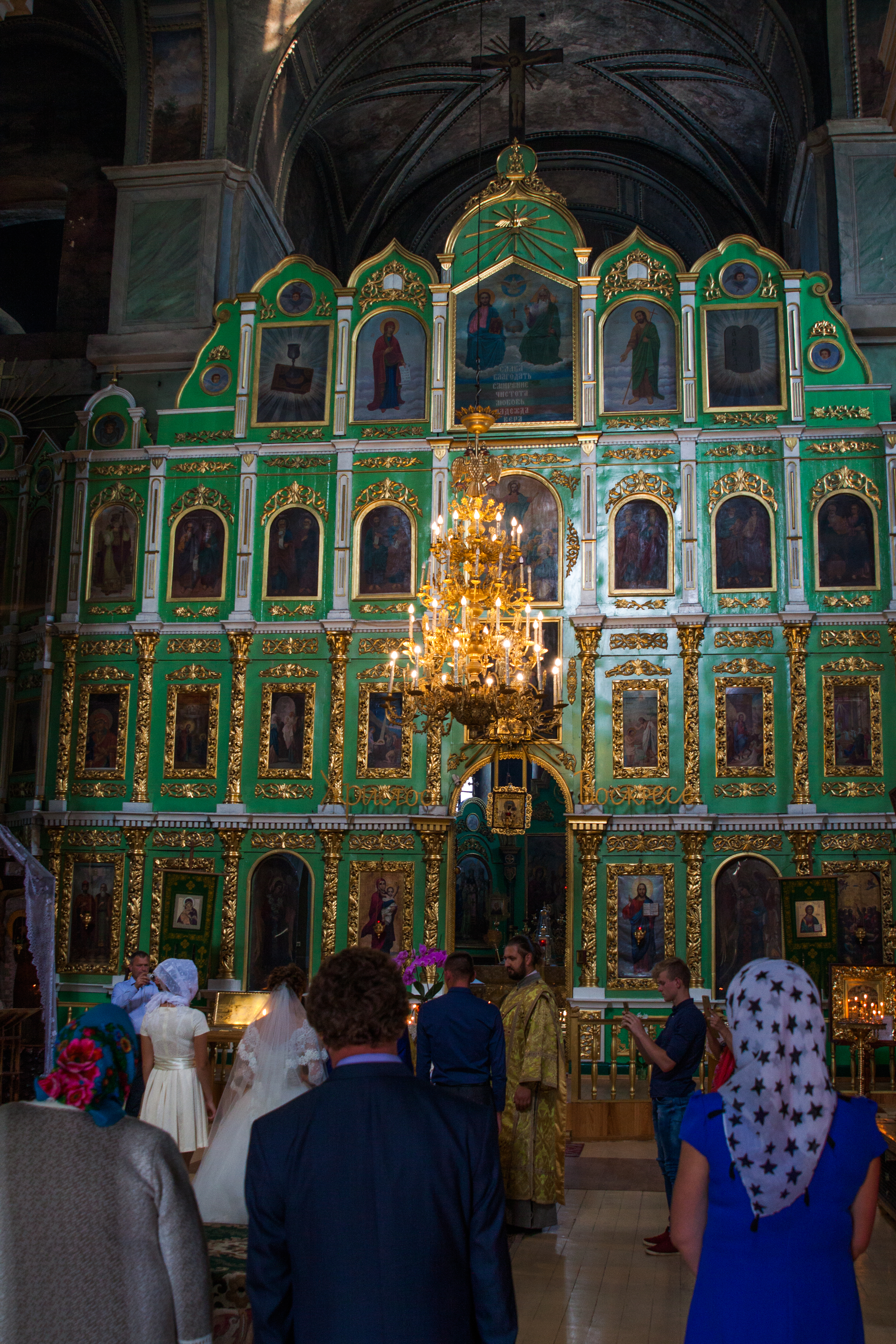
View of Dormition Cathedral from inside

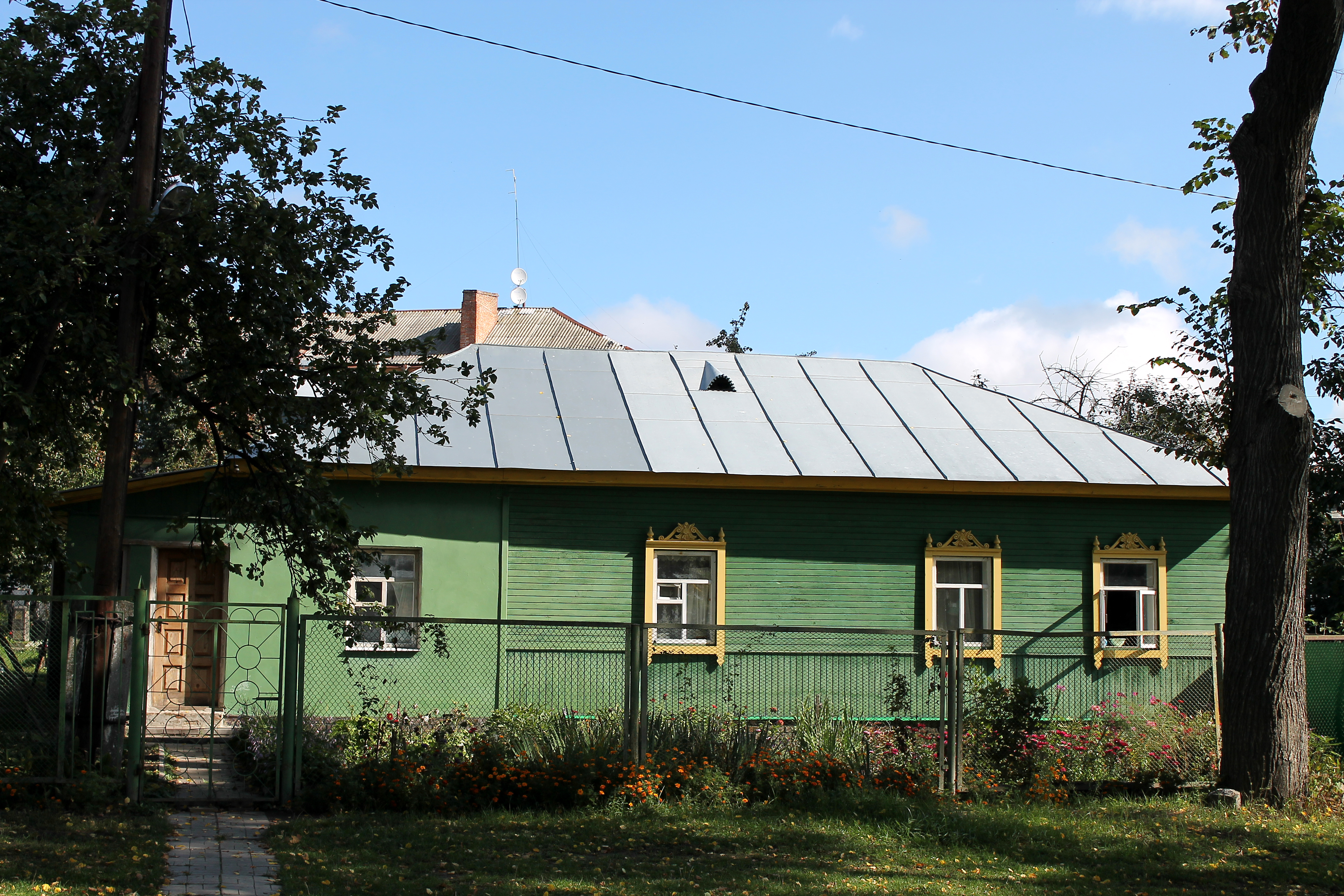
House of Theodosius of Chernihiv

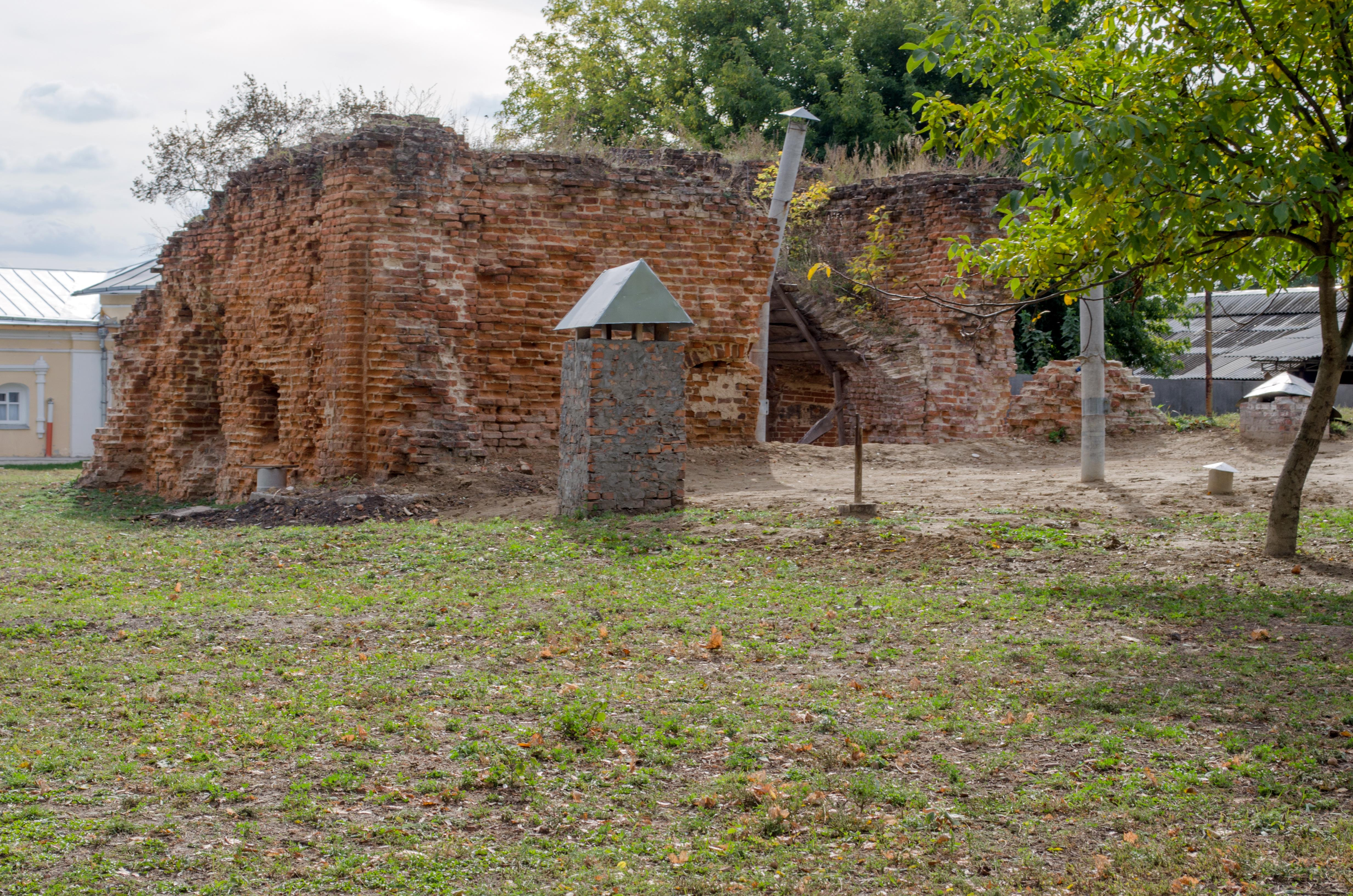

== See also ==
- List of churches and monasteries in Chernihiv
