= Lyzohub Burial Church =

Church in Chernihiv Oblast, Ukraine

- Церква усипальниця Лизогуба
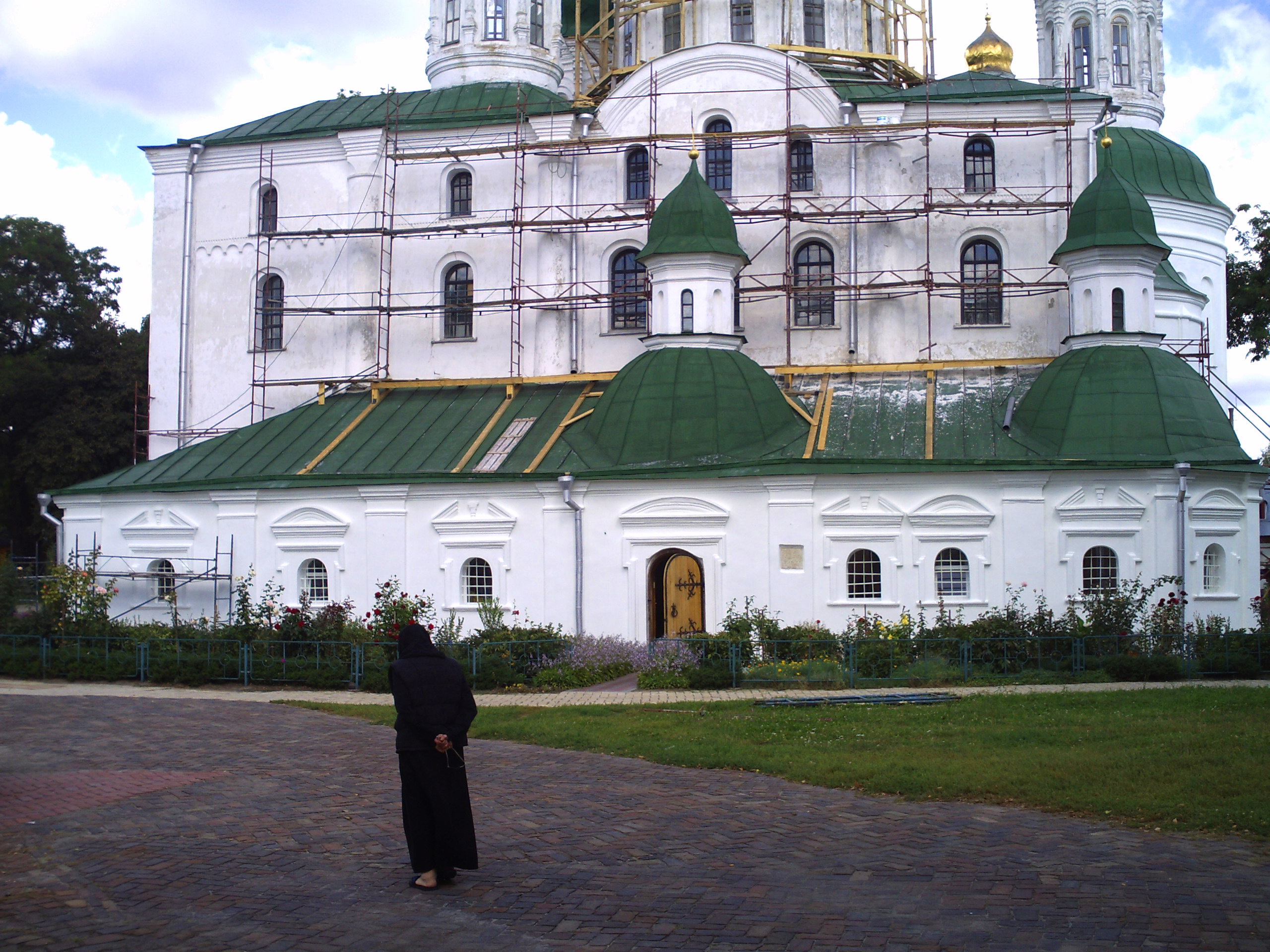
- Church of Lyzohub in Chernihiv
- Lyzohub Burial Church
- 51°29′15″N 31°17′17″E
- Location: Kniazia Chornoho Street 1, Yeletskyi Monastery, Chernihiv, Chernihiv Oblast, Ukraine, 14030
- Country: Ukraine
- Denomination: Eastern Orthodox Church

History
- Status: Chapel

Architecture
- Functional status: Active
- Architectural type: Church
- Years built: 1698
- Completed: 1701

Administration
- Diocese: Chernihiv

The Lyzohub Burial Church (Ukrainian: Церква усипальниця Лизогуба, romanized: Tserkva usypalnytsia Lyzohuba), or Yakiv's Church (Ukrainian: Церква Якова, romanized: Tserkva Yakova), is an Eastern Orthodox Church church in Chernihiv, Ukraine. It is part of the complex of buildings of the Yeletskyi Monastery – a section of the historical and architectural reserve of Ancient Chernihiv, located on Yeletska Hill, Kniazia Chornoho Street, 1.

== History ==
During his tenure as Chernihiv colonel, Yakiv Lyzohub carried out significant church construction and donated significant treasures to churches. In 1698, he began construction of a tomb in the Dormition Cathedral of the Yeletskyi Monastery. He was buried here when he died (19 August 1698), and the construction was completed by his son Yefim. After the consecration, which took place on September 14, 1701, the tomb was named the Yakov Church. Later, this temple became the tomb of the Lyzohub family. Divine services were rarely held here. It housed a rich monastery sacristy and a library with the monastery archive, until they were destroyed by fire on 21 January 1869. By the decision of the executive committee of the Chernihiv City Council of people's deputies of workers dated 28 April 1987 No. 119, the status of an architectural monument of local significance with the protection No. 35/2-Chh was assigned under the name of the Tomb of Yakiv Lyzohub on the territory of the Yeletskyi Monastery.

In March 2022 during the Siege of Chernihiv the monastery was damaged, in particular the façades of the monastery walls, the gate, and the bell tower from the 17th century, as well as the drums of the domes from the 11th–17th centuries, but the church did not suffer any damage.

== Description ==
It is a building attached to the Dormition Cathedral of the Yeletskyi Monastery, which is a church-tomb of the Cossack colonels Lyzohub. The chapel was built very tactfully in relation to the cathedral – its size corresponds to the size of the gallery that was previously located near the temple. The height of the structure, including the roof, reaches almost half the height of the temple walls. There are now two low domes above the chapel, and there used to be a third one above the western part.

== Gallery ==
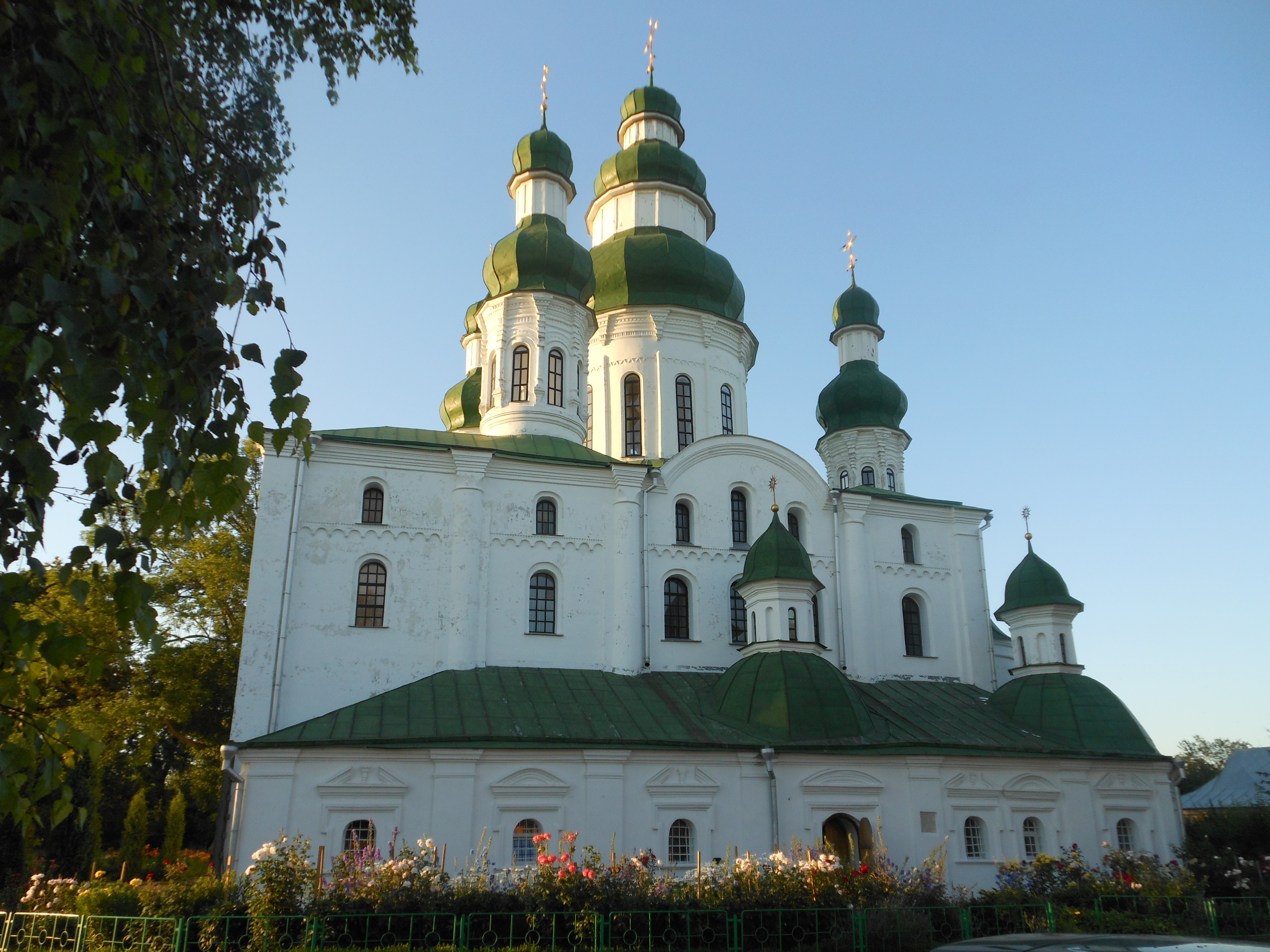

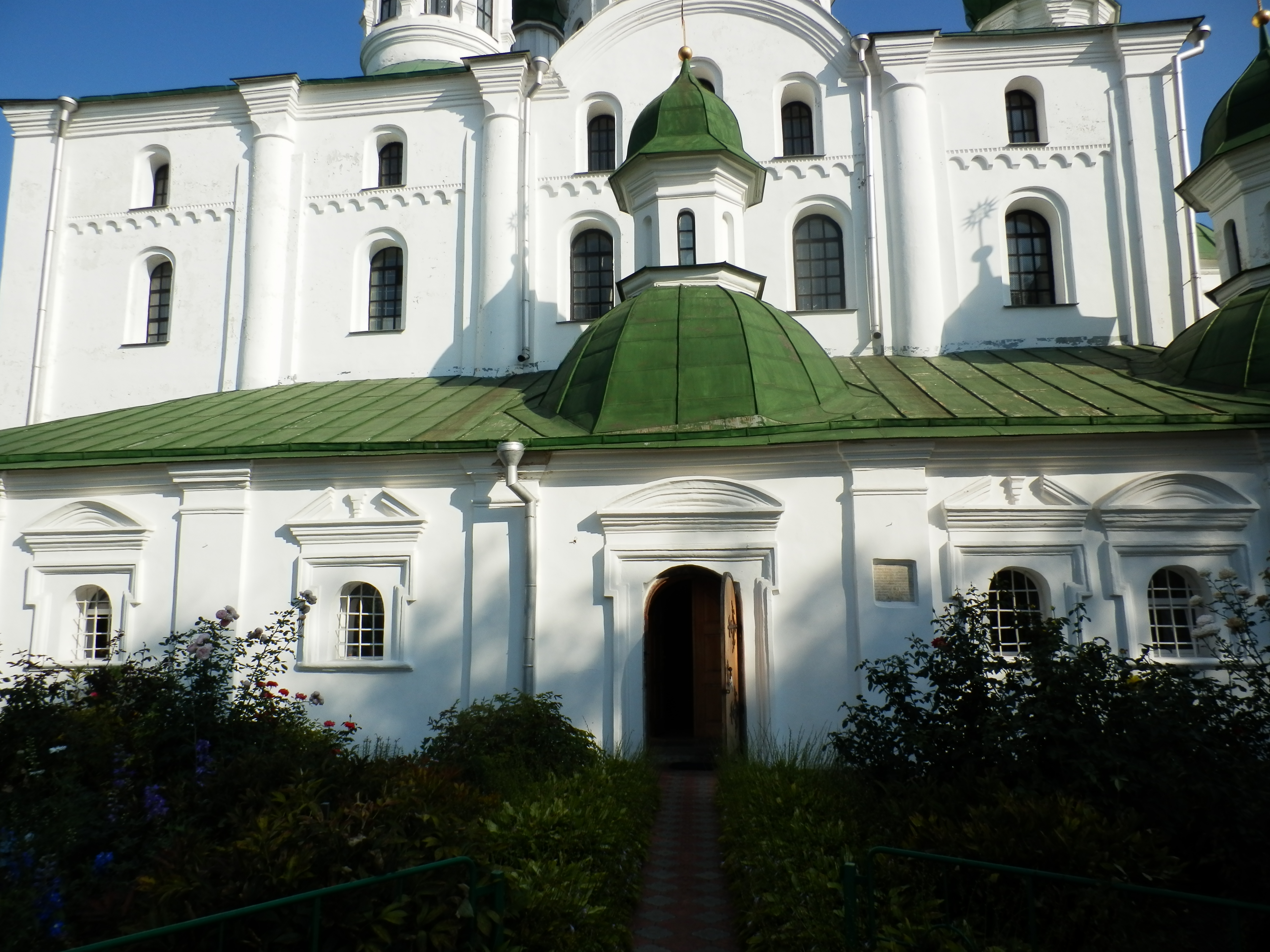

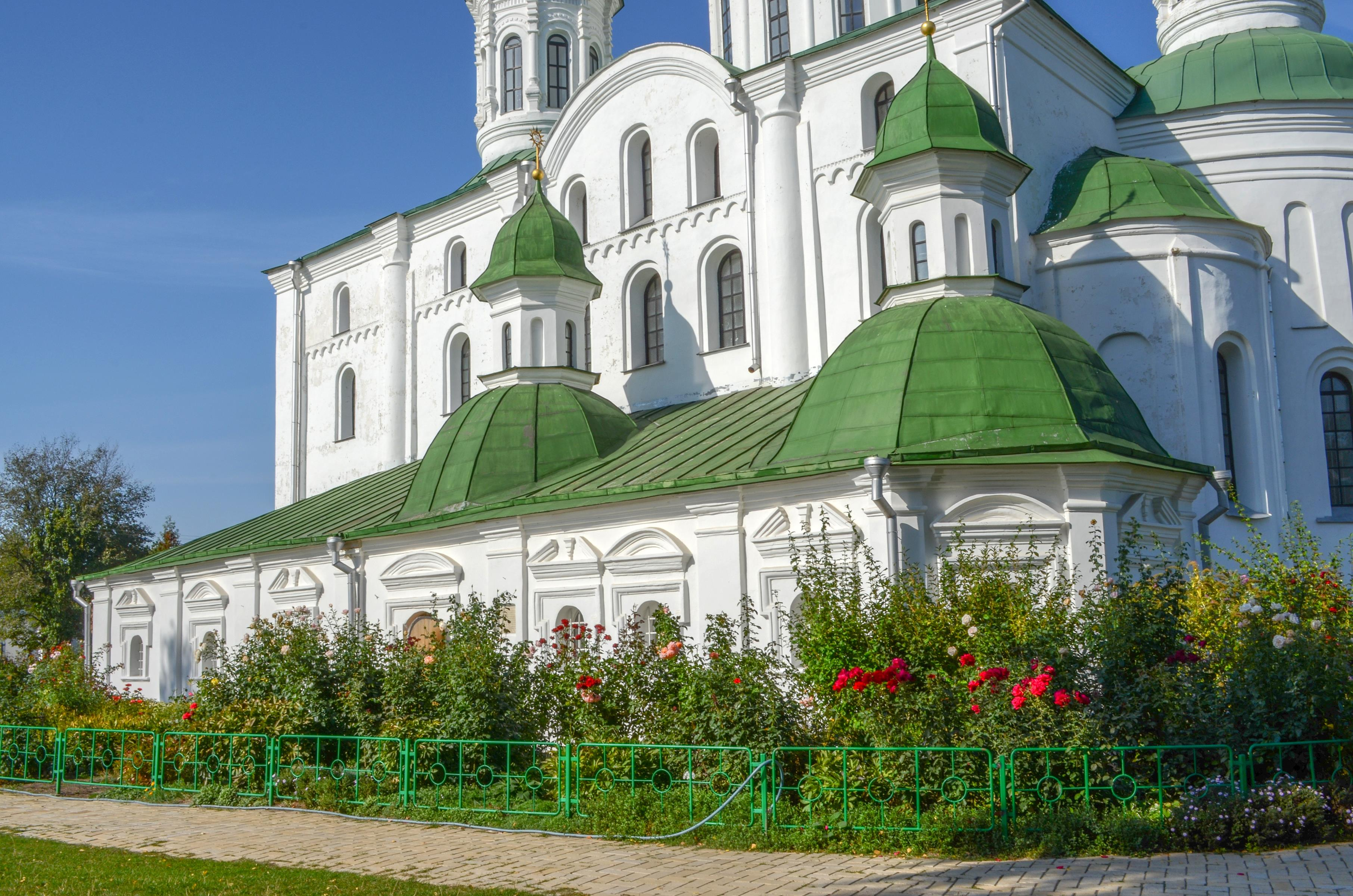

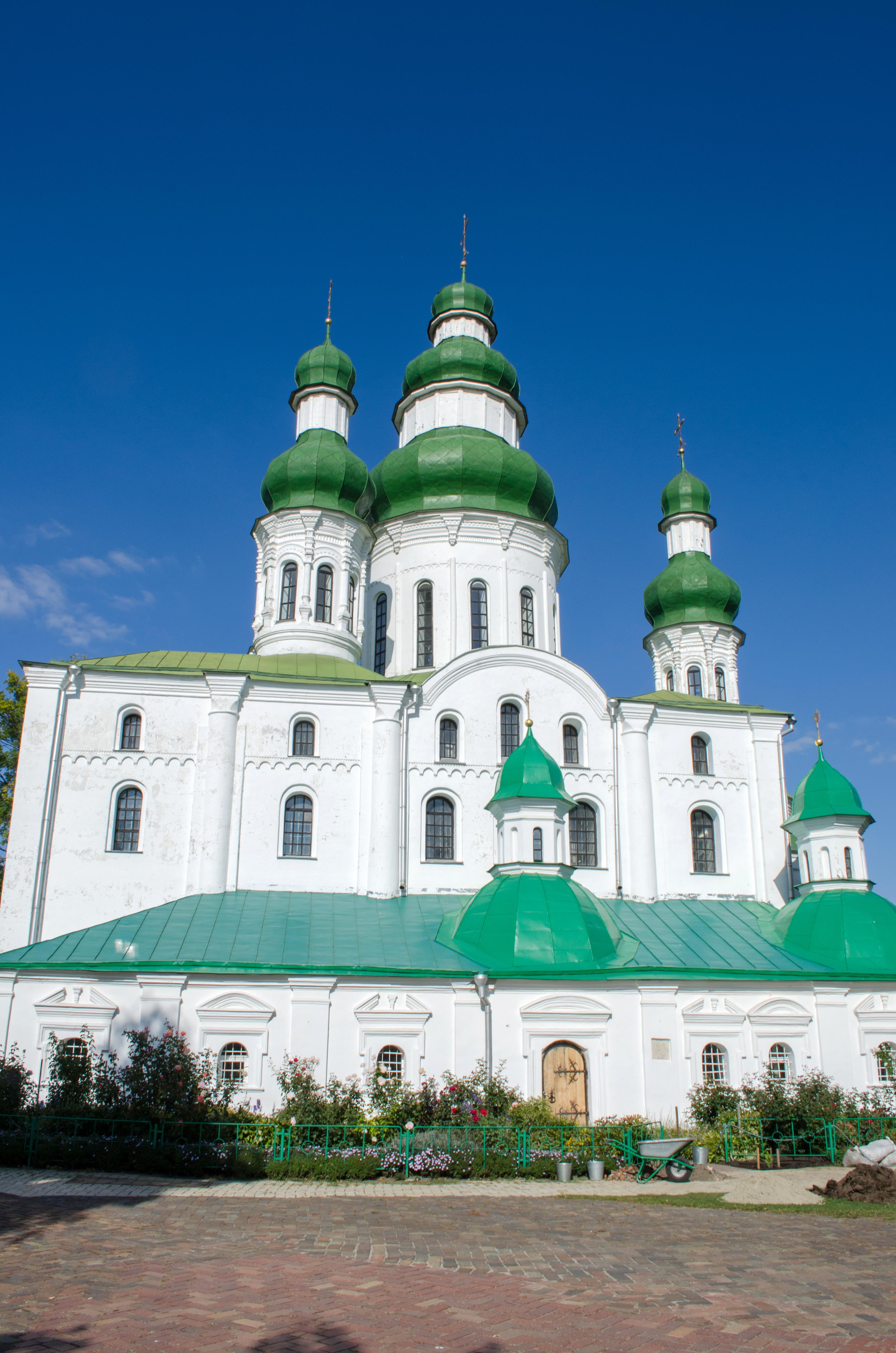

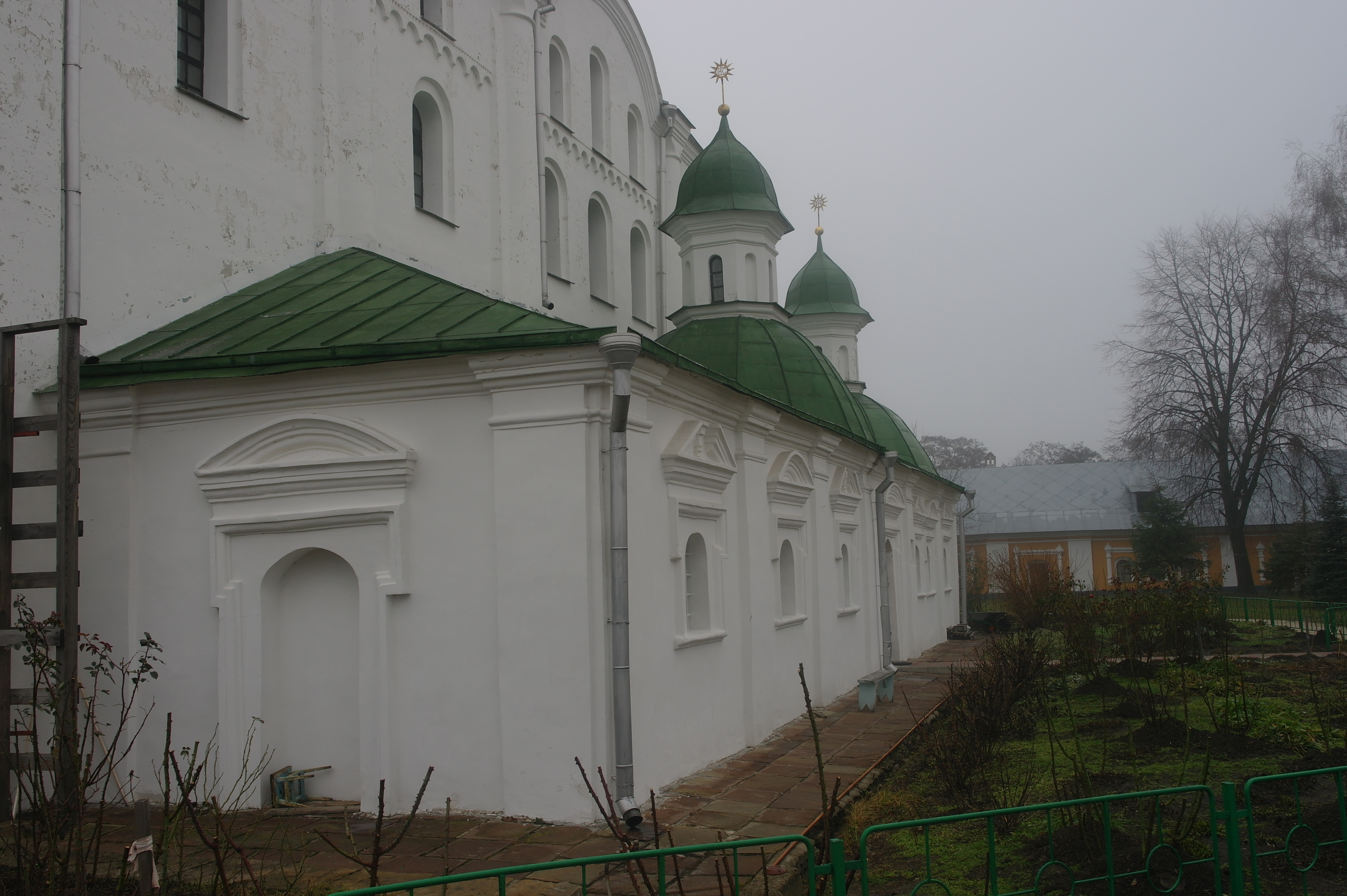

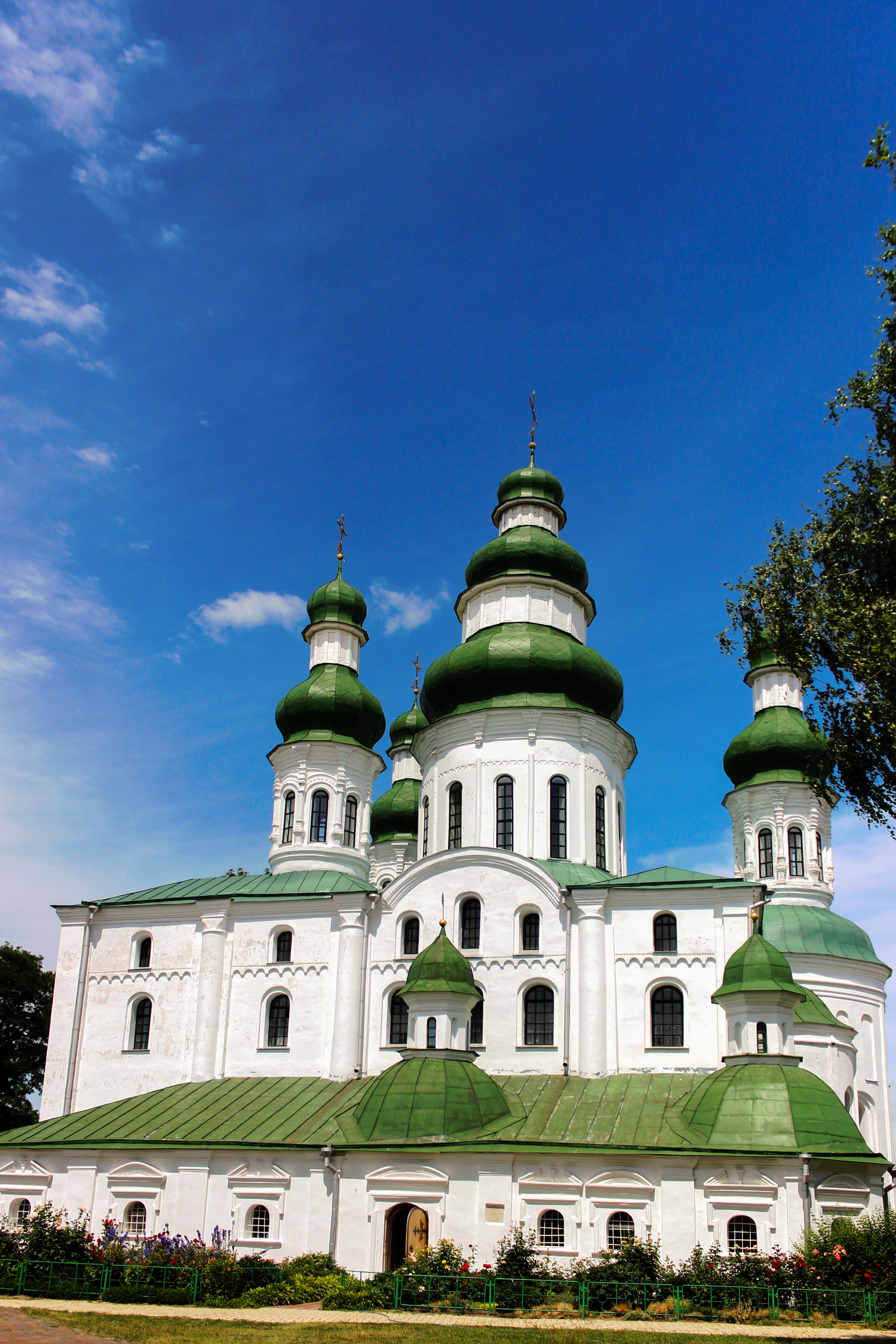

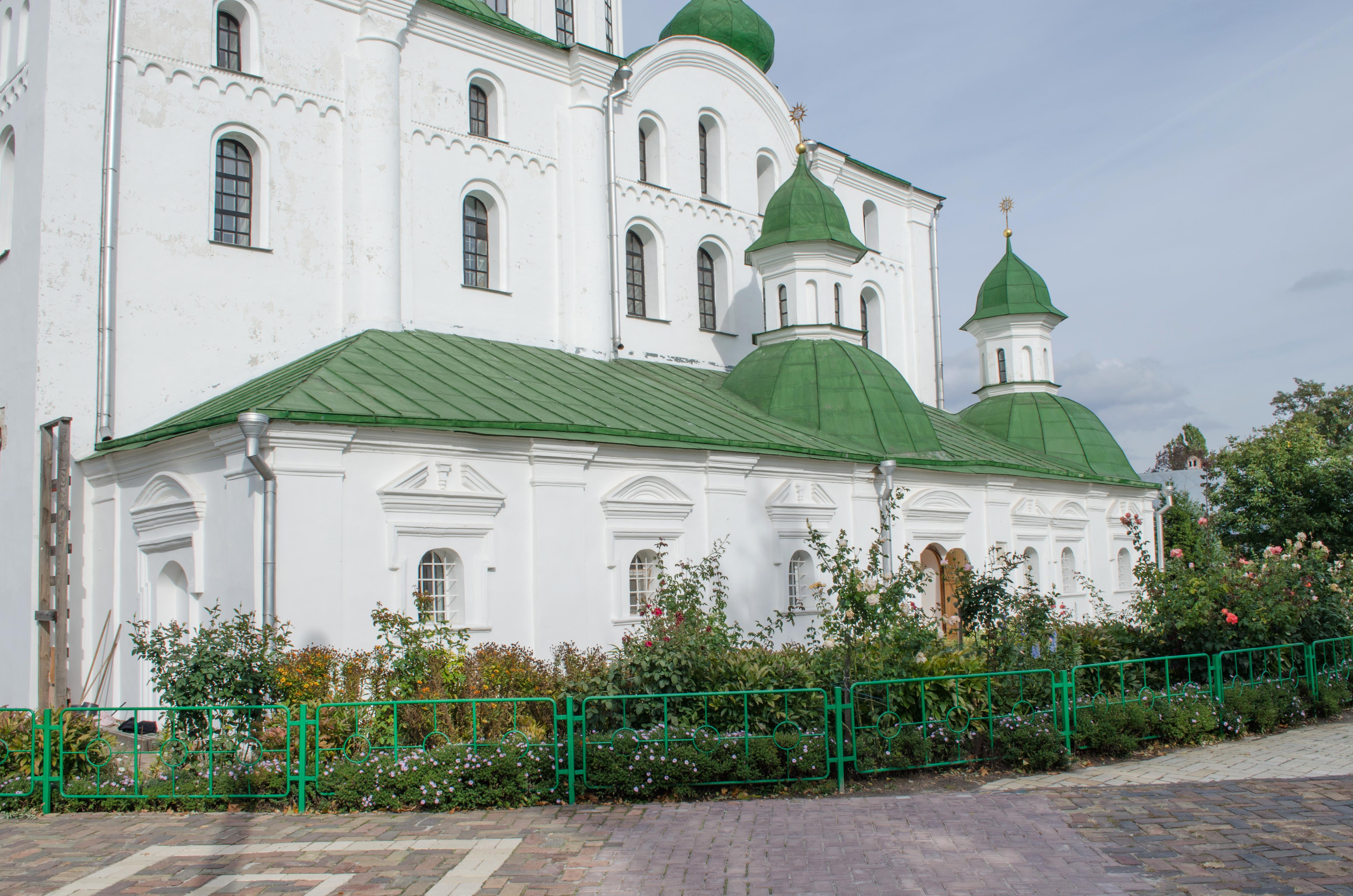

== See also ==
- List of churches and monasteries in Chernihiv
