= St. Elijah Church, Chernihiv =

Church in Chernihiv Oblast, Ukraine

St. Elijah Church
- Illinska Church
- Іллінська церква
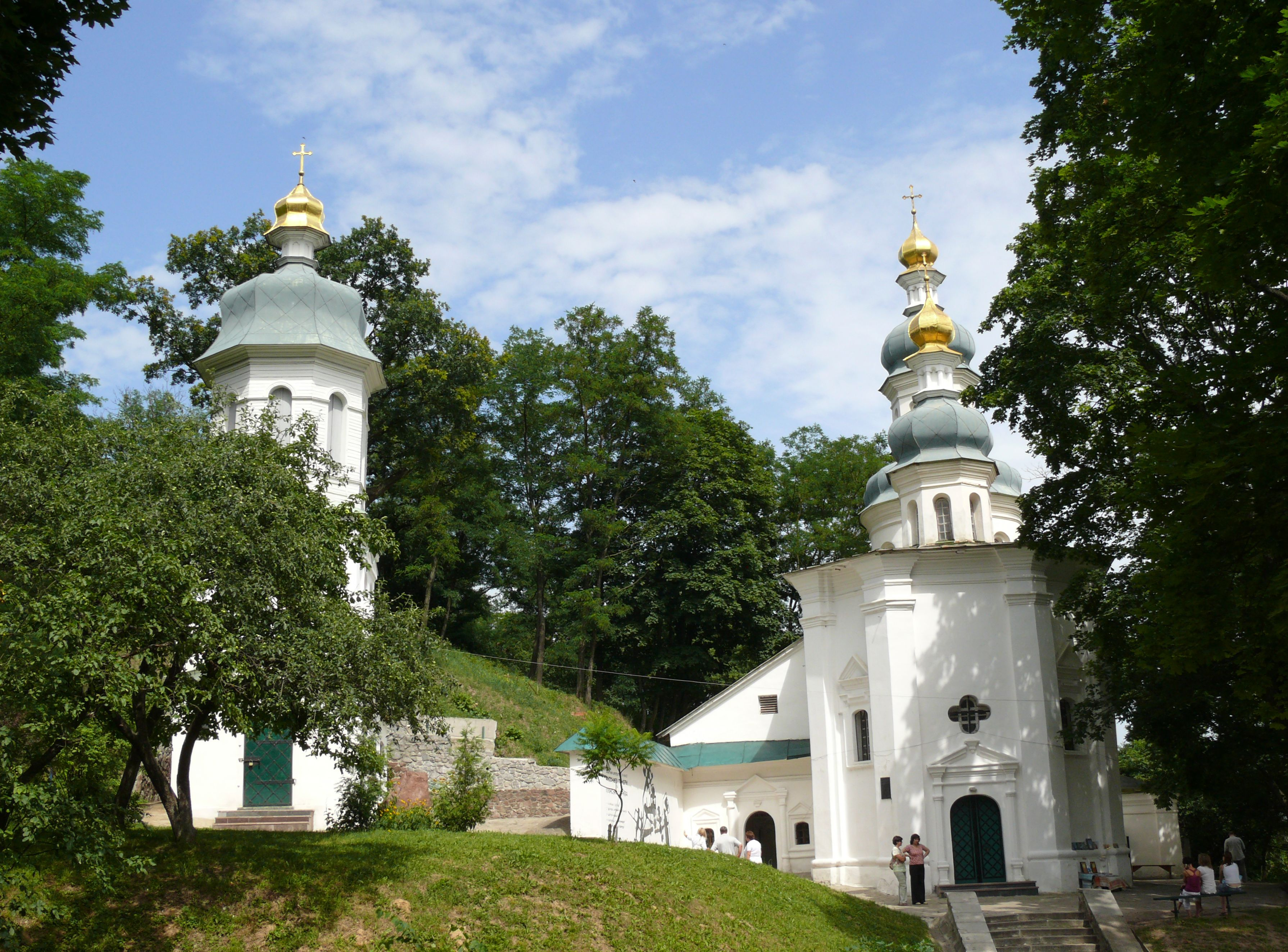
- St. Elijah Church in Chernihiv
- St. Elijah Church
- 51°28′40″N 31°17′03″E
- Location: Illinska Street, Chernihiv, Chernihiv Oblast, 14030
- Country: Ukraine
- Denomination: Eastern Orthodox Church

History
- Status: Chapel

Architecture
- Functional status: Active, museum
- Architectural type: Temple
- Style: Kievan Rus' (original), Ukrainian Baroque (rebuilt)
- Years built: 7
- Groundbreaking: 1820 (restoration)
- Completed: 12th century

Administration
- Diocese: Chernihiv

Immovable Monument of National Significance of Ukraine
- Official name: Іллінська церква Троїцько-Іллінського монастиря (St. Elijah Church of St. Elijah–Trinity Monastery)
- Type: Architecture
- Reference no.: 250053/1

The St. Elijah Church, or Illinska Church (Ukrainian: Іллінська церква), is an Eastern Orthodox church that is part of the Trinity Monastery in Chernihiv, Ukraine. The church is located on the slope of the Boldyni Hory.

== History ==
The church was built in the 12th century (although chronicle sources do not mention the time of the temple's construction) near the southern entrance to the Saint Anthony Caves, together with which it laid the foundation for the St. Elijah Monastery.

At first, it served as a baptismal font and belonged to a rare type for Dnieper architecture – it was three-part (it initiated the development of the three-part type of temple in Ukrainian brick architecture of the 13th–18th centuries), single-nave, miniature in size, and consisted of a rectangular nave, a nave, and a semicircular apse. A small porch adjoined the nave from the west.

During the Tatar invasion in the 13th century, the St. Elijah Church suffered significant damage, and only in the 16th century was it restored and completed – the church walls were crowned with a cornice, small domes were built above the apse and the women's chapel, and the church turned into a three-nave church, and a sacristy was added to the apse on the southern side of the church.

In 1239, after a period of decline, the cave monastery was revived only in the middle of the 17th century, after the liberation of the Chernigov region from the Poles. The church of Saint Elijah was rebuilt in the Baroque style, and from then on the monastery was called Ilyinskij. In the same period, the Ilyinskaya icon of the Mother of God became famous for its miracles.

The modern appearance of the St. Elijah Church is the result of reconstructions of the 17th–18th centuries. In particular, in 1649, at the expense of the Chernihiv colonel S. Podobayl, the porch was dismantled and a large faceted volume was erected in its place, the babynets were expanded, after which the church received a three-bay multi-tiered finish, the bathhouse above the old babynets was dismantled and a new one was erected above the extension. As a result of these reconstructions, the monument acquired the features of Ukrainian Baroque.

In 1908–1910, a three-tiered bell tower (of the octagonal-on-quaternary type) was built to the northwest of the St. Elijah Church. The lower two-tiered quaternary is made of stone, the upper eight-tiered is made of wood. The bell tower is crowned by a two-tiered bathhouse of Baroque outlines. Since 1967, the St. Elijah Church has been part of the National Architectural and Historical Reserve Ancient Chernihiv and is its museum.

In 1969–1982, the church was restored according to the design of architect M. M. Govdenko.

Today, the St. Elijah Church is the only surviving single-nave church from the era of Kievan Rus' in Ukraine. In 2025 the St. Elijah Church opened to the public for the first time in 5 Years.

== Interior ==
The interior of the church is dominated by the high-altitude principle of opening up the internal space. The main feature of the interior architecture is the use of elements of the Byzantine cross-domed system with a column-free composition of the church, which is typical of wooden architecture. The ancient interior decor has been lost. Neither the fresco nor the floor made of glazed ceramic tiles has survived.

Only the iconostasis of 1774 in the Rococo style, which interprets the Corinthian order, has survived. The St. Elijah Church housed an outstanding work of Ukrainian painting – the icon "Illinska Theotokos", created in 1658 by Hryhorii Dubensky. A legend is associated with it, which is given in the chronicle of Samiilo Velychko.

== Protection status ==
The St. Elijah Church is an architectural monument of national significance of Chernihiv Oblast.

== Gallery ==
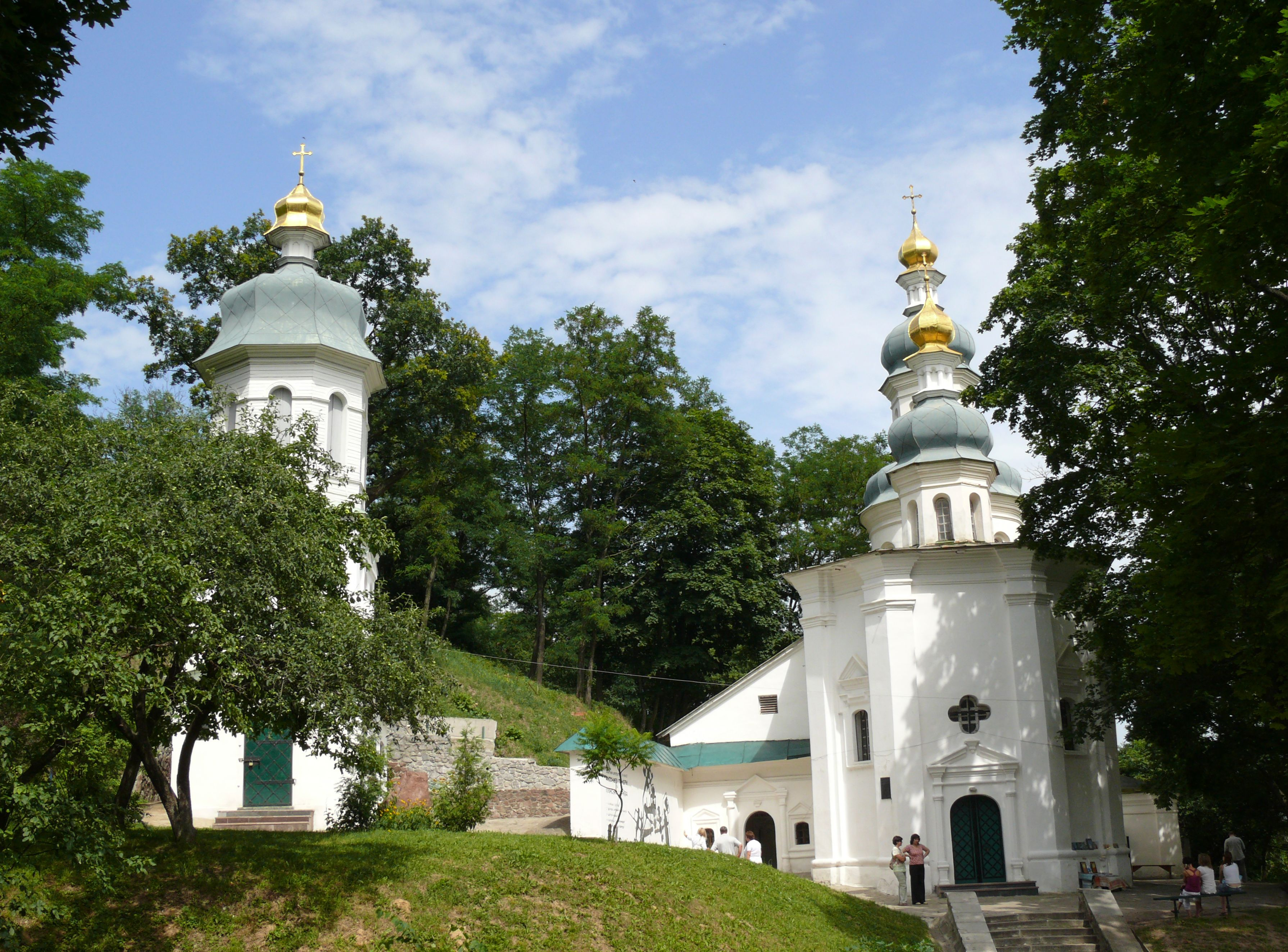

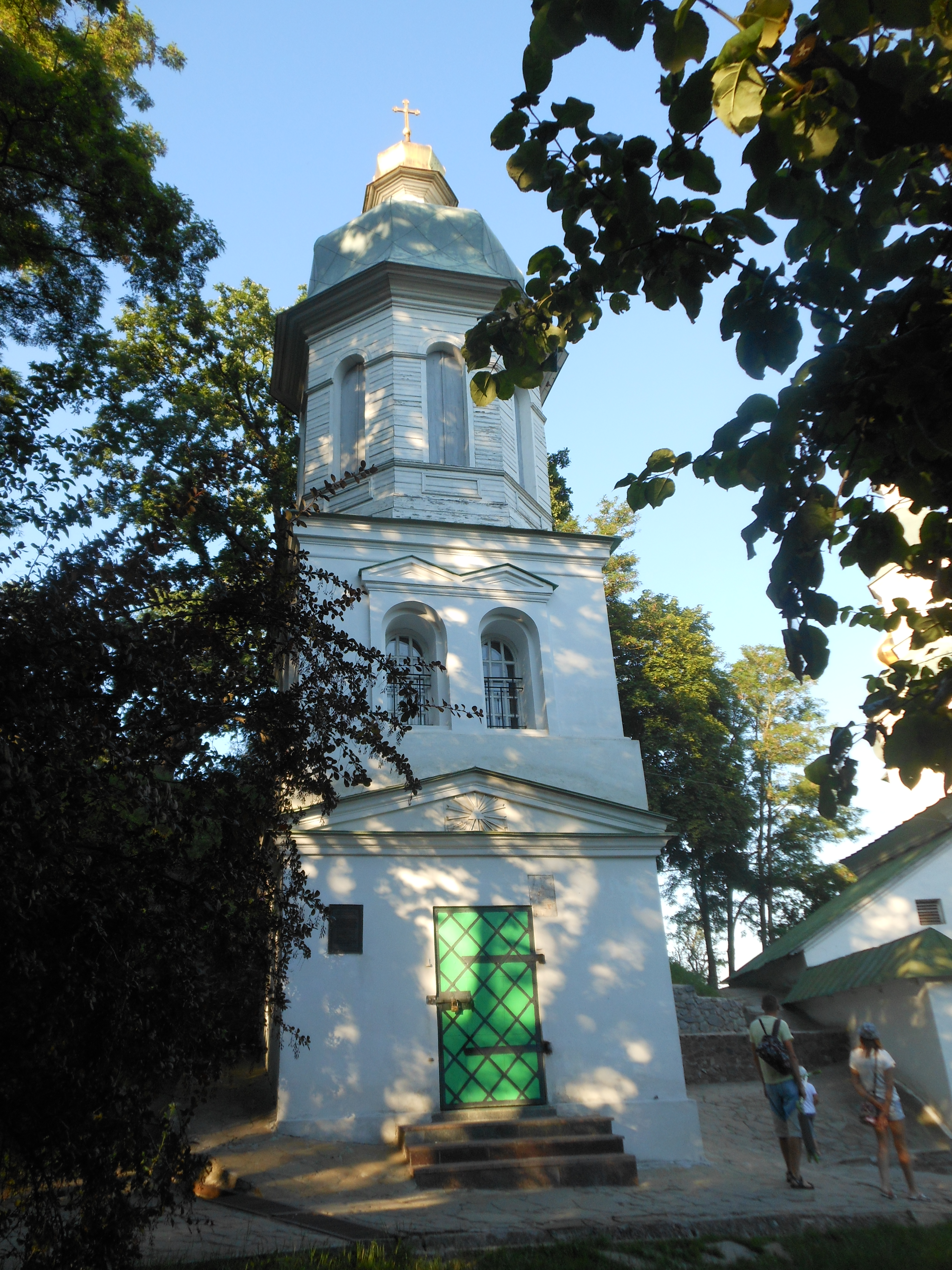
Bell tower of St. Elijah Church

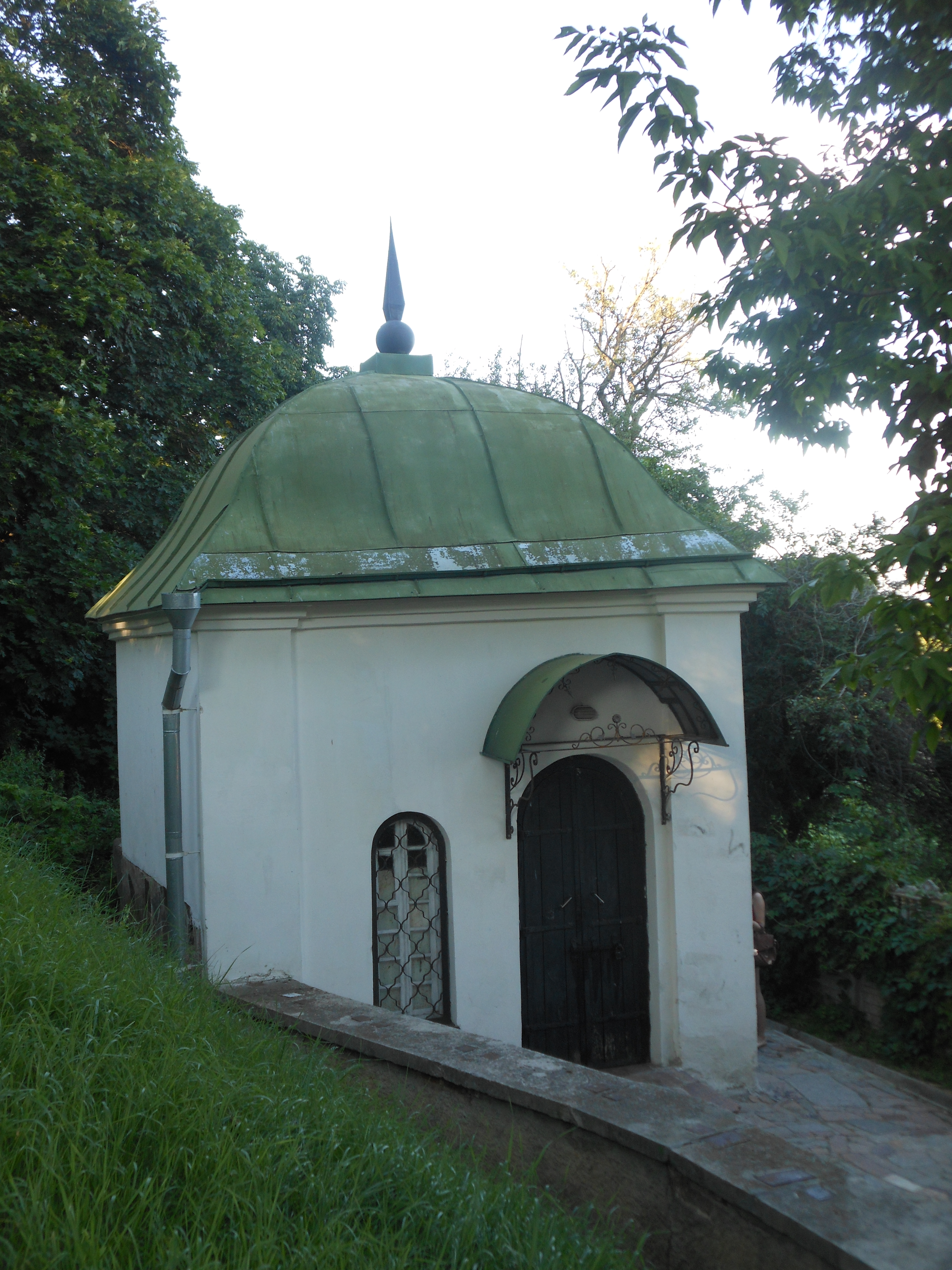

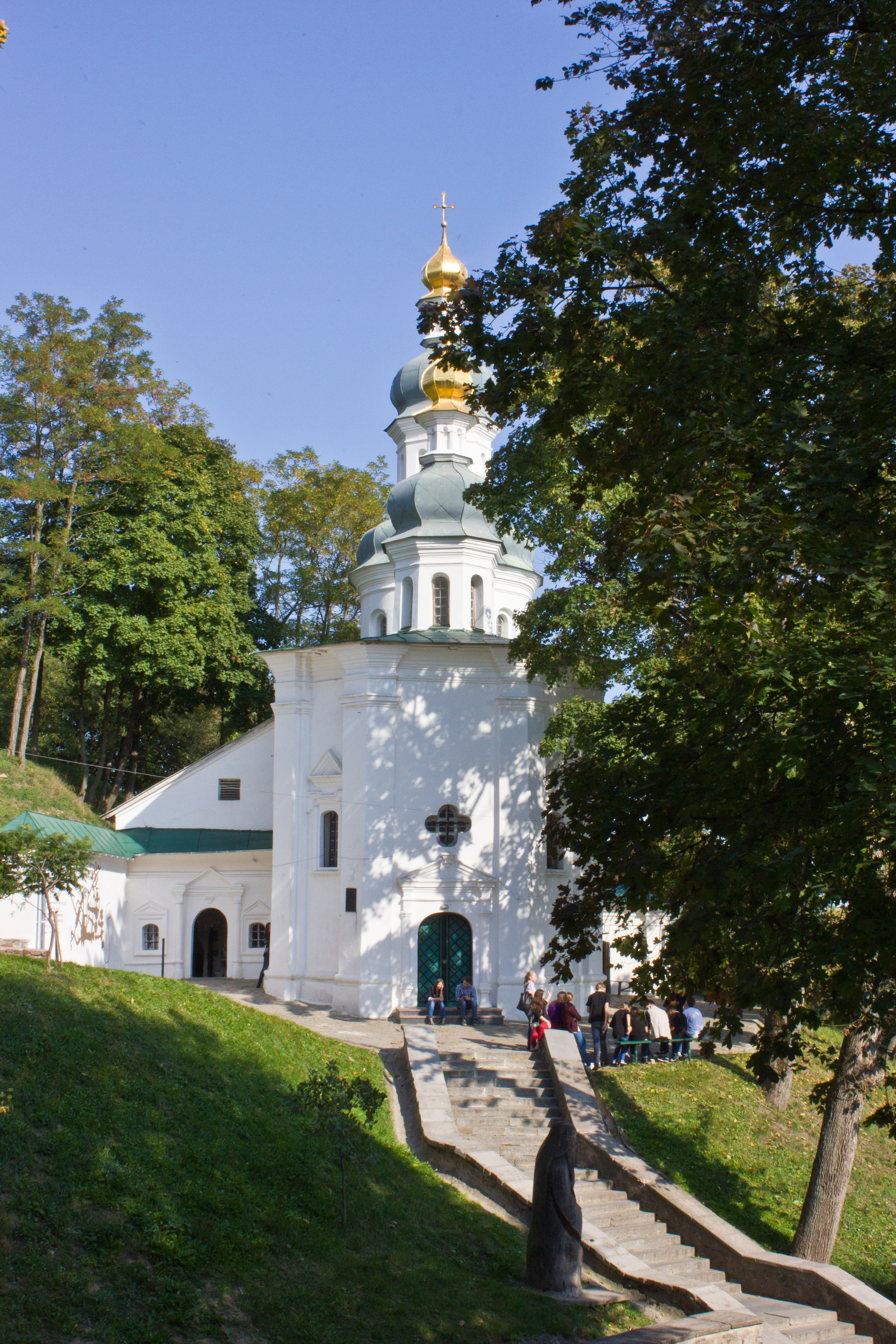

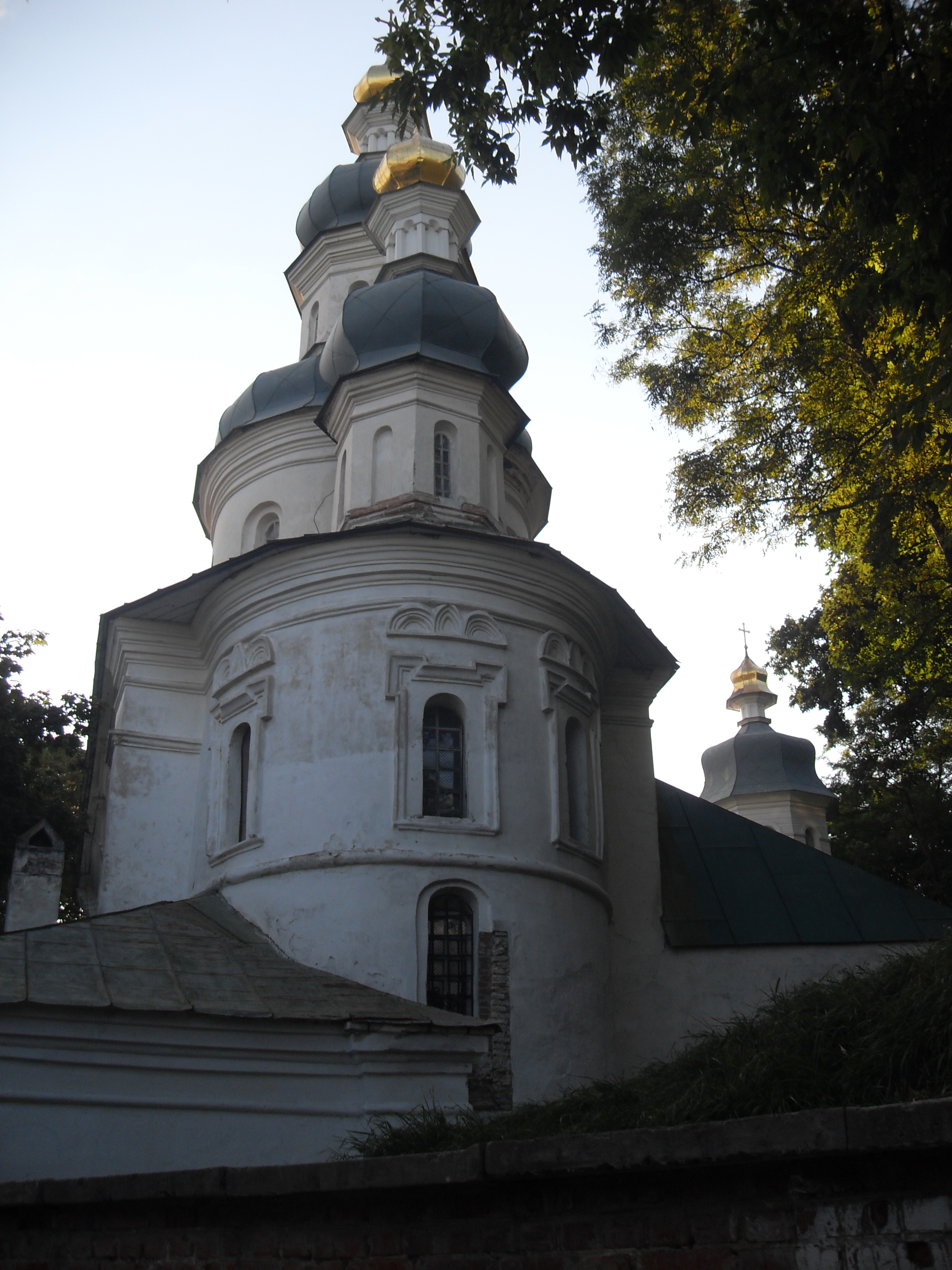

== See also ==
- List of churches and monasteries in Chernihiv
