= Trinity Monastery, Chernihiv =

Church building in Chernihiv, Ukraine

Trinity Monastery
- Троїцько-Іллінський монастир
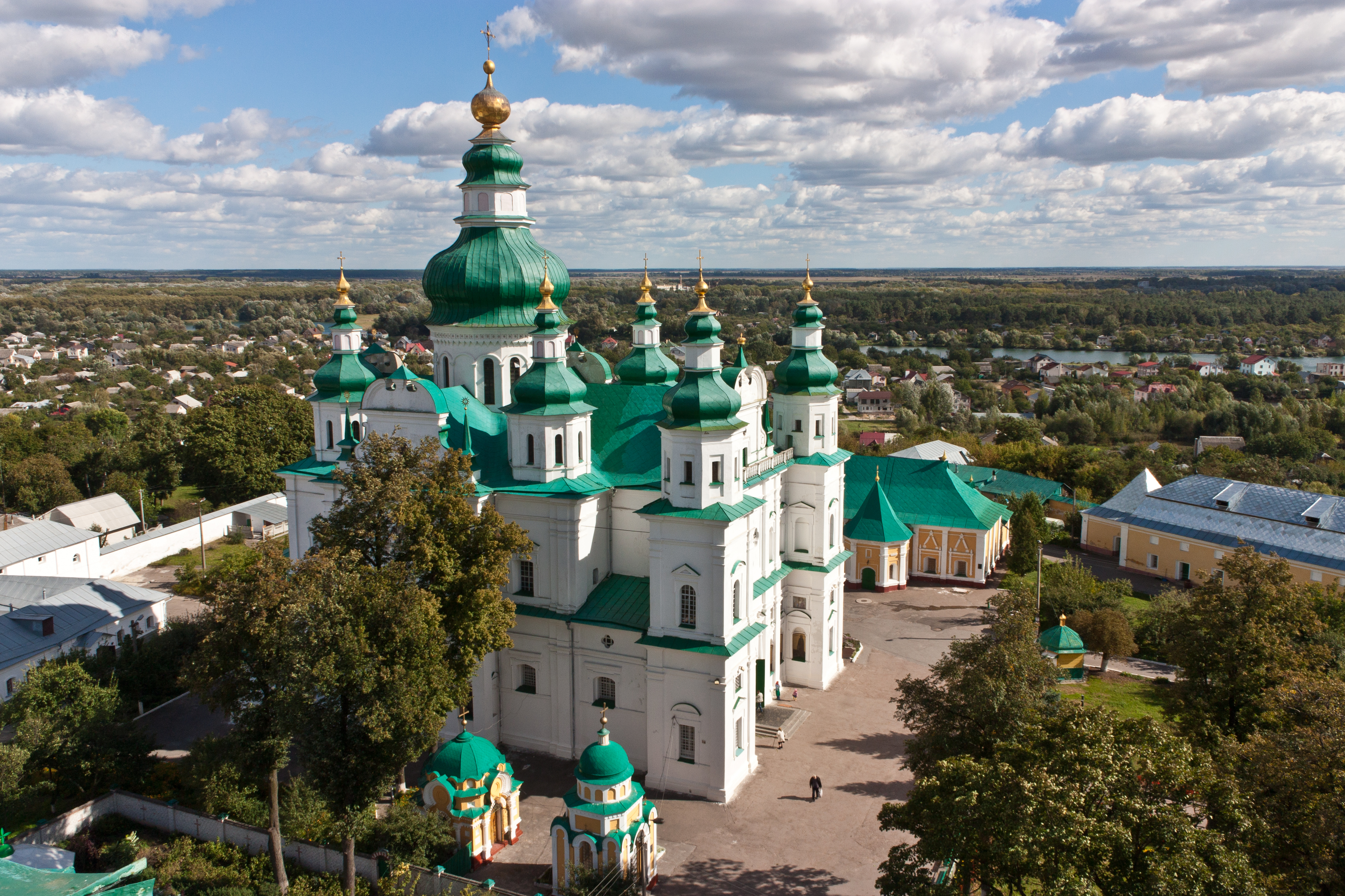
- The Baroque katholikon dating from the 1680s

Religion
- Affiliation: Eastern Orthodox Church
- Province: Chernihiv Oblast
- Ecclesiastical or organisational status: Cathedral
- Status: Active

Location
- Location: Chernihiv, Chernihiv Oblast, Ukraine
- Interactive map of Trinity Monastery
- Coordinates: 51°28′38″N 31°16′47″E

Architecture
- Type: Katholikon
- Style: Ukrainian Baroque
- Dome: 7

Website
- oldchernihiv.com/troyitskiy-sobor

Immovable Monument of National Significance of Ukraine
- Official name: Комплекс споруд Троїцько-Іллінського монастиря (Complex of buildings of the Trinity-Elijah Monastery)
- Type: History, Architecture
- Reference no.: 250044-Н

The Trinity Monastery (Ukrainian: Троїцько-Іллінський монастир) is a former Orthodox monastery in the city of Chernihiv in northeastern Ukraine.

== Description ==
The original monastery of St. Elijah the Prophet on Boldyna Hora seems to have been founded by Saint Anthony of Pechersk in the 11th century, but was abandoned after the Mongol invasion of 1239. It fell into disrepair in the 14th century, was partially destroyed, part of the passages and the temple with the church were filled up. One tiny church survives from that period.

The new Trinity monastery was founded nearby by Bishop Lazar Baranovych in 1649 as it was rebuilt in 1649 at the expense of Chernihiv Colonel Stepan Pobodail; from the second floor. The 17th century was the department of Chernihiv archbishops. In the neighbouring city of Novhorod-Siverskyi, Baranovych founded a printing press, which was rare at the time. He later transferred the printing press to the Trinity Monastery. The monastery's adjacent printing press was famed for their production of engravings, while its library was famed for containing more than 11,000 books.

The main church, or the katholikon, was constructed between 1679 and 1695 to designs by Johann Baptist Sauer, a master builder from Wilno. This church has seven pear-shaped cupolas. It is considered a high point of Ukrainian Baroque architecture (as practiced under the auspices of Hetman Ivan Mazepa).

After the monastery was closed in 1786, the Trinity Cathedral was considerably rebuilt, losing four domes and most Baroque details. In 1942, a nunnery was established. The monastery operated as a maiden vow until 1962. Its current appearance is the result of a 1980s reconstruction campaign. It has been the seat of a local bishopric since 1991.

In 1679, the Novgorod-Siversky printing house was transferred to the monastery. At the initiative of Archbishop Lazar Baranovich, at the expense of Chernihiv Colonel Vasyl Dunin-Borkovsky, with the help of Hetman Ivan Mazepa, built in 1679-1689 (1695 finally) by the Great Cathedral of the Holy Trinity, and since then called the monastery Trinity-Ilyinsky.

In 1786, the monastery was closed and turned into a bishop's house. Under Soviet rule, the monastery, as a church center, was liquidated.

From construction have remained and operate for the purpose:

- Church of St. Elijah (second half of the 12th century);
- Holy Trinity Cathedral (work of architect Ivan Baptista);
- Vvedenska Refectory Church (1677–1679);
- The bell tower (1775).

On the territory of the monastery, near the Holy Trinity Cathedral, is the grave of Leonid Ivanovich Glibov. Not far away, on Boldyni Hory, is the tomb of Mykhailo Kotsiubynskyi.

== Transport ==
- Trolleybus № 8.
- bus / march. taxi routes № 27.

== Gallery ==
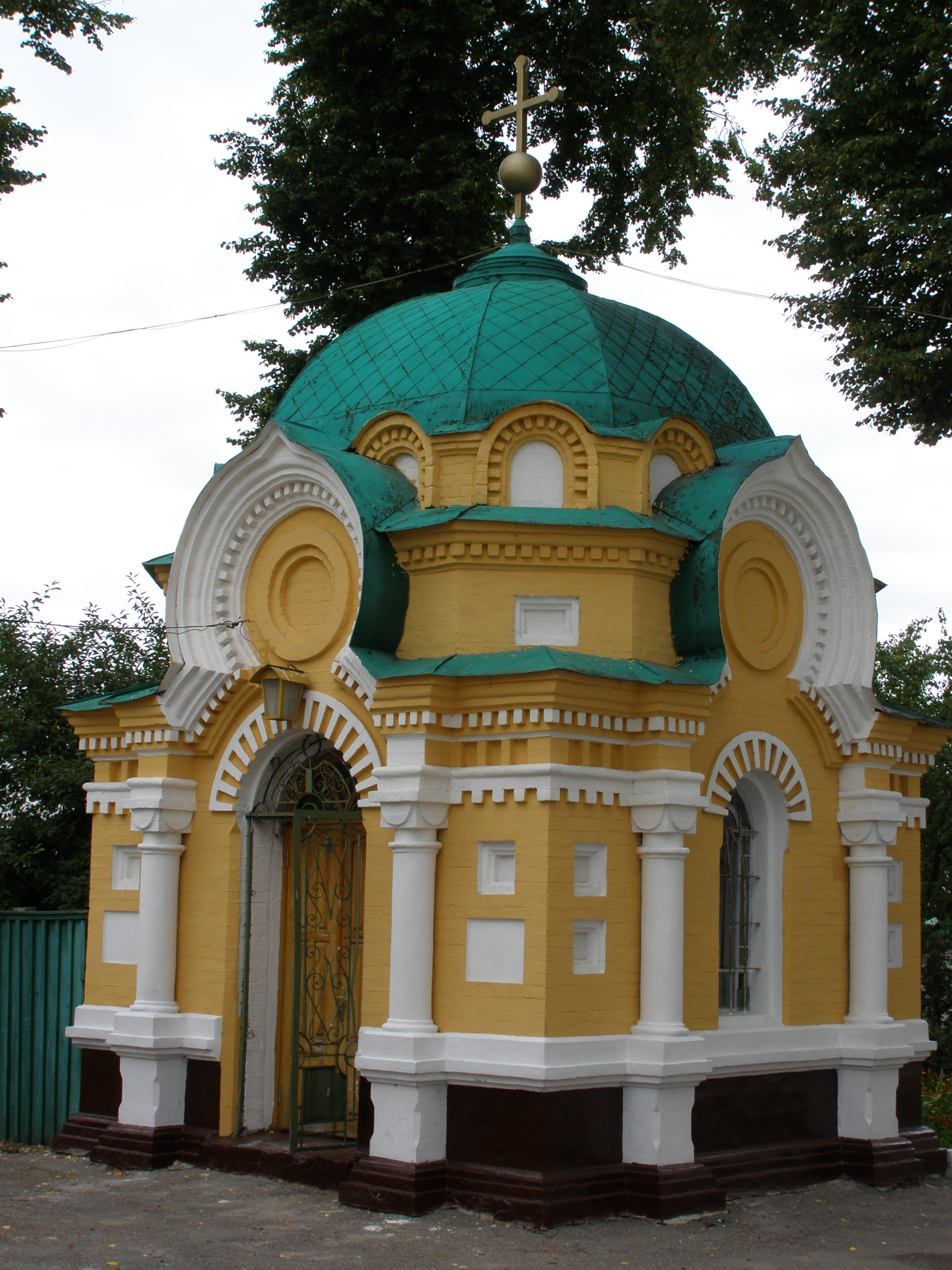

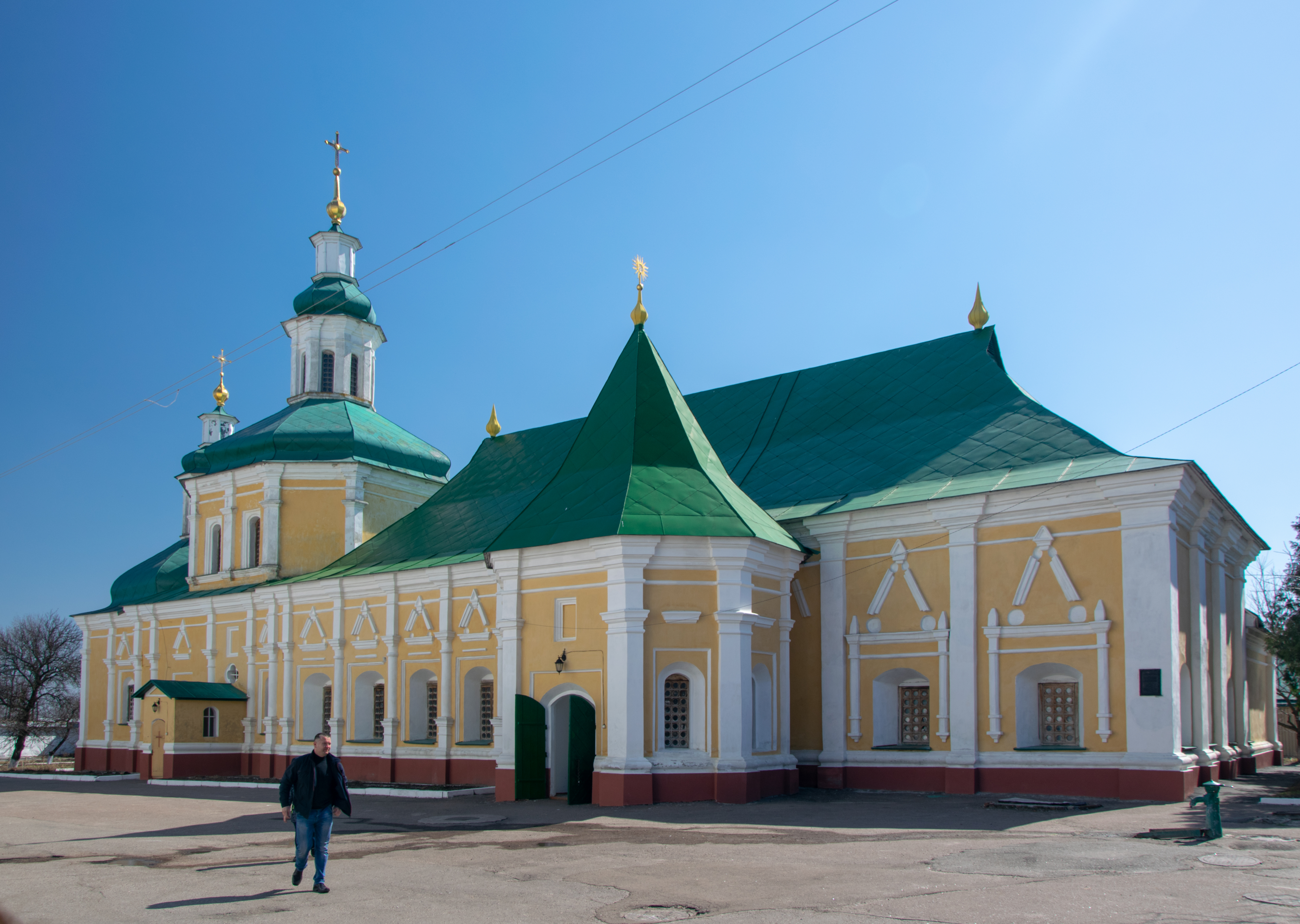

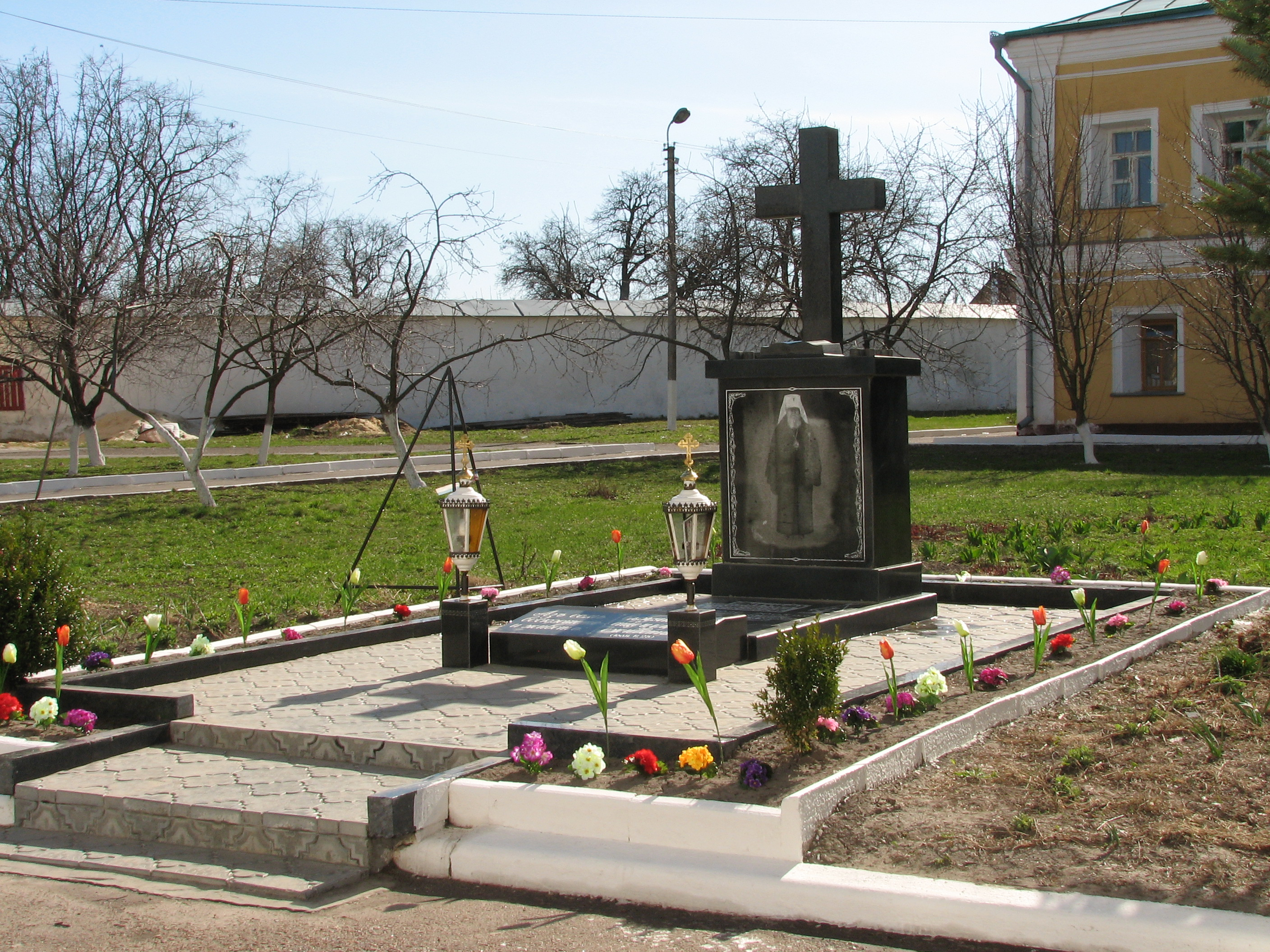

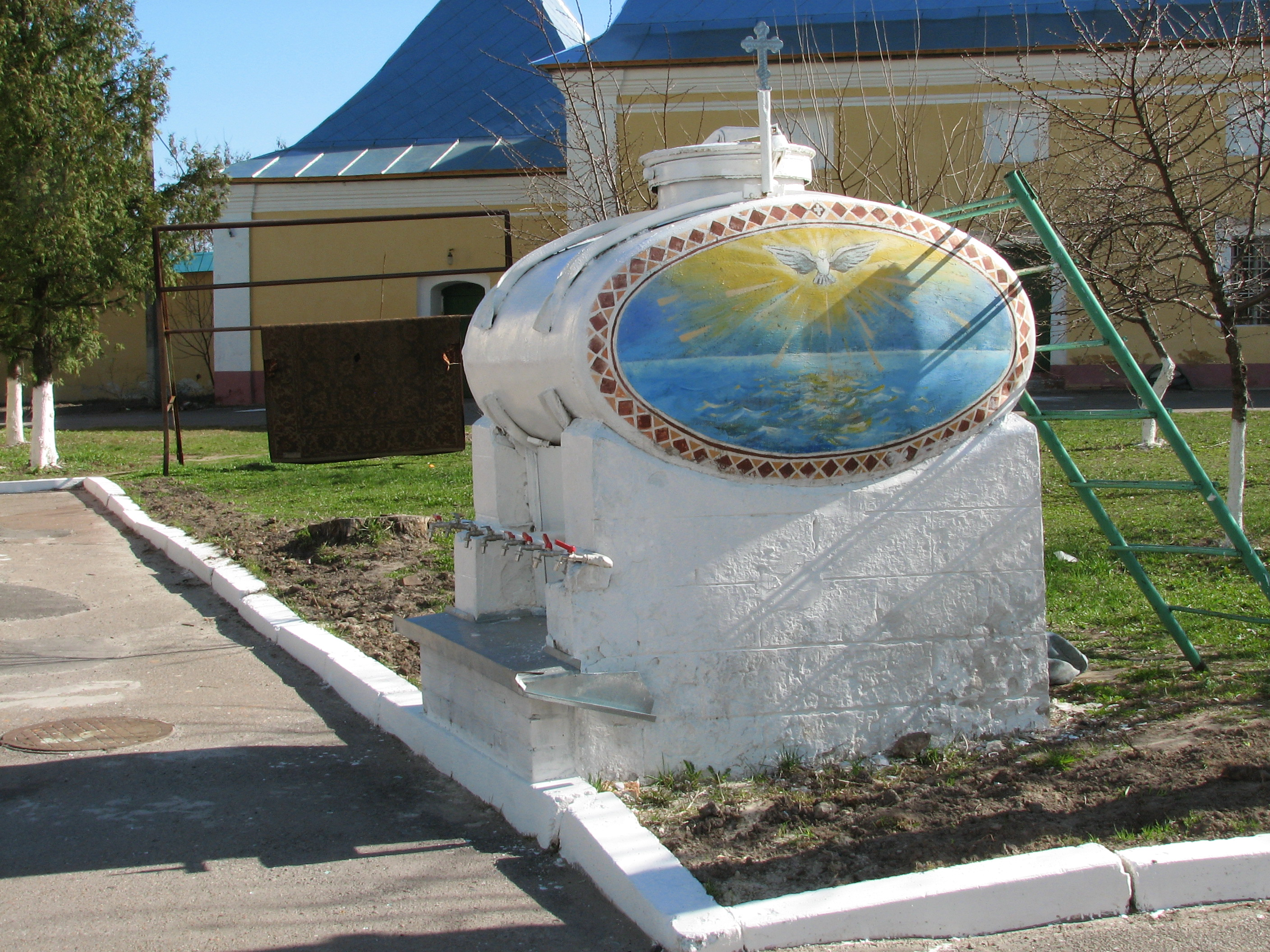

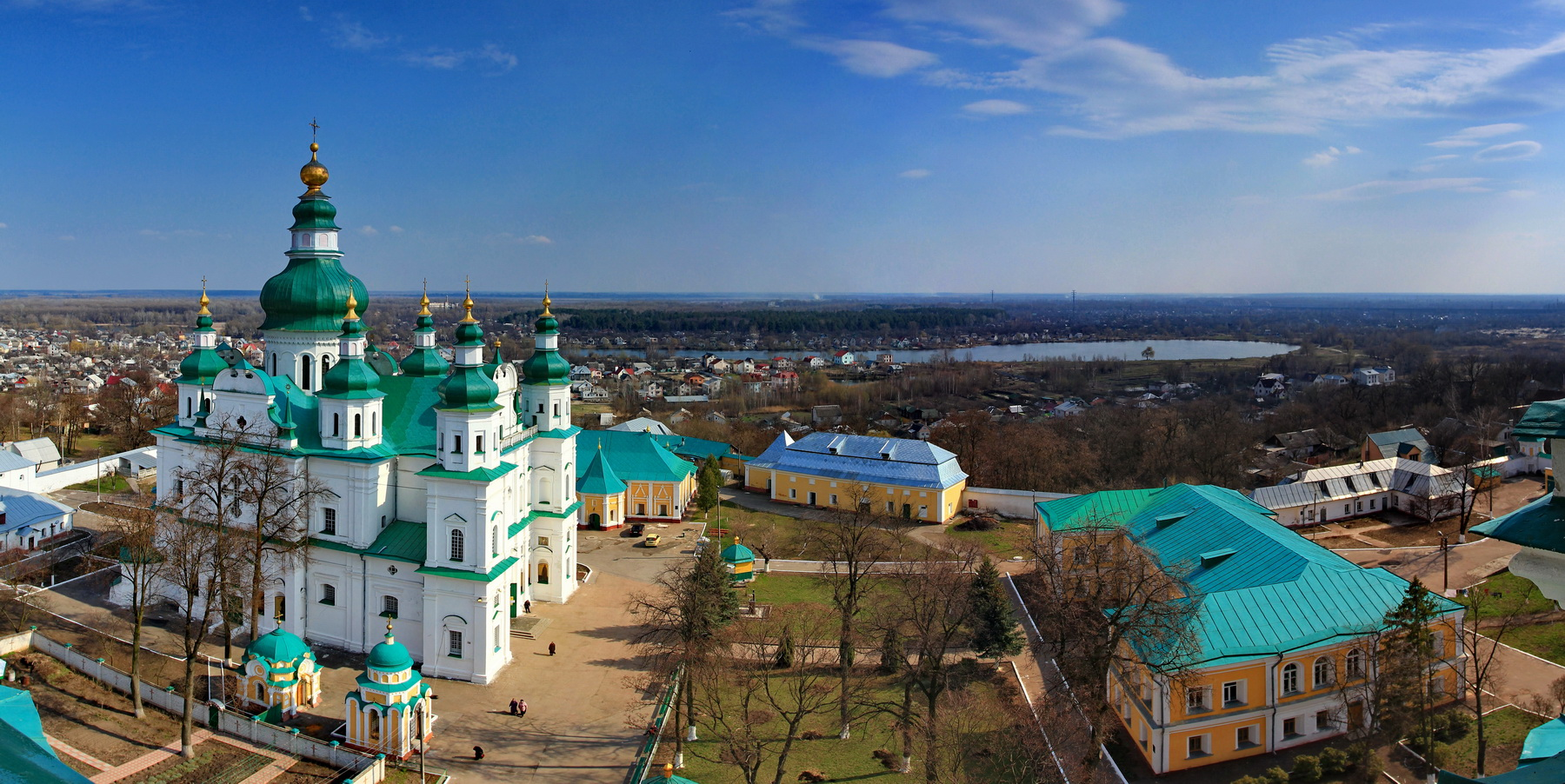

== See also ==
- List of churches and monasteries in Chernihiv
