= Boldyni Hory =

- Болдині гори
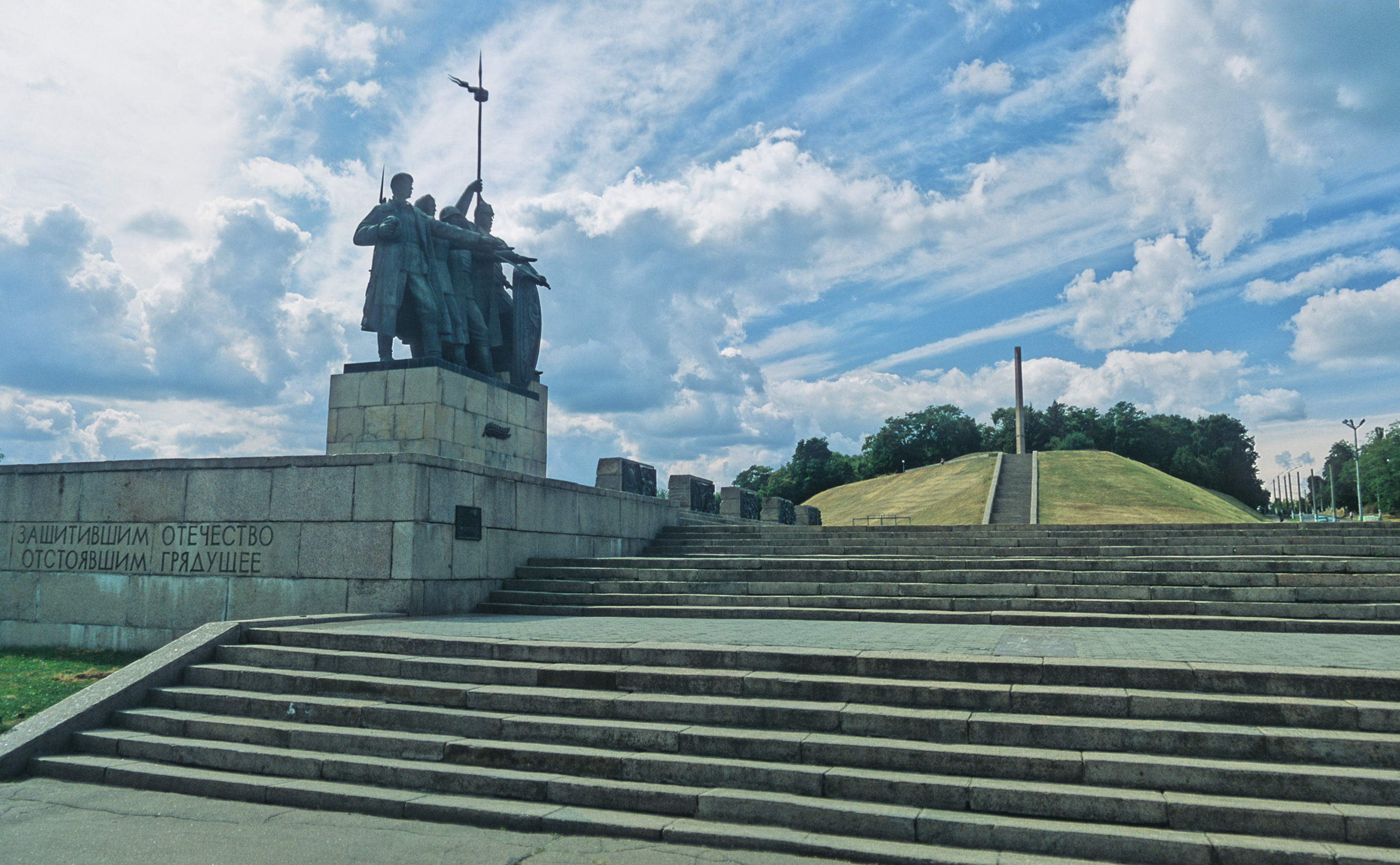

General information
- Type: National monument
- Location: Novozavodskyi District, Chernihiv, Chernihiv Oblast, Ukraine
- Coordinates: 51°28′44″N 31°17′04″E
- Elevation: 35 meters
- Completed: 1986
- Inaugurated: 9 September 1958

Design and construction
- Structural engineer: M.V Chernov (architect) and Yu. M. Lokhovinin (sculptor)

Immovable Monument of National Significance of Ukraine
- Official name: Курганний могильник "Болдині Гори" (Boldyni Hory kurgan grave field)
- Type: Archaeology
- Reference no.: 250002-Н

Boldyni Hory or Boldyni Hills is a historical area in the city of Chernihiv, Ukraine on the right bank of the Desna, as well as a monument of landscape art (since 1972). Boldyni Hory are located two kilometers from the historic center of Chernihiv. From the center of Chernihiv one can walk or take public transport to Tolstoy street. The monuments are formed from 20 to 35-meter hills developed by an arc south of the floodplain of the Stryzhen River. The area has long been inhabited, many archeological, historical and architectural monuments have been preserved on its territory.

== Name ==
There are several versions of what "Boldyni" means:

- formed from the ancient Slavic word bold, supposedly meaning "oak", although no dictionary contains the word bold with this translation;
- from the Ruthenian word boldy, meaning "hills";
- a Turkism, formed from balda / balta, meaning "axe".

== Description and history ==
Located on the Boldyni Hills on an area of 1.2 ha, the kurgan complex is one of the largest known to science in Ukraine necropolises of the 9th–11th centuries. It consists of 6 mound groups, with a total of about 230 mounds surrviving, defining the populated area. One of the largest—the Hulbyshche kurgan—is located in the northeastern part of the necropolis, has a height of 6 m (in ancient times 8.5 m), and a diameter of 22 m. Next to it is the Bezimennyi (Nameless) kurgan, which according to Professor Boris Rybakov belongs to the first half of 10th century. The mounds of the Boldyni Hory were studied in 1872 and 1908 by D. Y. Samokvasov, and in 1965 by S. S. Shirinsky.

In the middle of the 11th century, the monk Anthony the Reverend came to Boldyna Hill and founded earthen structures, the so-called Saint Anthony Caves. They are connected by underground passages with the Church of St. Elijah, which was built in the XII century. In 1654, a colleague of Hetman Bohdan Khmelnytsky, Colonel Stefan Podobail of Chernihiv, was buried in the Saint Anthony Caves.

The landmark of the architectural ensemble of the Trinity-Elijah Monastery—the Trinity Monastery—iwas built in the late 17th century. In 1667, a tenement house was built on the site of the eastern gate of the monastery for the printing house of the Trinity-Elijah Monastery.

In the tomb of the Trinity Cathedral among the Chernihiv bishops is the body of the author of a multi-volume historical and statistical description of the Chernihiv diocese Filaret (Gumilevsky), in the west wing of the church – at rest the general, participant in the Russo-Turkish war of 1877–78, historian and public figure, chairman of Chernihiv archival commission Hryhoriy Myloradovych. Not far from the cathedral under the green crowns stands a chapel in which is buried a prominent Russian diplomat, a native of Chernihiv Grigory Shcherbin.

Next to the monastery is a cemetery where prominent Ukrainians are buried (their graves have been preserved) – Ukrainian biker and lyre player Leonid Glibov; famous Ukrainian writer Mykhailo Kotsiubynsky (and his relatives – wife Vira Ustymivna, mother Glykeriya Maksymovna, sister Lidia Mykhailivna); Ukrainian folklorist and ethnographer Opanas Markevych, husband of the writer Marko Vovchok; writer and public figure Mykola Verbytsky.

On the eve of Victory Day, May 8, 1986, the memorial of Glory was unveiled in the lower reaches of the Boldyni Hory. Four majestic figures froze on the granite pedestal in bronze: an ancient Rus' warrior in a helmet with a sword and spear and a shield depicting the ancient coat of arms of Chernihiv, a soldier of World War II, a national avenger and a working woman. Along with 5 granite stelae, bronze bas-reliefs reflect the labor, heroic and victorious history of the Chernihiv region: the march on Prince Igor Svyatoslavovich's Polovtsians, heroic episodes of the period of the so-called "Great October", civil and World War II, and guerrilla warfare. At present, Boldyni Hory is a monument of garden and park art, a valuable historical and architectural complex, as well as a significant tourist attraction of the city and the region.

== See also ==
- Saint Anthony Caves
- Trinity Cathedral Monastery

== Gallery ==
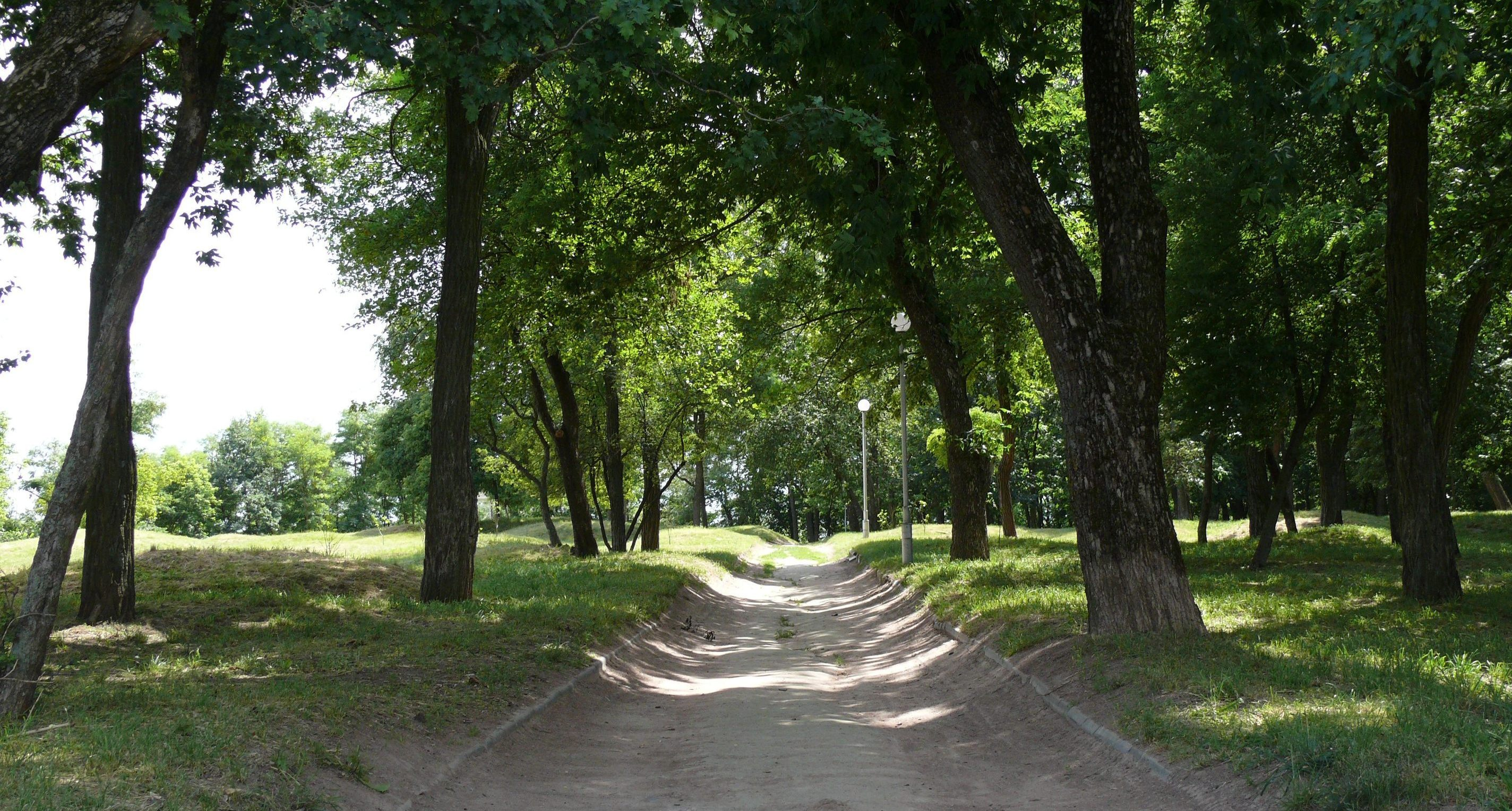
A path in the park

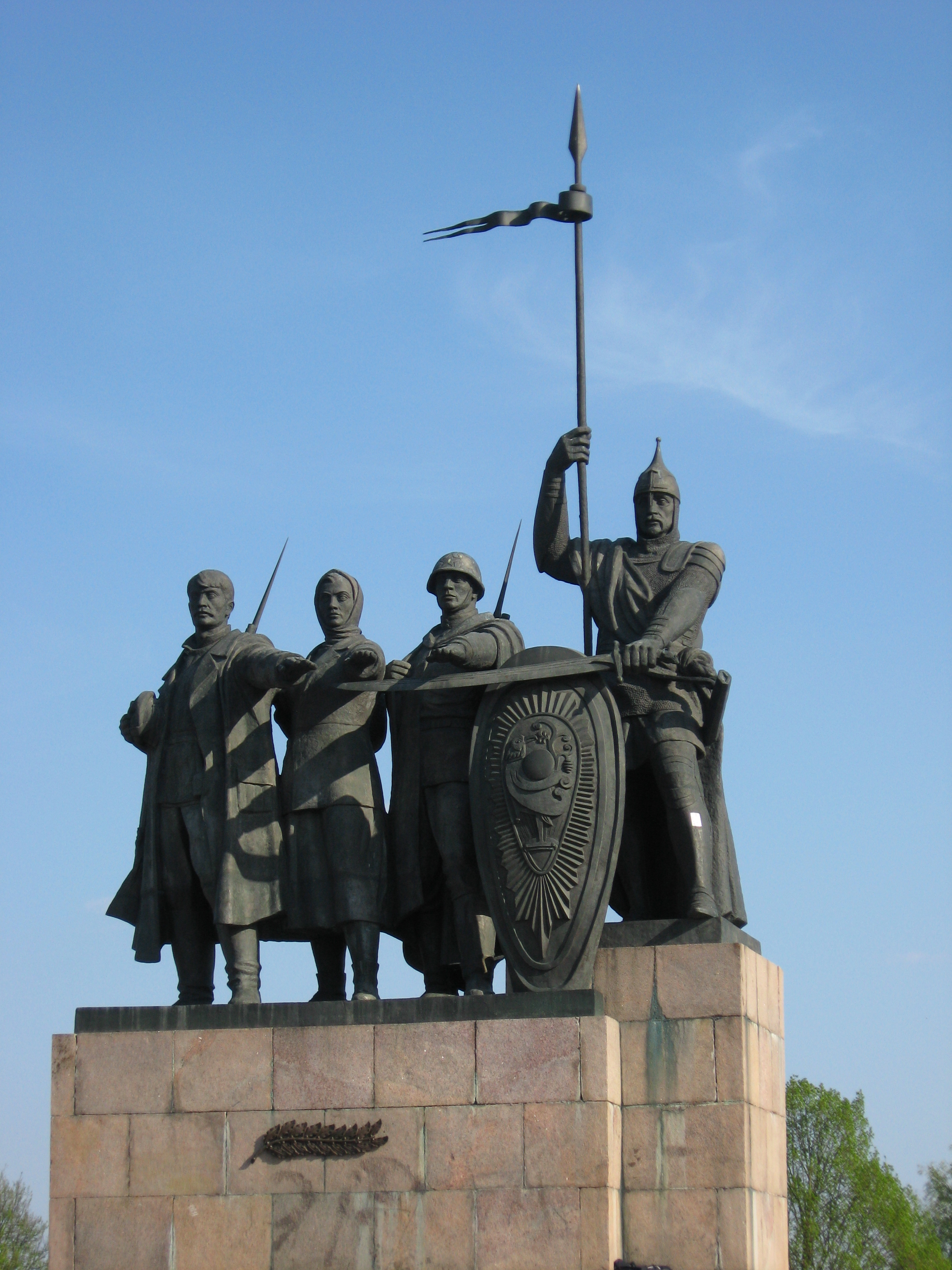
The Glory Memorial

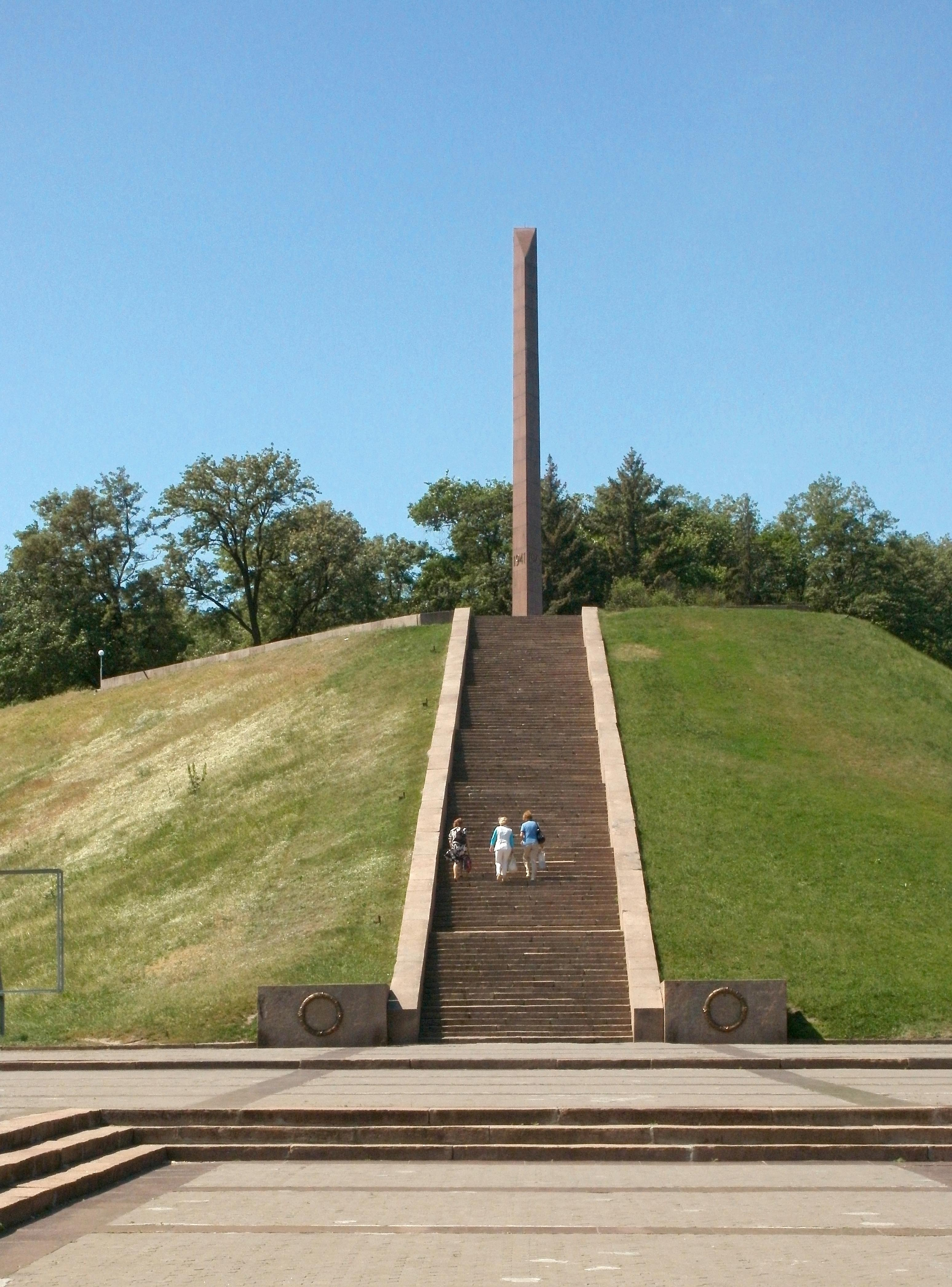
The Obelisk

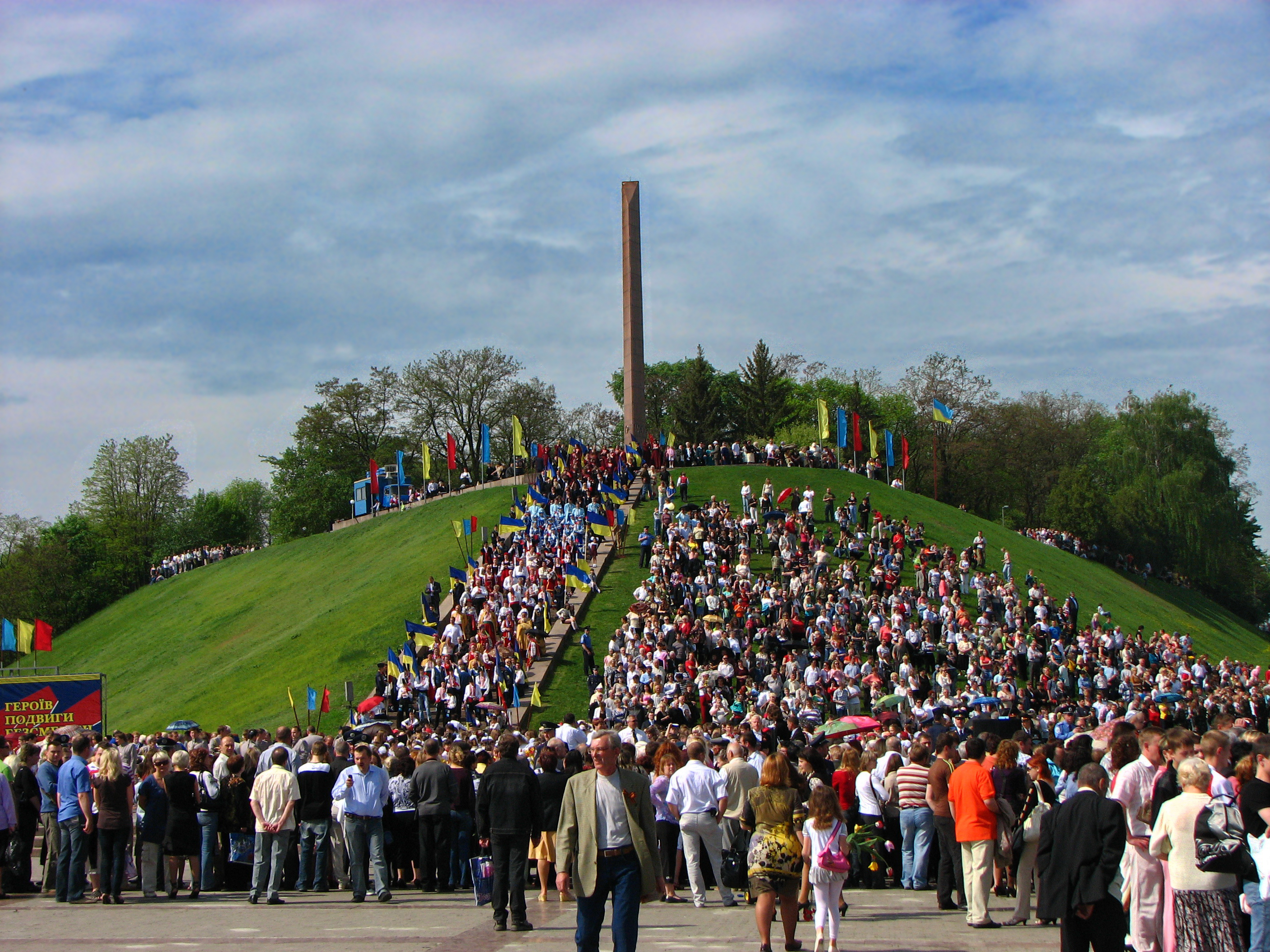
65th anniversary of Victory

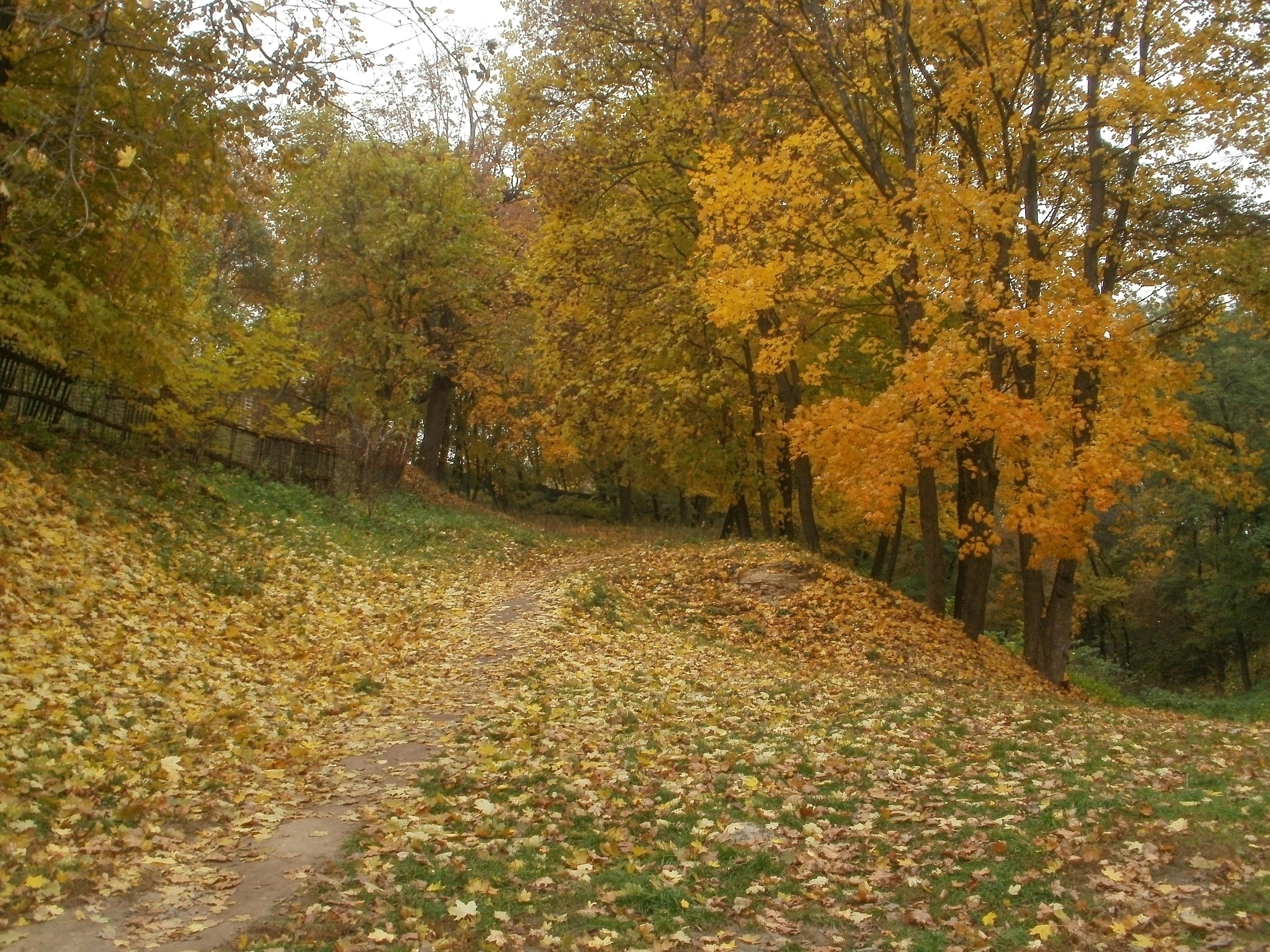
In autumn

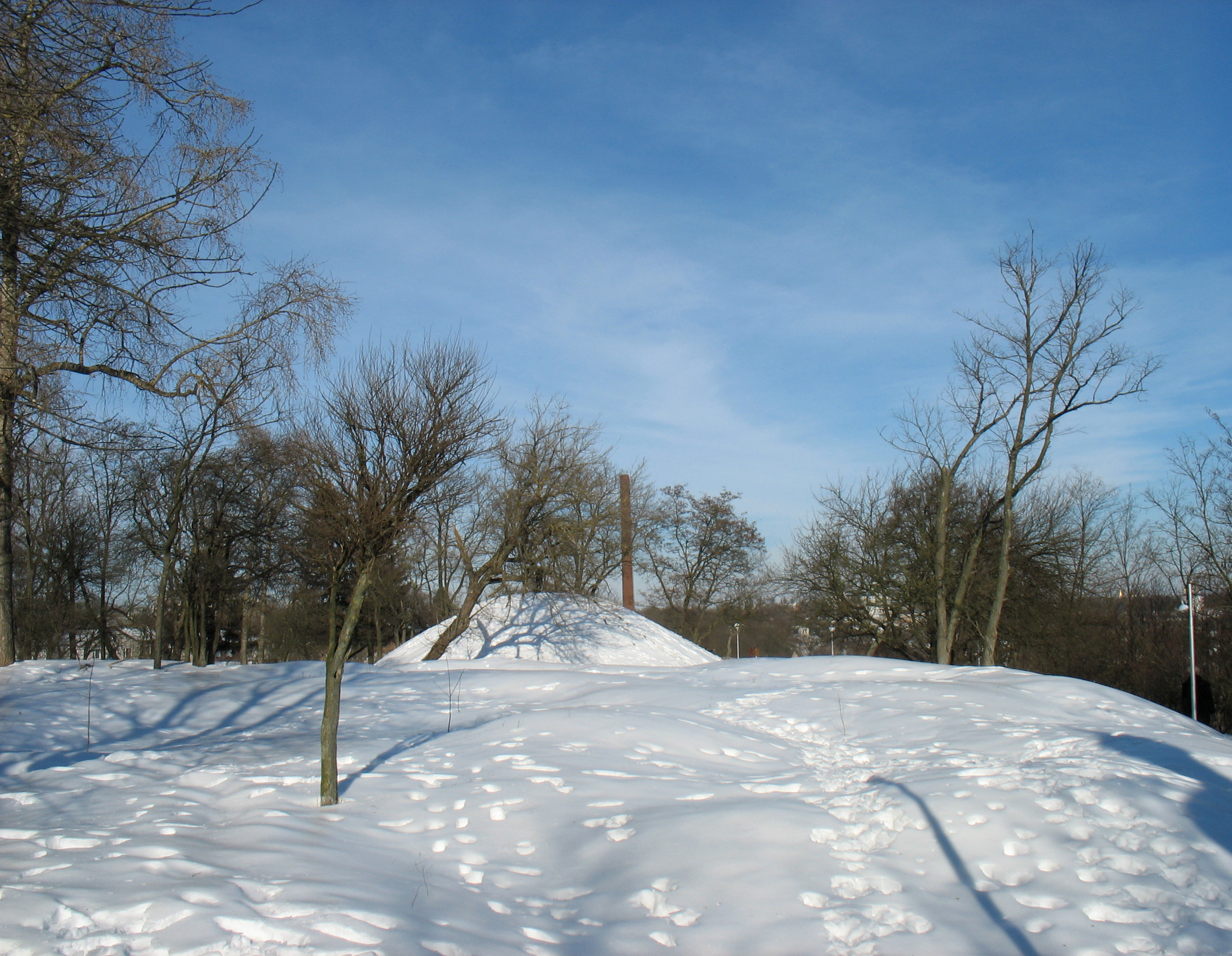
In winter

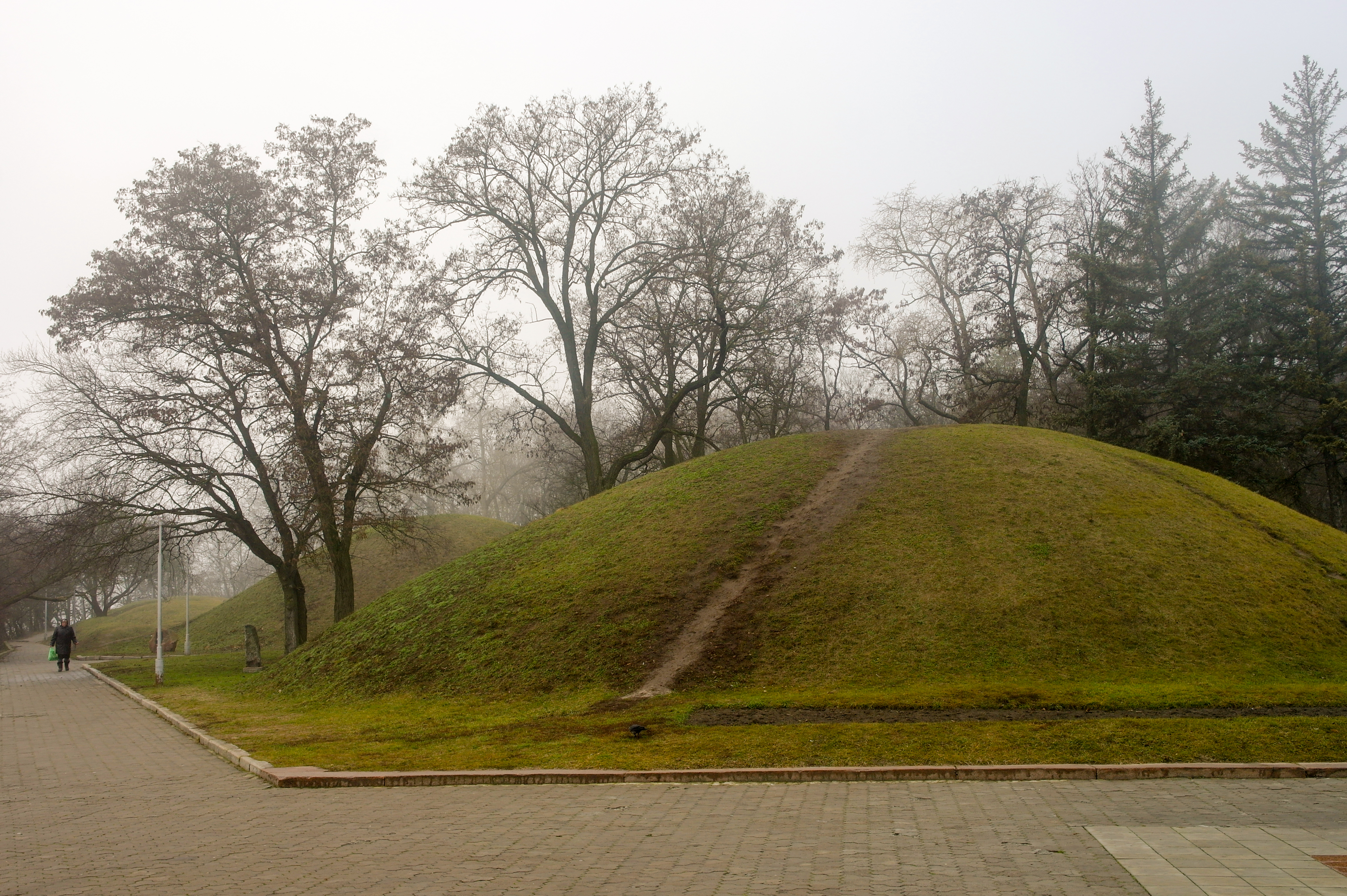
View of the kurgans

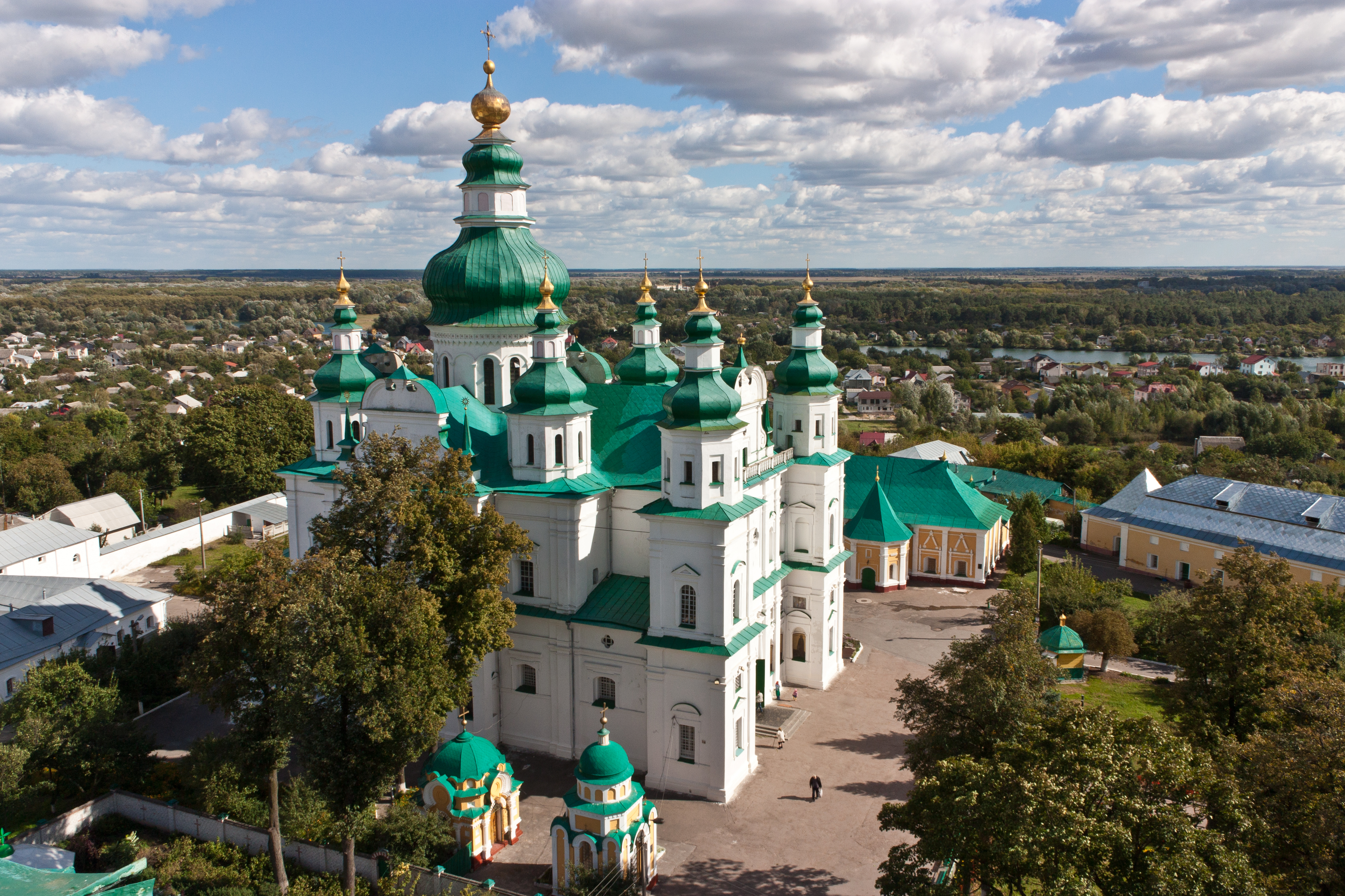
Trinity Monastery

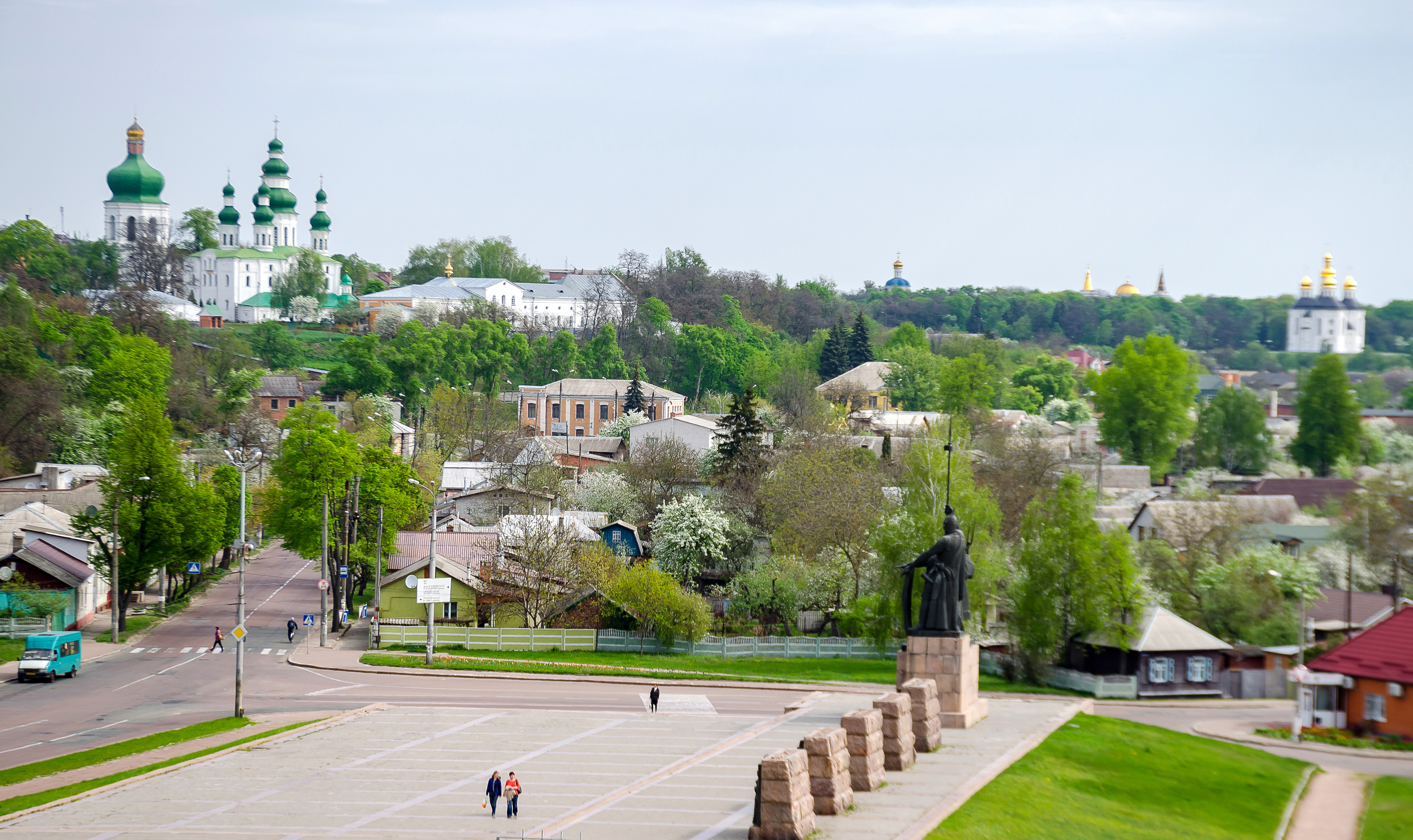
View of the Yelets Dormition Monastery

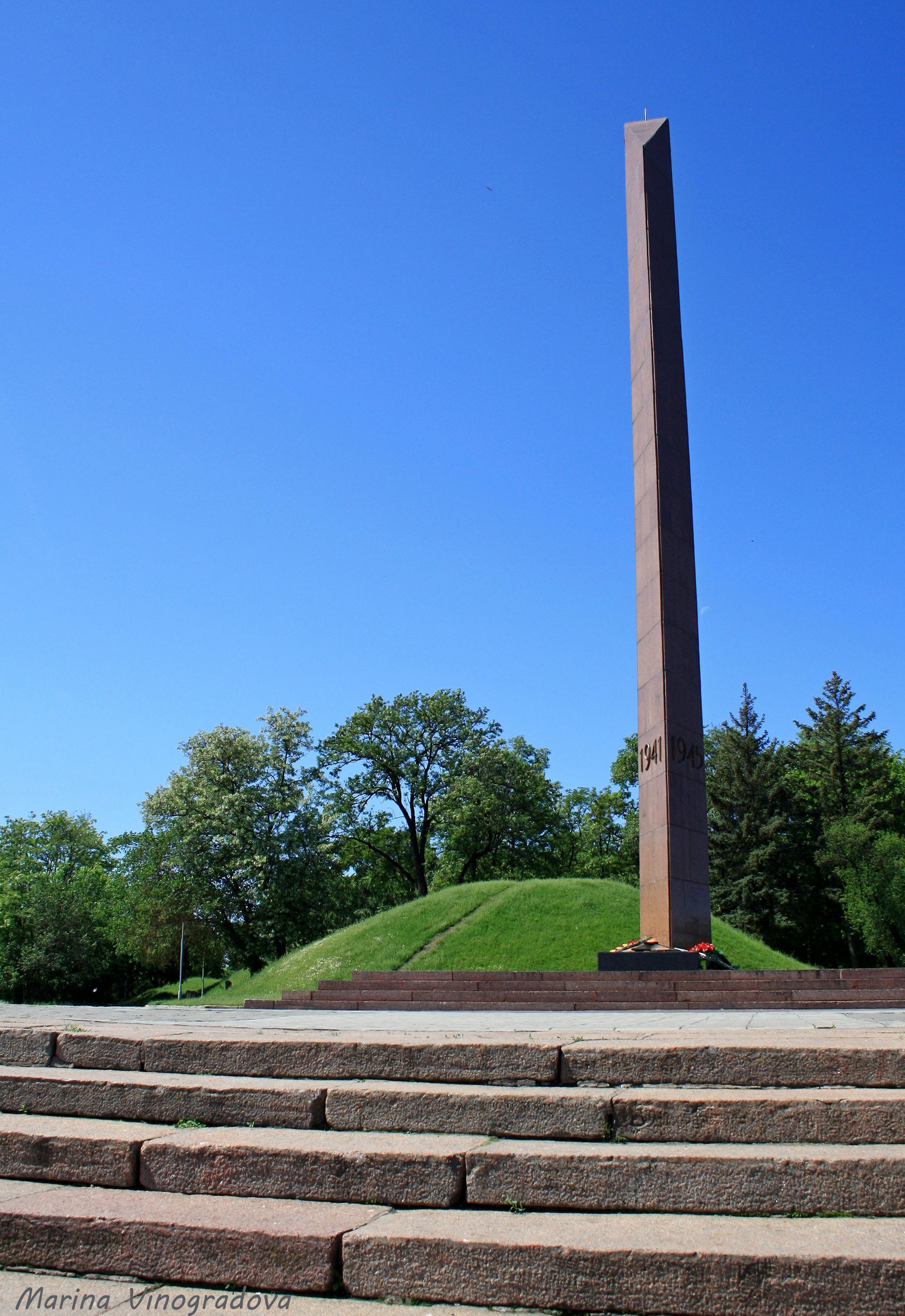

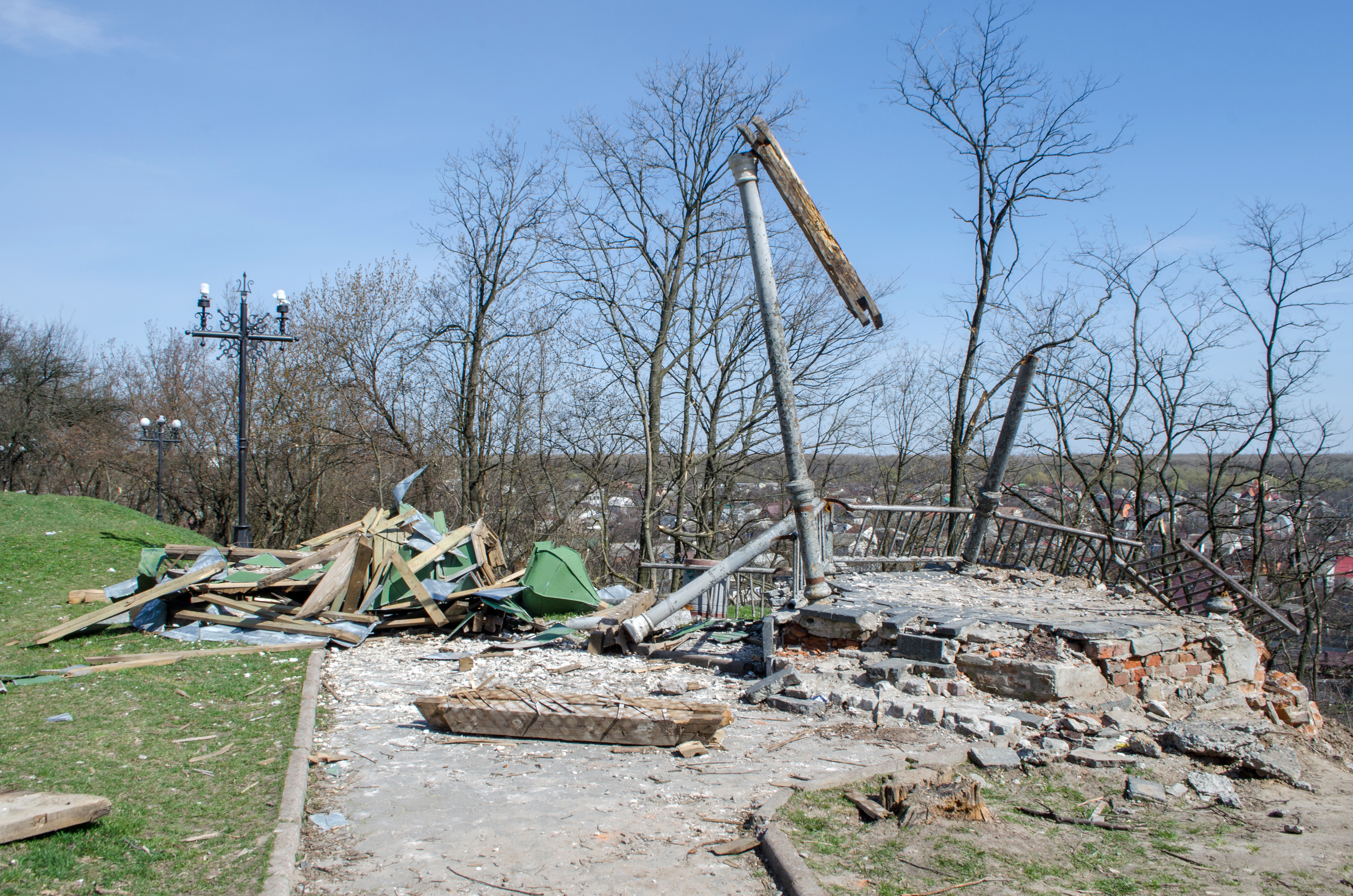
Gazebo on the Boldyni Hory, destroyed by Russian bombings
