= Saint Anthony's Caves =

Cave monastery in Chernihiv, Ukraine

- Антонієві печери
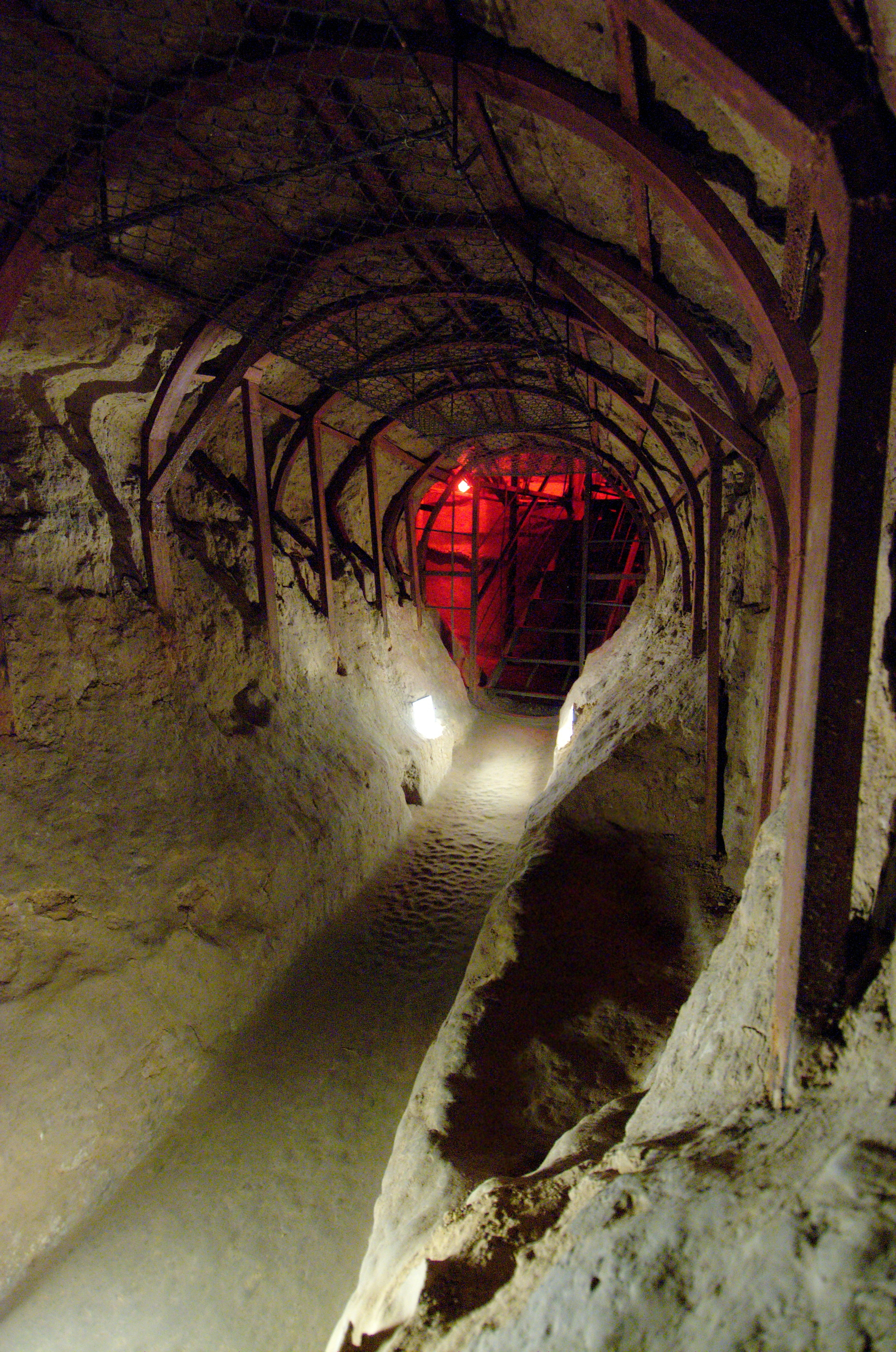

General information
- Status: Monument of the Cultural Heritage of Ukraine
- Location: Chernihiv, Ukraine
- Coordinates: 51°28′44″N 31°17′04″E
- Construction started: c. 1069

Immovable Monument of National Significance of Ukraine
- Official name: Печери, підземні церкви та інші підземні споруди (Антонієві печери) (Caves, underground churches and other underground structures (St. Anthony's Caves))
- Type: Architecture
- Reference no.: 250053/3

Saint Anthony's caves is a cave monastery in Chernihiv, Ukraine. It is home to Feodosiy Totemskyi Church, the largest underground church in Ukraine.

== History ==
The history of Saint Anthony's caves in Chernihiv, Ukraine started in the second half of the tenth century when Anthony of Kiev came to Boldyni Hory, where he dug out a cave for solitude and prayers. Boldyni Hory was considered a sacred place in pre-Christian times, as there were. Chernihiv and Kyiv were the largest centers of the Kievan Rus', and they faced constant confrontations. To keep up with Kyiv's pace, the first church of the contemporary Trinity Monastery complex appeared a century later. The total length of the Chernihiv underground premises is about 350 meters (1148 feet).

== See also ==
- Near Caves of the Kyiv Pechersk Lavra system

== Gallery ==
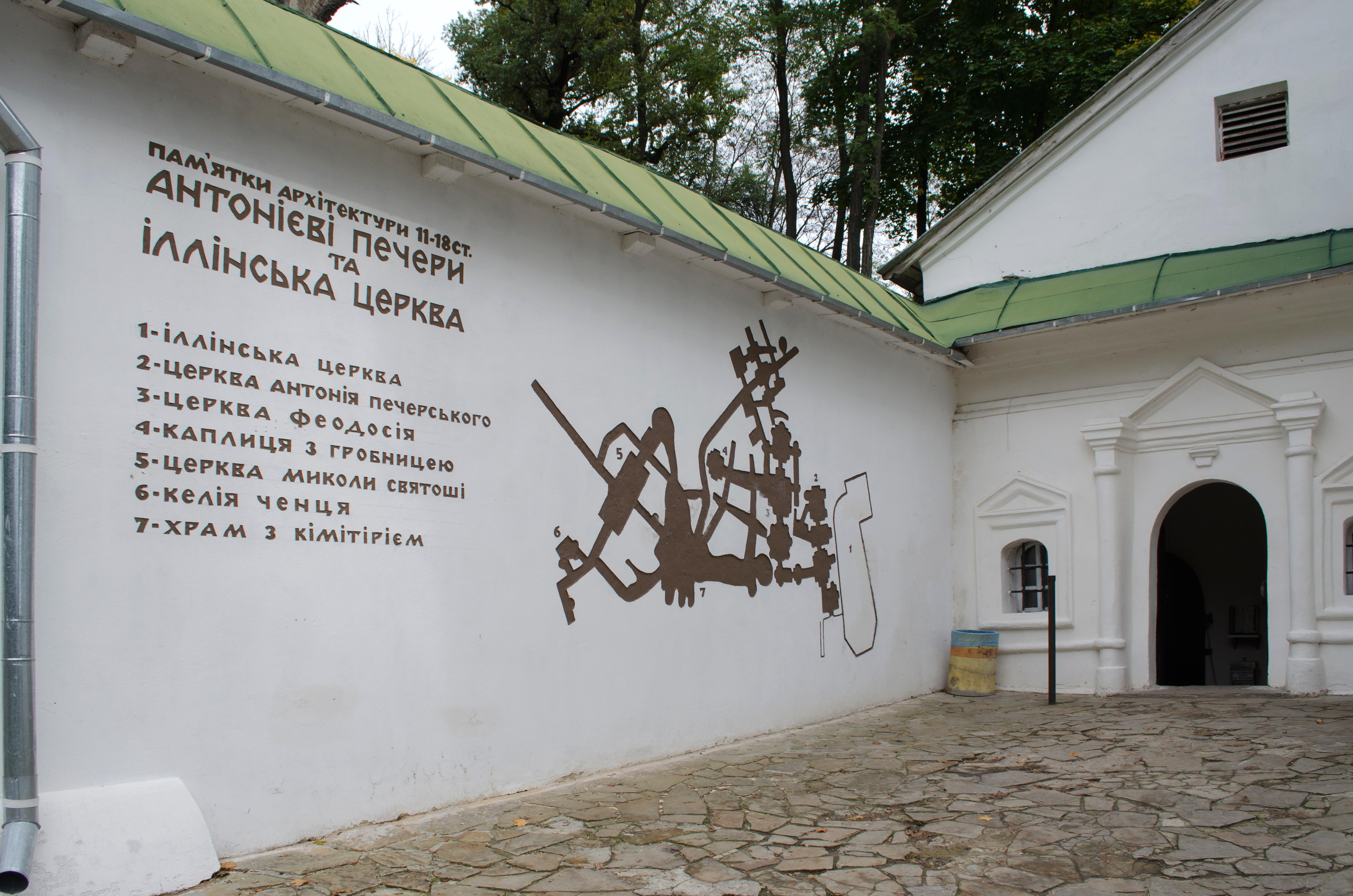

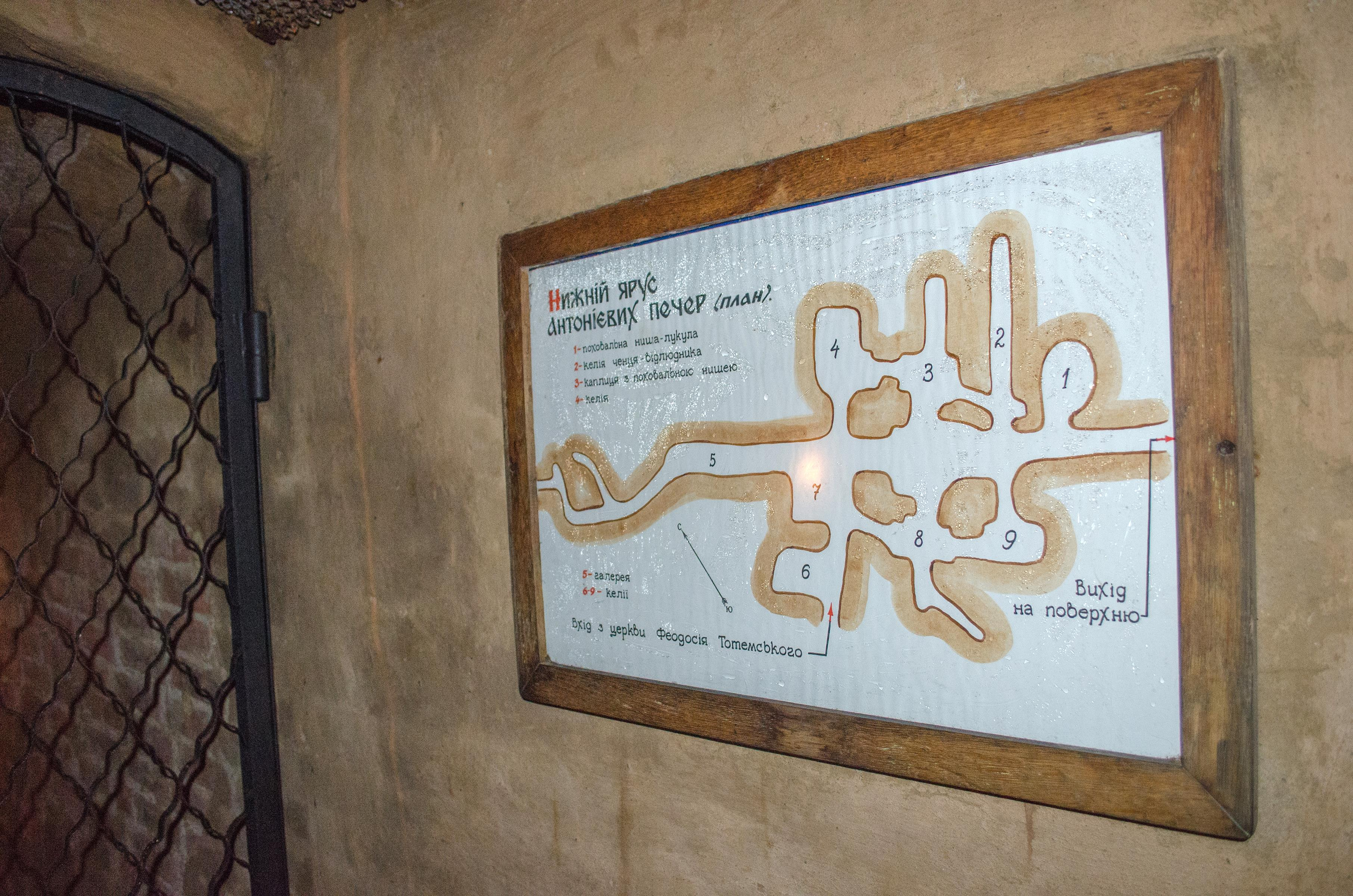

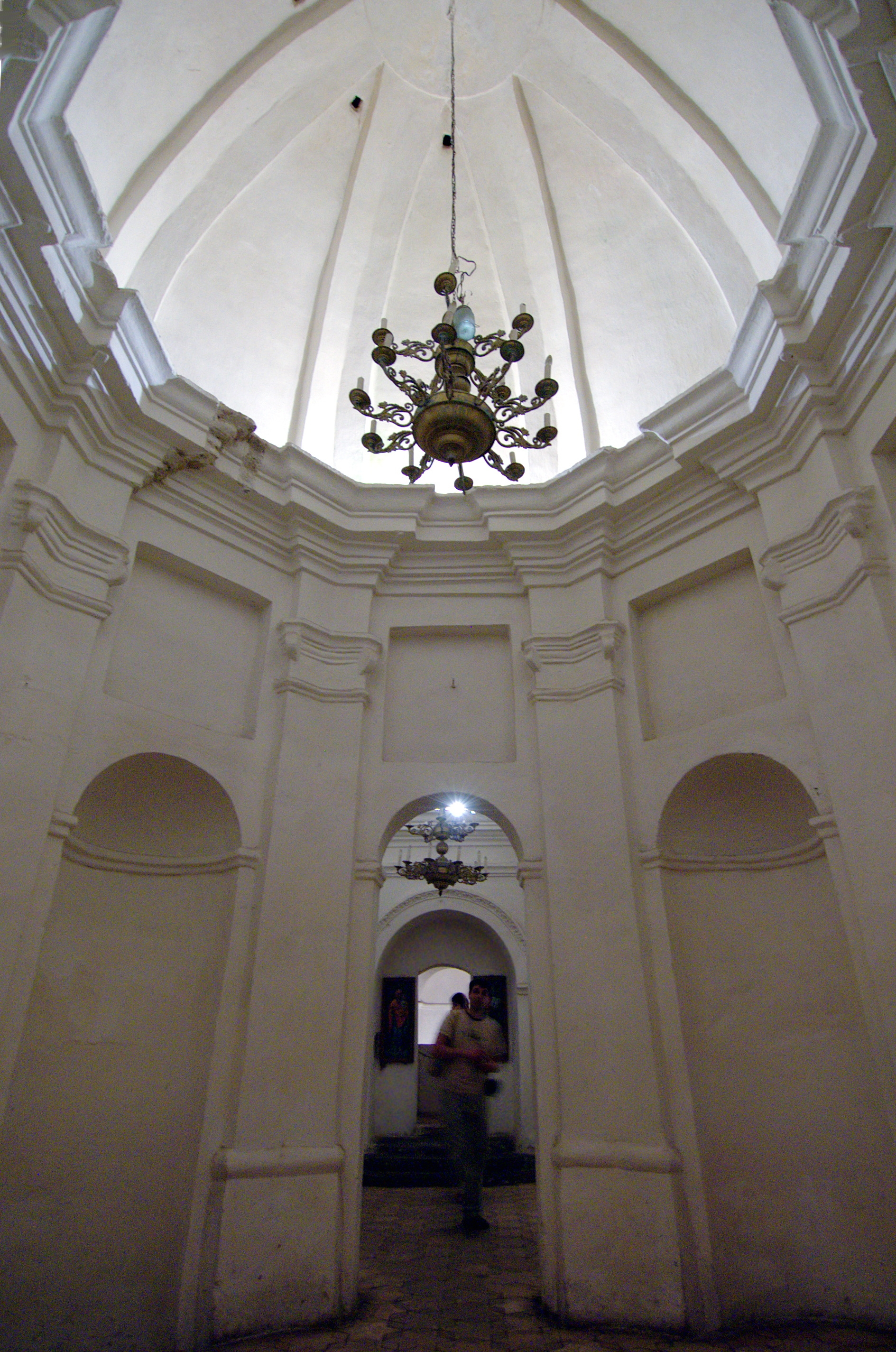

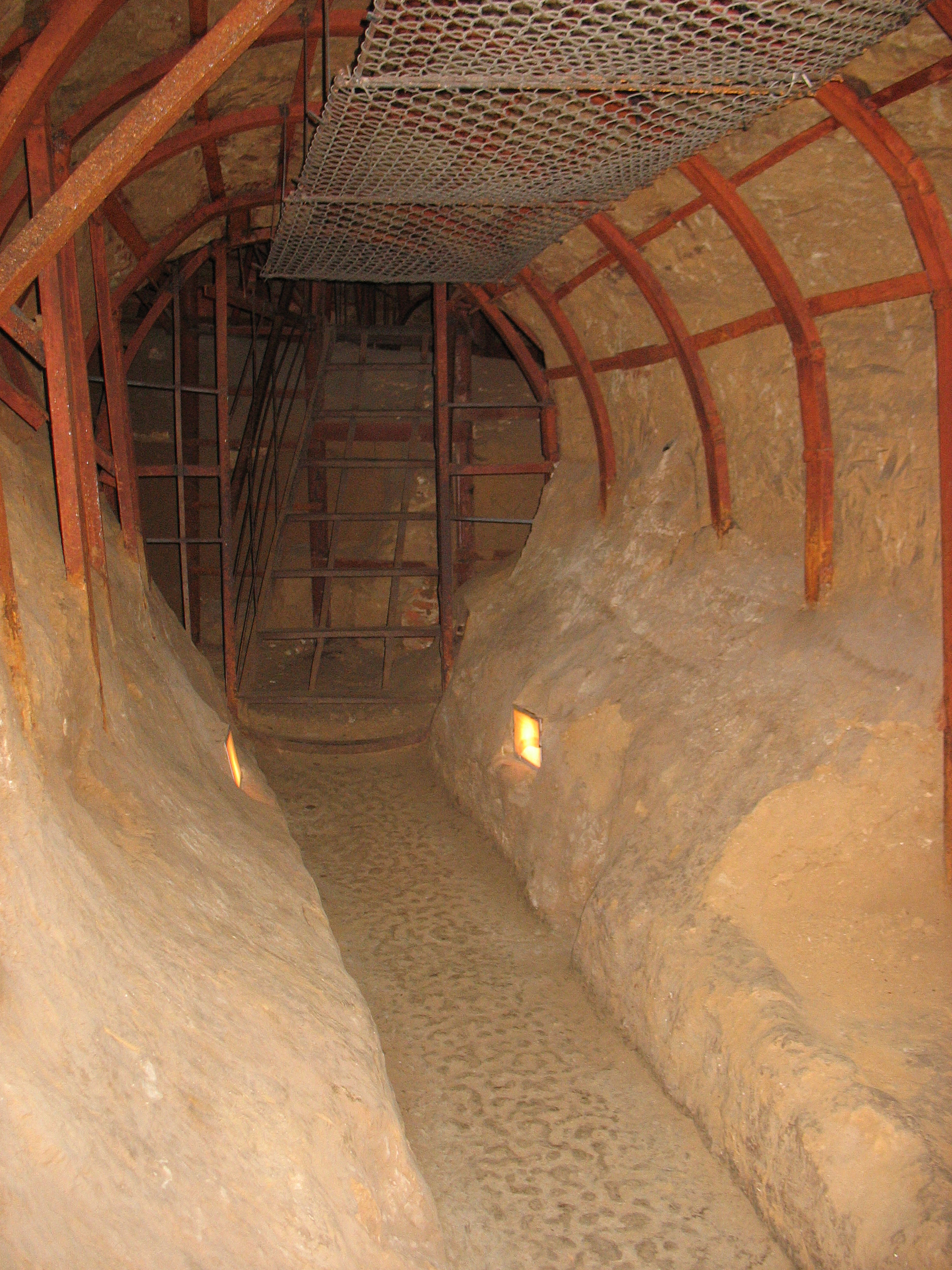

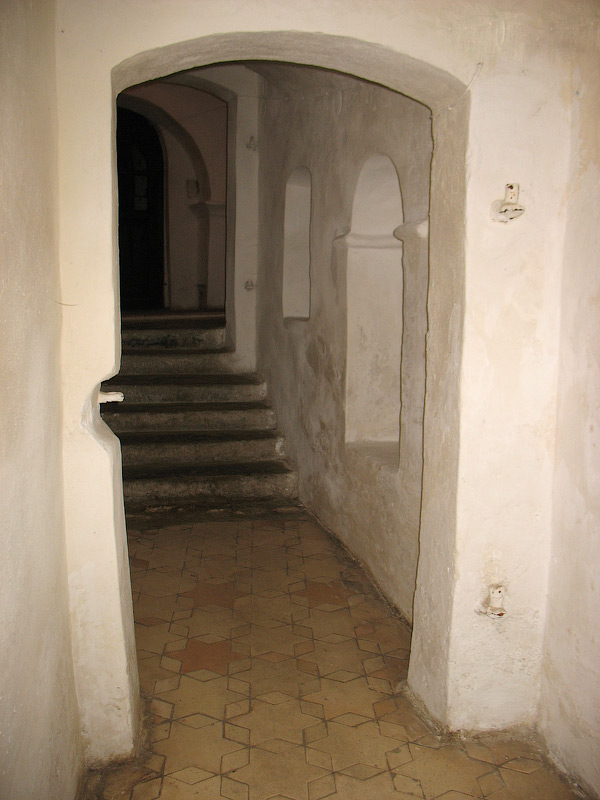

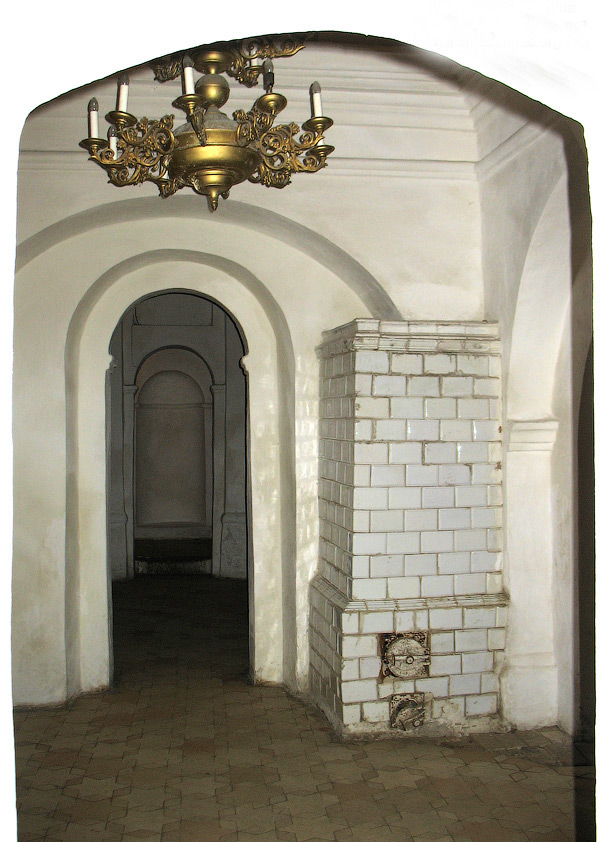

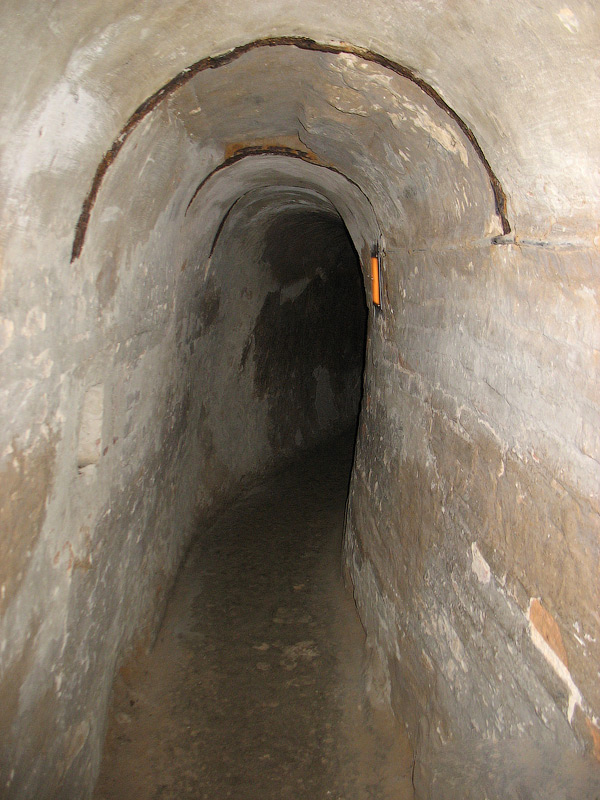
