= Church of St. Theodosius, Chernihiv =

Church in Chernihiv Oblast, Ukraine

Church of St. Theodosius
- Церква святителя Феодосія
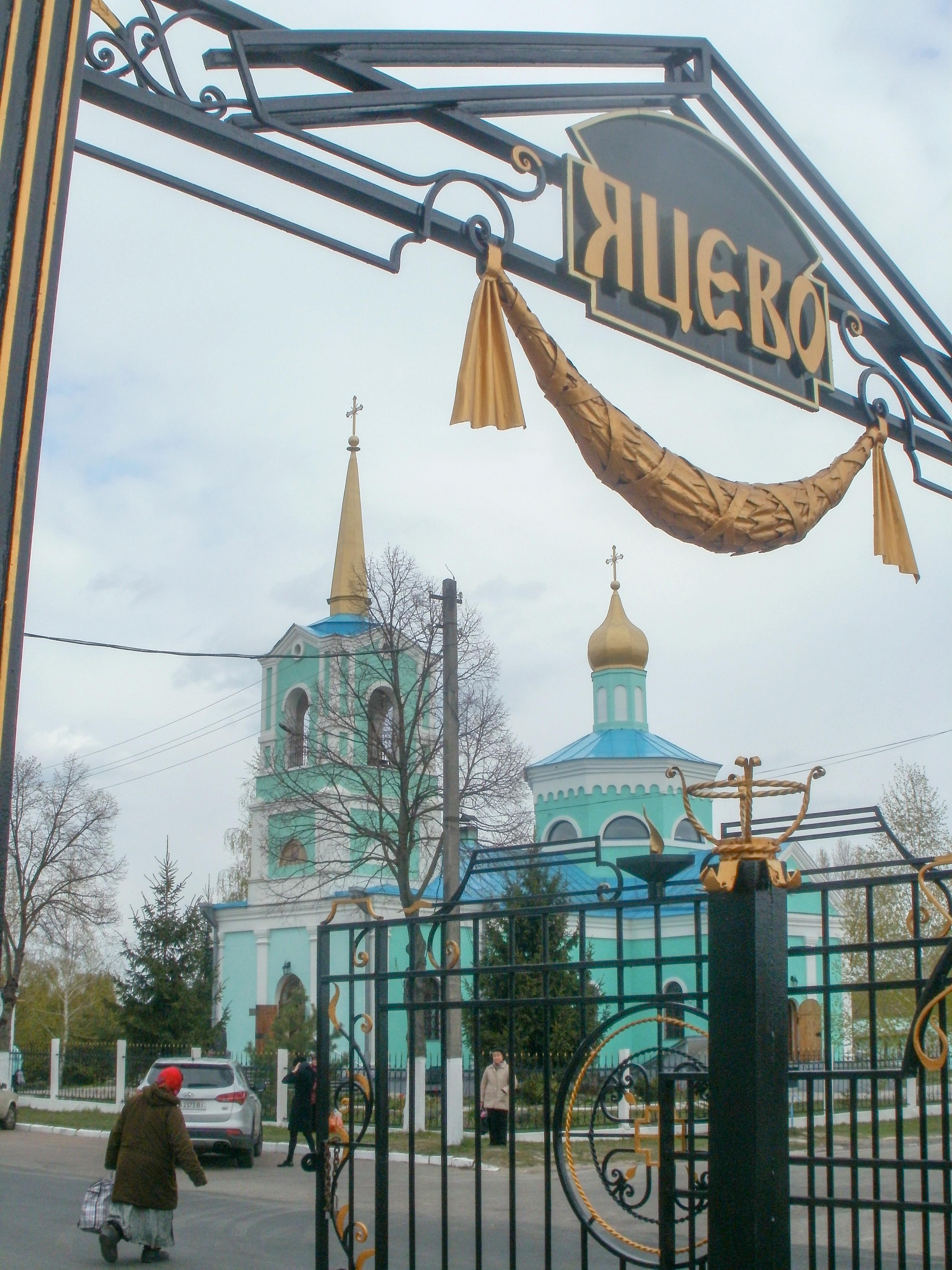
- Church of St. Theodosius in Chernihiv
- Church of St. Theodosius
- 51°29′54″N 31°18′34″E
- Location: Hetmana Polubotka St, 40/2, Yatsevo Cemetery, Chernihiv, Chernihiv Oblast, 14030
- Country: Ukraine
- Denomination: Eastern Orthodox Church
- Website: https://st-theodosius.kiev.ua/

History
- Status: Chapel

Architecture
- Functional status: Active
- Architectural type: Byzantine Revival architecture
- Years built: 26
- Groundbreaking: 1996
- Completed: 2022

Administration
- Archdiocese: Chernihiv
- Diocese: Chernihiv of the OCU

The Church of St. Theodosius (Ukrainian: Церква святителя Феодосія) is a brick church in the city of Chernihiv, at the Yatsevo cemetery. The first church in Chernihiv built after 1991.

== History ==
The Church of St. Theodosius of Uglich became the first new church in Chernihiv. The project was developed free of charge by architects V. Ustinov and R. Lifshyts. The church was consecrated on November 28, 1996.

On March 13, 2022, it was partially destroyed by shelling and subsequent fire during the battles for Chernihiv.

In June 2022, the reconstruction of the church of San Teodosio, destroyed during the bombing, began.

In April 2023, the relics of Saints Theodosius of Uglich, Filaret Gumilev, Rev. Lawrence were returned to the Trinity Cathedral.

== Architecture ==
Architecture The church was built in the modernized forms of classicism of the mid-19th century. The Peter and Paul Cathedral in St. Petersburg is also a kind of prototype of the temple.

In plan, the temple has the form of an elongated cross. Above the western branch of the cross is a bell tower with a high spire.

Above the main volume is an onion-shaped bathhouse. Since the temple is a cemetery, the interiors are restrained in design.

Of the wall paintings, only the images of the evangelists on sails are preserved: on the north-eastern one is painted the evangelist John, on the south-eastern one — the evangelist Matthew, on the north-western one — the evangelist Mark, on the south-western one — Luke.

The main compositional center and the main decoration of the temple interior is the iconostasis. The author of its design as a whole and individual details is the abbot of the temple, Father. Peter. The iconostasis was carved by the carver Valery Ivanovich Sidortsov. The iconostasis has 2 tiers. In the center are the royal gates, which depict the 4 evangelists, as well as the composition "Annunciation". To the left of the royal gates on the first tier are the icons: "Theotokos with the Child", "Archangel Michael" and "Yuri the Serpent-Slayer", and to the right - "Jesus Christ", "Archangel Gabriel" and "St. Lawrence of Chernihiv". Nearby in a carved niche is a large temple icon of St. Theodosius of Uglich.

On the 2nd tier are the icons: above the royal gates - "The Last Supper", on the left - "The Prophet Moses" and "Ivan Chrysostom", on the right - "Ivan the Forerunner" and "Basil the Great". The icons were painted by two icon painters — Yevgenia and Kamil (baptized Konstantin) Taishev. The iconostasis ends with a cross. The carving and background are covered with dark varnish.

== Gallery ==
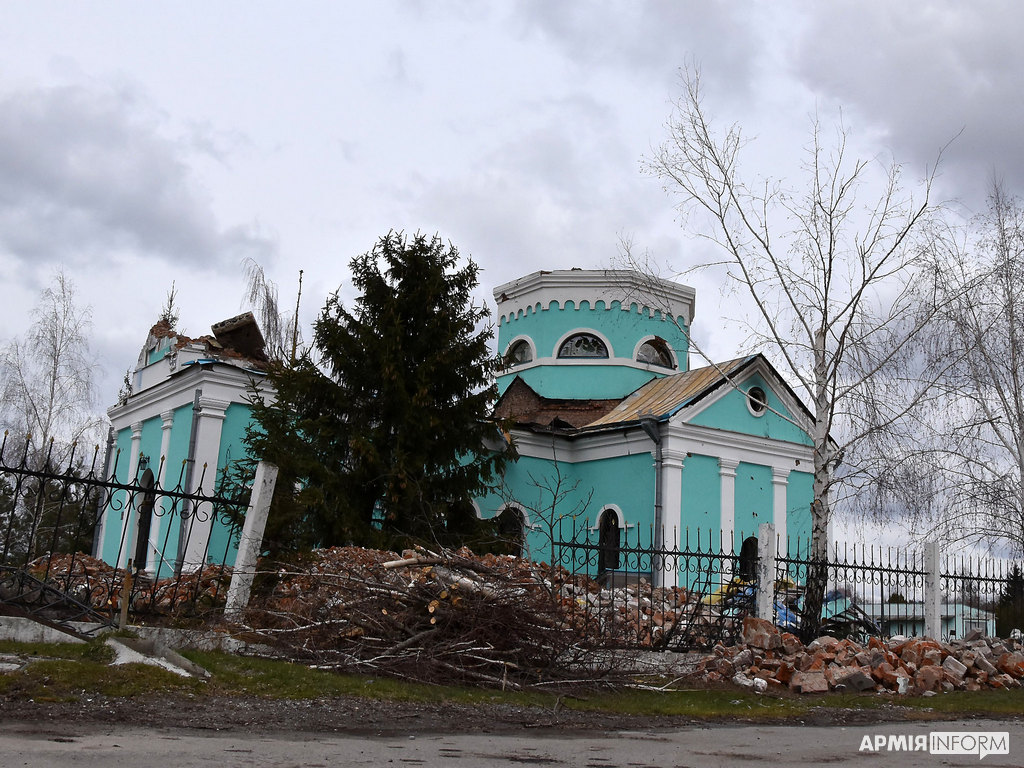

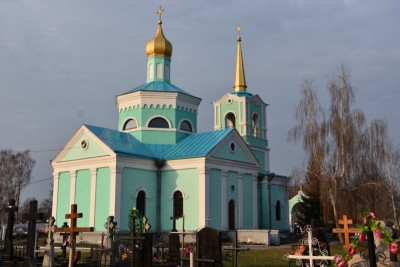

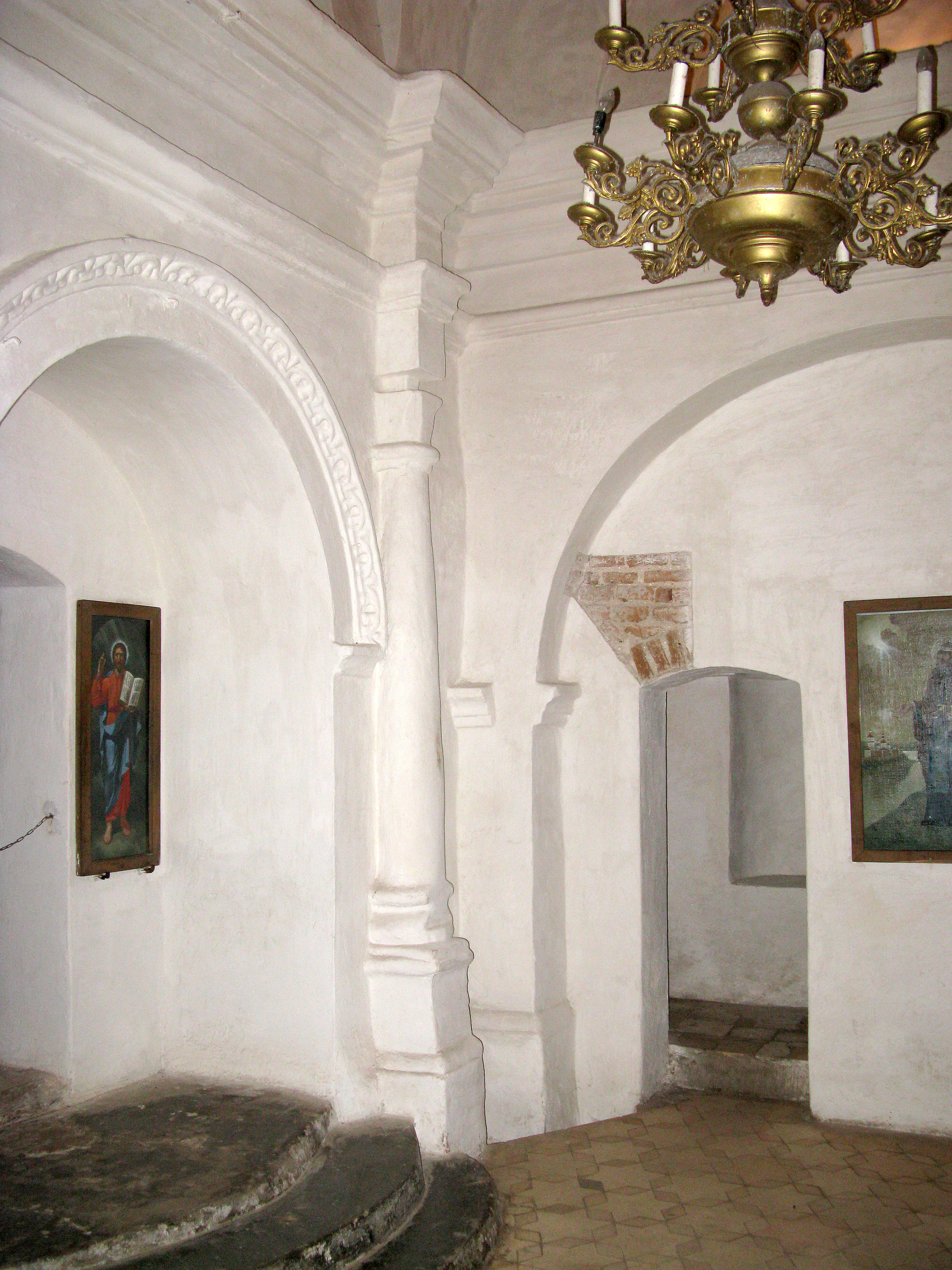

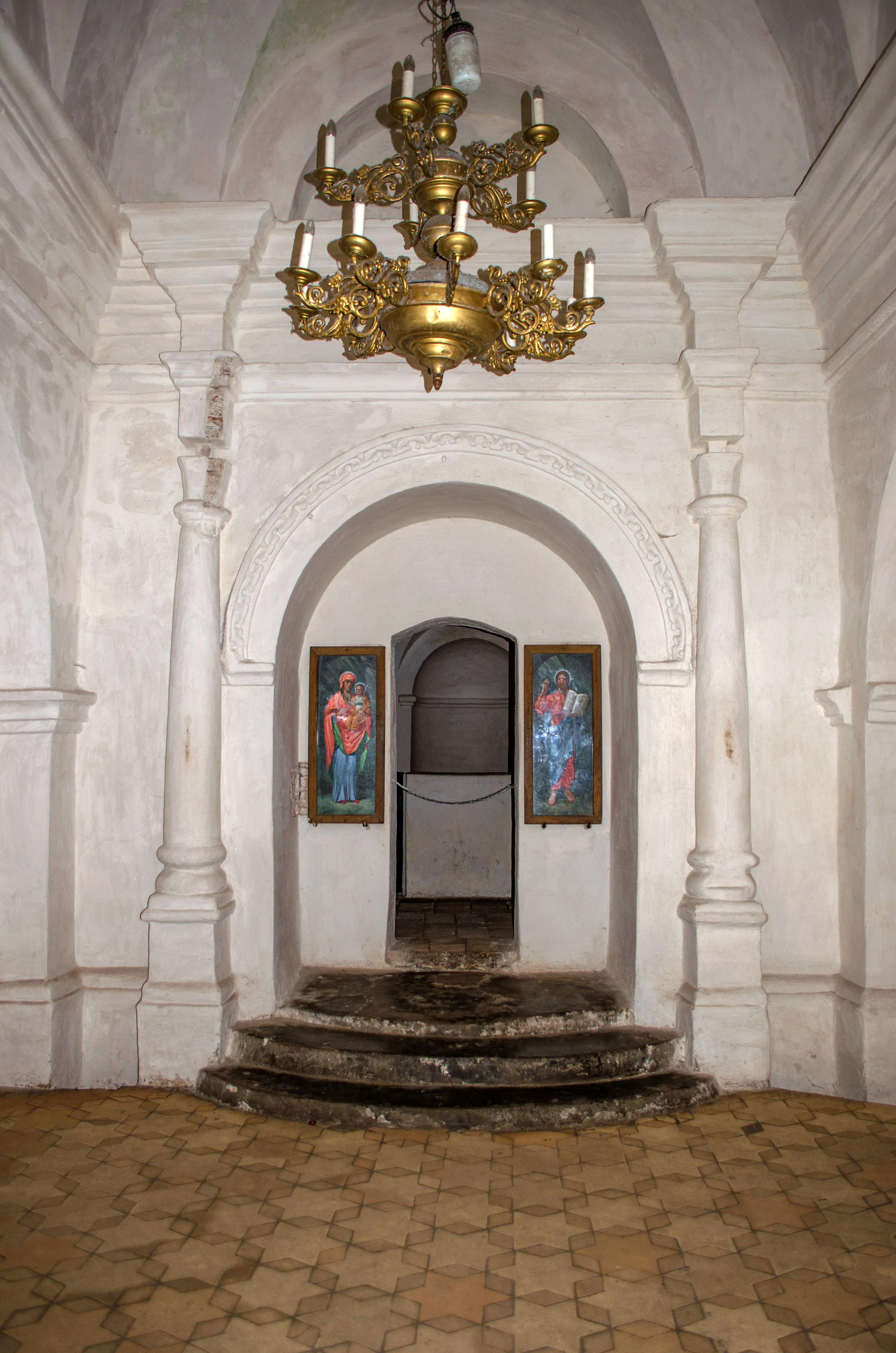

== See also ==
- List of Churches and Monasteries in Chernihiv
