= Church of the Descent of the Holy Spirit, Chernihiv =

Church in Chernihiv Oblast, Ukraine

Church of the Holy Spirit
- Храм усіх святих Чернігівських
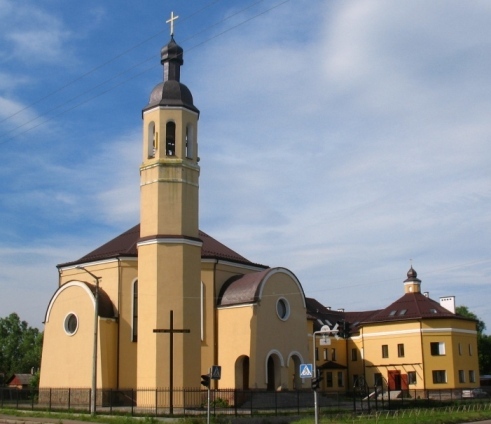
- Church of the Holy Spirit in Chernihiv
- Church of the Holy Spirit
- 51°30′46″N 31°19′36″E
- Location: Kyivska Street, 20, Chernihiv, Chernihiv Oblast, Ukraine, 14030
- Country: Ukraine
- Denomination: Catholic Church
- Website: https://parafia.at.ua/

History
- Status: Chapel

Architecture
- Functional status: Active; Museum
- Architectural type: Church
- Years built: 2002

Administration
- Province: Chernihiv Oblast
- Diocese: Chernihiv

Clergy
- Priest: Pyotr Wroblewski

The Church of the Descent of the Holy Spirit (Ukrainian: Храм усіх святих Чернігівських) is a Catholic Church church located in Chernihiv.

== Description ==
The current Roman Catholic church in Chernihiv, belongs to the Roman Catholic Diocese of Kyiv-Zhytomyr. The church is served by priests from the Congregation of the Missionary Oblates of Mary Immaculate.

== History ==
At the end of the 7th century. A fortified settlement arose here, which became the center of the Northern tribe. From the 9th century. The settlement became part of Kievan Rus', and Chernigov was first mentioned in the chronicles in 907. In the 11th-13th centuries it was the center of the Seversk region and the Chernigov principality. In 1353. Chernigov became part of the Grand Duchy of Lithuania and Rus', and in 1503 - of the Grand Duchy of Moscow. In 1618. transferred from Muscovy to the Polish-Lithuanian Commonwealth. In 1623. The city received Magdeburg rights and from 1635 became the center of the Chernigov voivodeship. From the middle of the 17th century. Chernigov became part of the Hetman-Cossack state and became the headquarters of the Chernigov regiment. After the liquidation of the Hetmanate in 1782. it was the center of the Chernihiv Governorate since 1797. - Little Russian Province, since 1808. - Chernihiv Province. In 1925-1932. Chernihiv was the center of the Chernihiv District and since 1932. it is a regional center.

In 1992-1993 the authorities registered a Roman Catholic community in Chernihiv, which for a decade had unsuccessfully sought the restitution of the old shrine of the Assumption of the Blessed Virgin Mary and St. Nicholas. Church of St. John the Baptist, built in the first half of the 19th century.

In 2002, after a long (and unsuccessful) dispute between the city authorities and the Roman Catholic parish over the premises of the church built in the 19th century on the corner of Pyatnytska and Chernyshevsky streets, construction of a new church and monastery building began. And although there are difficulties, construction is progressing in a progressive direction. Now, on the corner of Kyivska and Honcha streets, a small complex has been erected, consisting of a church, a bell tower, and a house for priests. Several priests work permanently in the parish, nuns serve, who take care of the youngest children in the shelter, and priests from other parishes come for retreats. Since its restoration, the parish has been headed by Father Henryk (Kaminsky). Parishioners go on pilgrimage trips to shrines in Ukraine and Europe - to Poland, France, Austria, and Germany. In 1995, A significant event for the people of Chernihiv took place - representatives of the parish, led by the abbot, visited Rome to meet with Pope John Paul II.

Before the large-scale invasion of Russian troops, the Roman Catholic Church of the Descent of the Holy Spirit in Chernihiv had about 120 permanent parishioners and about 200 people registered as members of the community. Currently, about 50-70 believers attend Sunday services. Some of them have Polish roots. The abbot, Father Piotr Wroblewski, is also Polish and he has lived and served in Ukraine for 12 years, peaks Ukrainian with almost no accent. And during the Siege of Chernihiv by the Russians, he remained here, next to the people of Chernihiv.

== Liturgies ==
Order of liturgies:

Day of the week	Language	Time
Monday	Ukrainian	18:00
Tuesday	Ukrainian	09:00
Wednesday	Ukrainian	18:00
Thursday	Polish	09:00
Friday	Ukrainian	18:00
Saturday	Ukrainian	09:00
Saturday	Adoration of the Blessed Sacrament	18:00
	Sunday service	19:00
Sunday	Polish	09:00
Sunday	Ukrainian	11:00
Sunday	Sunday prayer service	18:00

== See also ==
- List of Churches and Monasteries in Chernihiv
