= Vvedenska Church, Chernihiv =

Church in Chernihiv Oblast, Ukraine

Vvedenska Church
- Church of the Presentation of the Virgin Mary
- Введенська трапезна церква
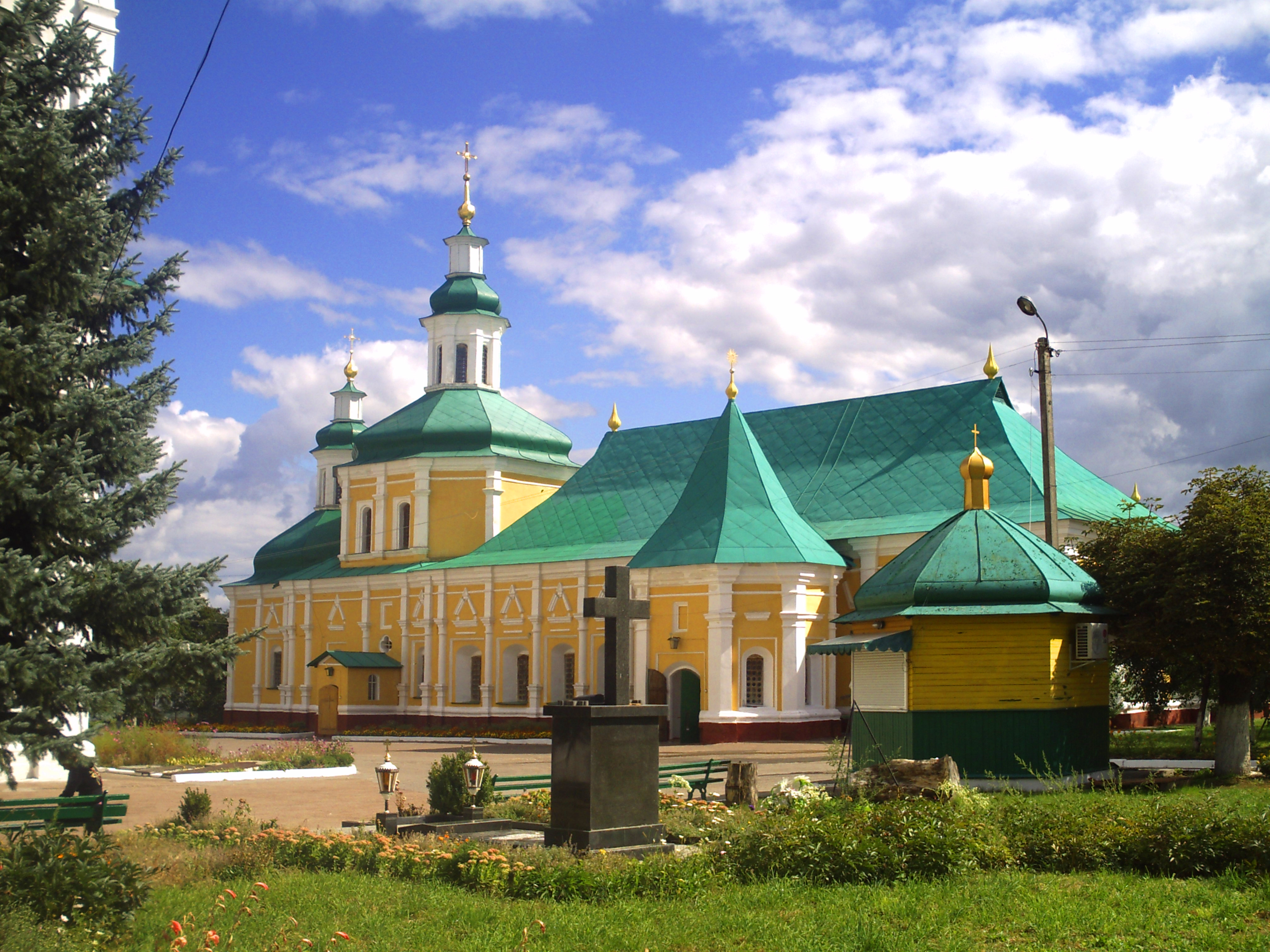
- Vvedenska Church in Chernihiv
- Vvedenska Church
- 51°28′37.2″N 31°16′50.59″E
- Location: Trinity Monastery Chernihiv, Chernihiv Oblast, Ukraine, 14030
- Country: Ukraine
- Denomination: Eastern Orthodox Church

History
- Status: Chapel

Architecture
- Functional status: Active
- Architectural type: Church
- Style: Ukrainian Baroque
- Years built: 12
- Groundbreaking: 1679

Specifications
- Length: 37.5 m
- Width: 10 m

Administration
- Diocese: Chernihiv

Immovable Monument of National Significance of Ukraine
- Official name: Введенська церква (Church of the Presentation of the Virgin Mary)
- Type: Architecture
- Reference no.: 250044/3-Н

The Vvedenska Church, or Church of the Presentation of the Virgin Mary (Ukrainian: Введенська трапезна церква, romanized: Vvedenska trapezna tserkva), is an Eastern Orthodox Church refectory church that is part of the Trinity Monastery in Chernihiv, Ukraine. Built in 1677–1679, before the construction of the main building of this ensemble – the Trinity Cathedral. The only two-nave church preserved in left-bank Ukraine.

== Description ==
The column-free refectory is a true masterpiece of the national architectural style. The structure of the refectory is one of the oldest in the group of monuments of the 17th century. The influence of this structure on a number of other monuments is undoubted. Its planning structure is repeated in the refectory of the Michael Monastery in Kyiv. In other cases, there are minor differences, for example, in the refectory of the Vydubychi Monastery. But the general scheme is preserved here: the church building is adjoined from the west by a dining hall, and auxiliary rooms for cooking and storing food are adjacent to it.

The same scheme is used in the column-free refectories of the Hamaliivka, Hustynia and other monastery ensembles. The church, dining hall, and hall are located in one line, due to which the one-story building is elongated, and in plan it is a rectangle with protrusions – raskrepovka, 37.5 m long, 10 m wide in the narrow part, and 17.5 m wide in the wide part.

A feature of the composition is that the church has 2 baths, not one, as in most cases. Here, the domed four-bay with the help of a flat sail turns into an eight-bay, which, tapering conically, turns into a lantern topped with a gable. In the construction of the interior space, techniques derived from wooden architecture were used. One bath is intended to accommodate the altar, the second for those who pray. Such architecture is all the more interesting because a dispute arose in the literature – whether the type of two-bay temple existed at all in Ukrainian architecture.

A unique example of interior construction in 17th-century buildings is the refectory hall covered with a cylindrical vault. The expressiveness of the vaulted ceiling is emphasized by lancet-shaped formwork with profiled ribs. The modern baths of the church have a depressed shape that does not correspond to the shape of the interior space. Perhaps they were rebuilt after the monastery fire in 1731. Baths of this form in the first half of the 18th century are known in a number of other monuments, for example, in the Church of All Saints of the Kyiv Pechersk Lavra.

The character of the plastic decoration of the facades of the refectory undoubtedly has some similarities with the plastic of the Lyzohub house. But the fundamental difference is that the refectory has a clearly defined main facade, which is not present in the Lyzohub house. The energetic vertical rhythm of the main facade, deep window openings in the thickness of the walls, characteristic triangular pediments above the windows – all this gives the impression of great harmony. The main facade is highlighted by a distinct rhythm of half-columns, and the church already has a different step of half-columns. The architecture of the halls and utility rooms is modest in nature, flat pilasters do not protrude much beyond the field of the wall.

Thus, each part of this building – the church, the refectory hall and utility rooms – is designed differently, but at the same time the integrity and unity of the building are preserved.

== Gallery ==
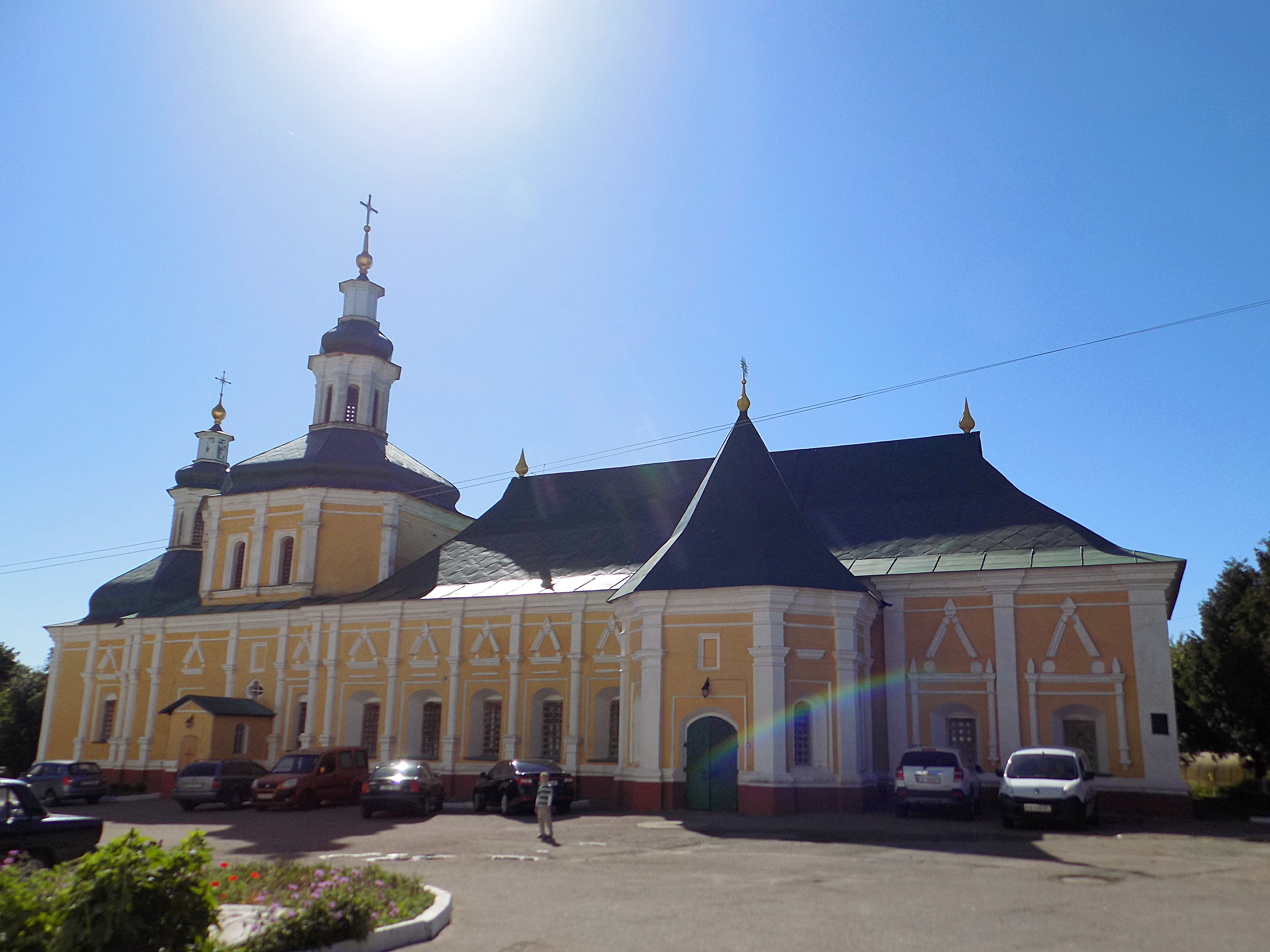

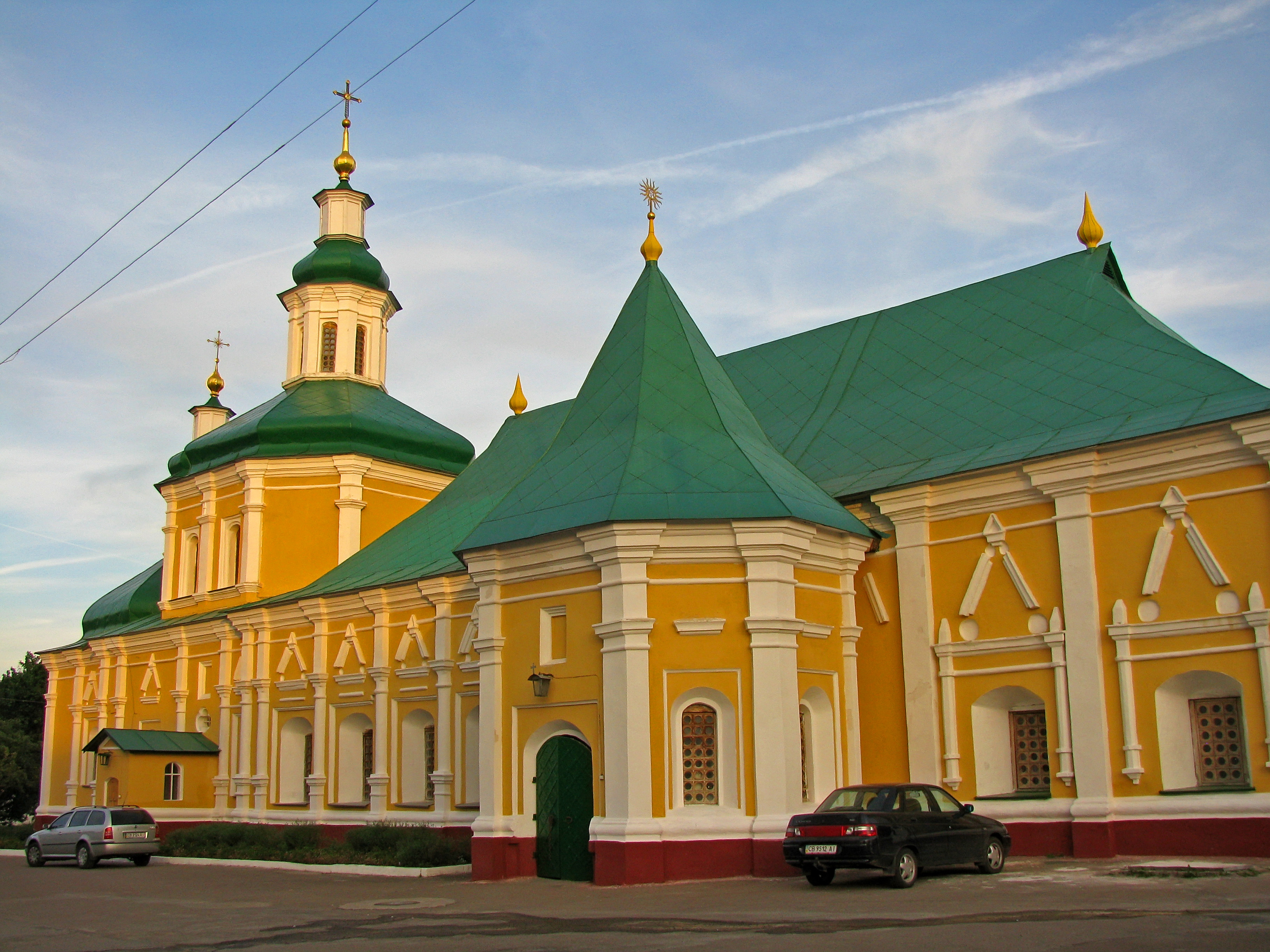

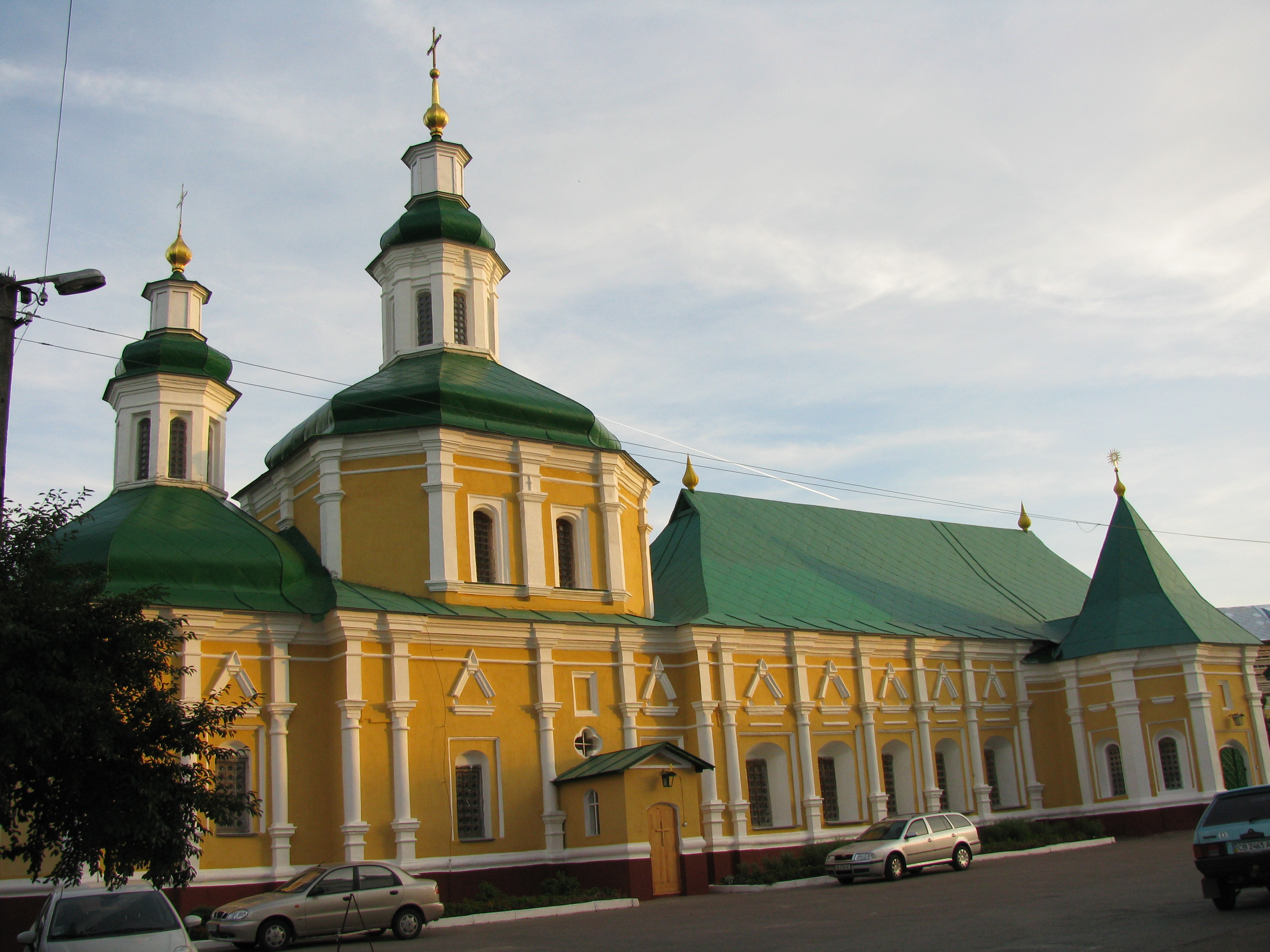

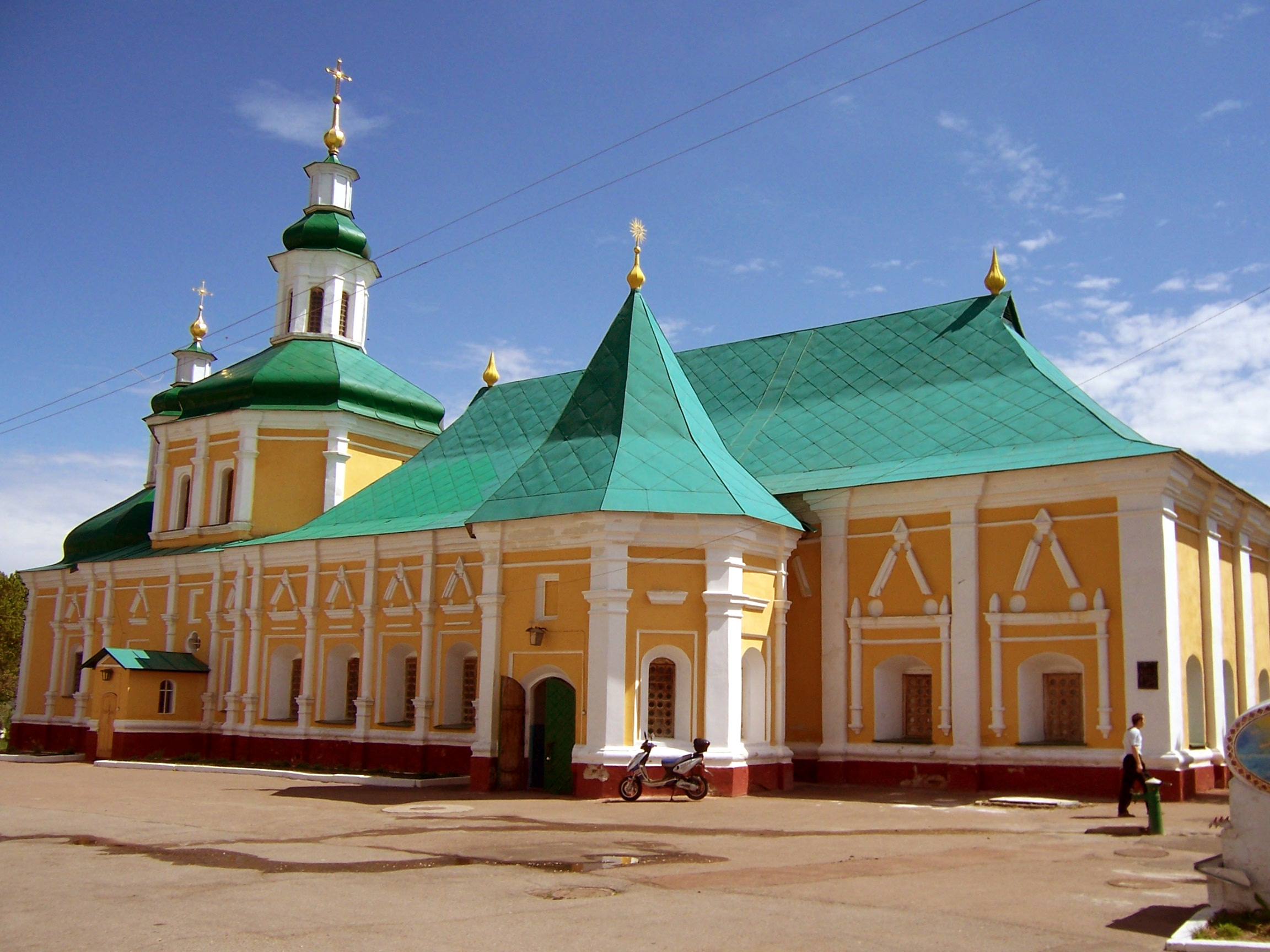

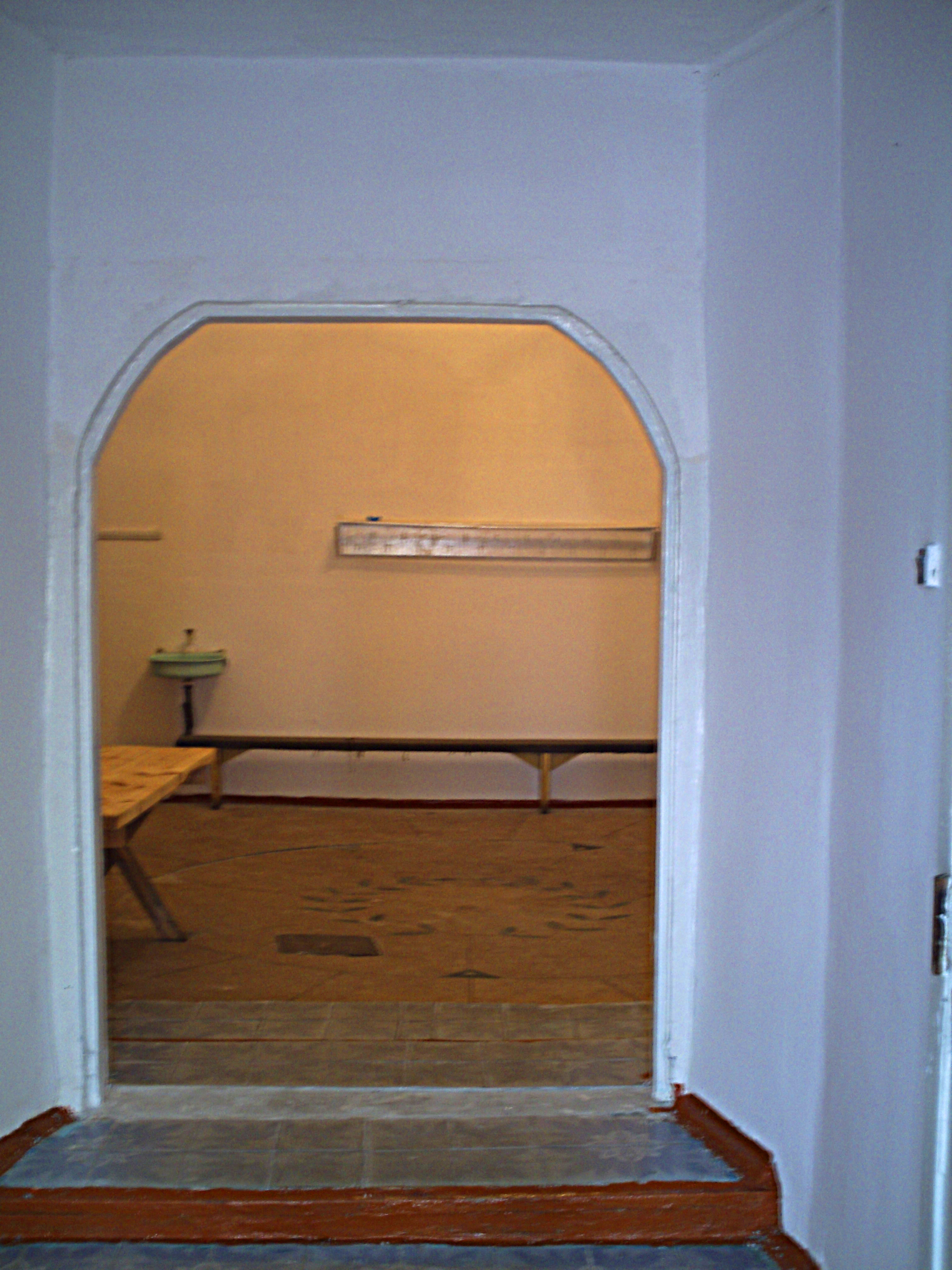

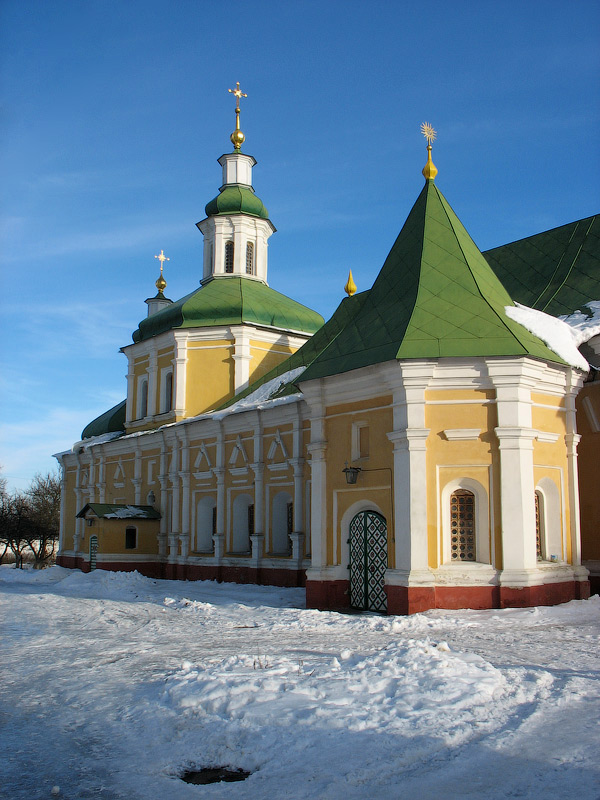

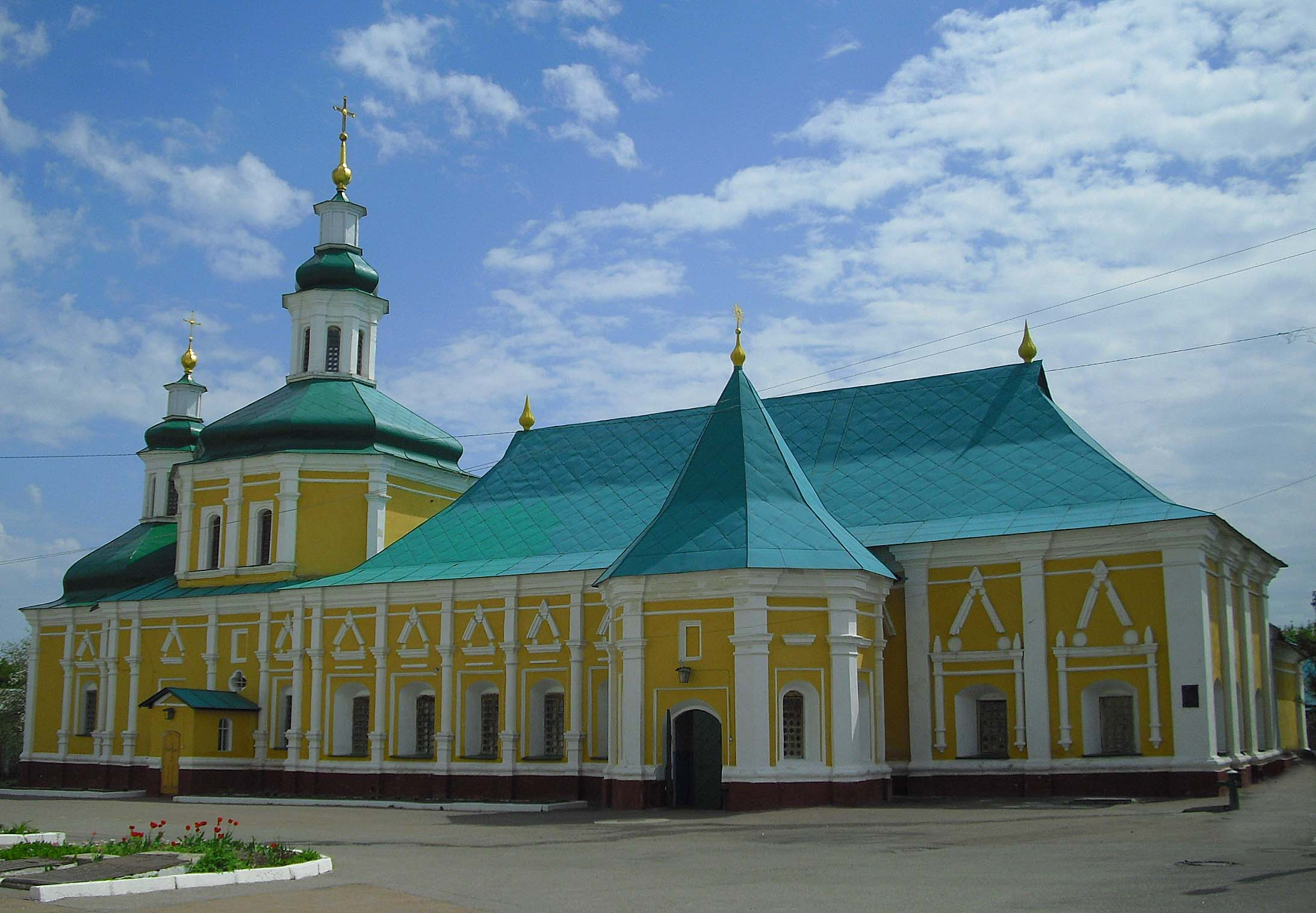

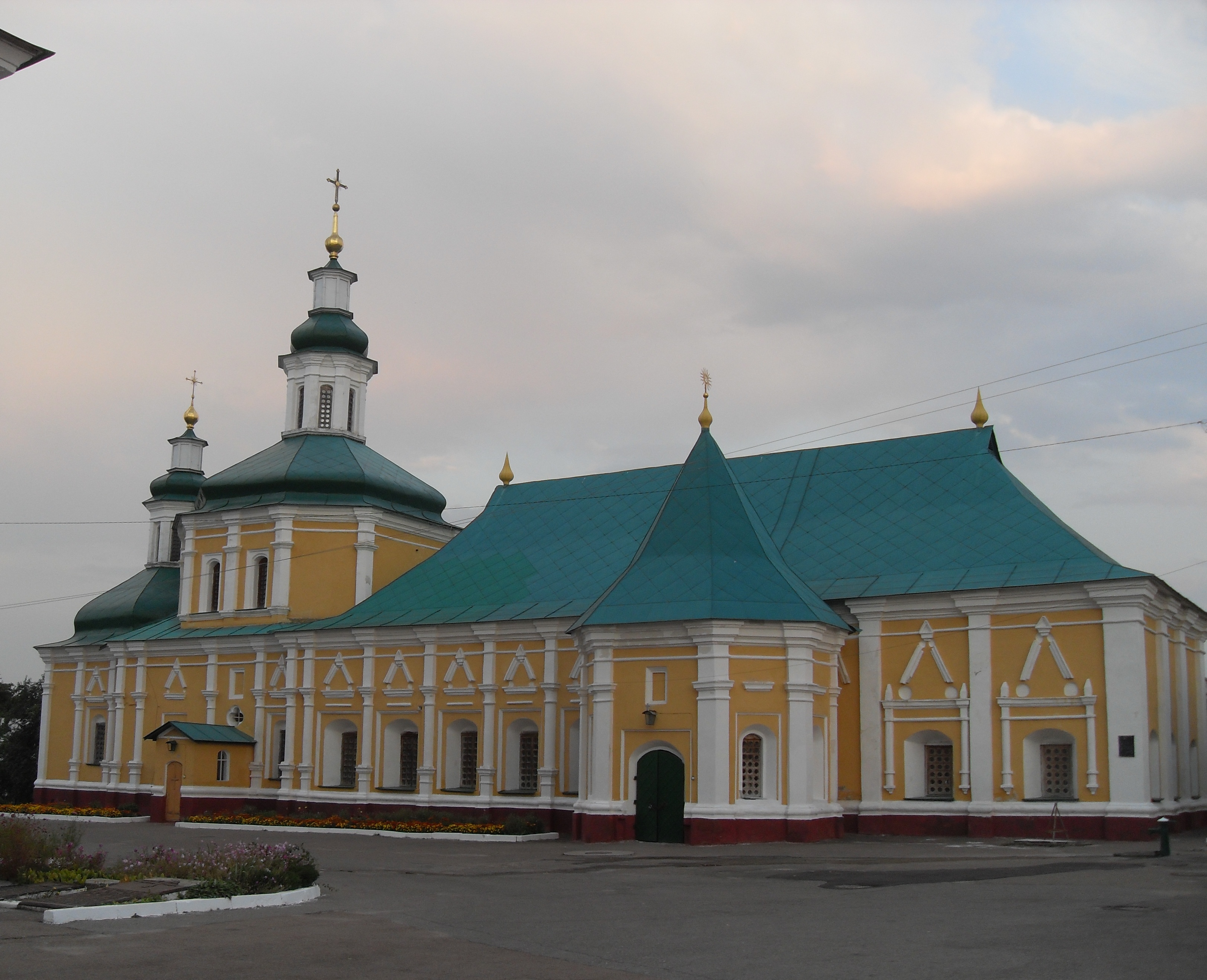

== See also ==
- List of churches and monasteries in Chernihiv
