= Church of Our Lady of Kazan, Chernihiv =

Church in Chernihiv Oblast, Ukraine

Church of St. Kazan
- Свято-Казанська церква
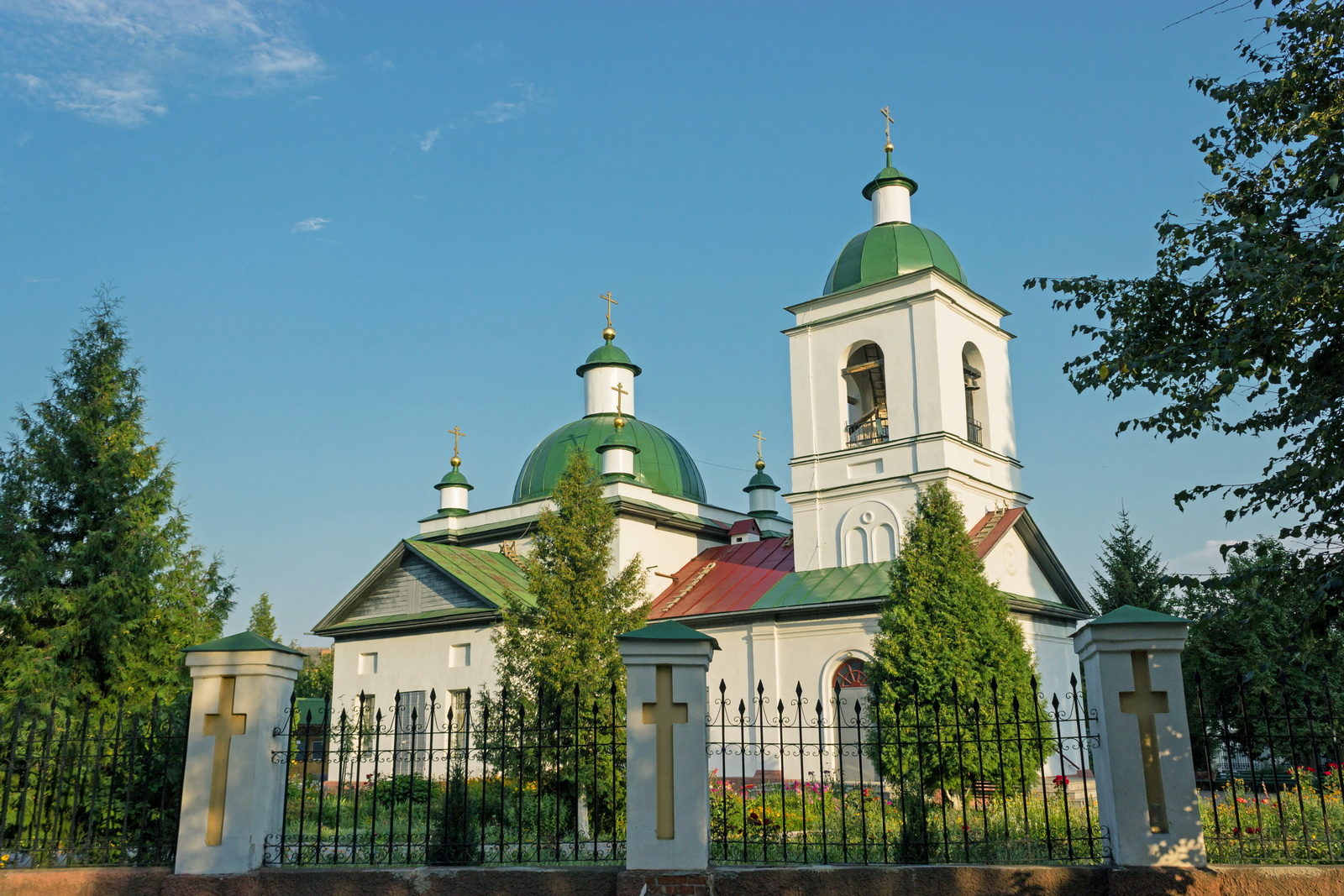
- Church of St. Kazan in Chernihiv
- Church of St. Kazan
- 51°29′15″N 31°17′17″E
- Location: Kotsiubynskoho Street 5, Chernihiv, Chernihiv Oblast, Ukraine, 14030
- Country: Ukraine
- Denomination: Eastern Orthodox Church

History
- Status: Chapel

Architecture
- Functional status: Active; Museum
- Architectural type: Church
- Years built: 1820
- Groundbreaking: 1827

Administration
- Diocese: Chernihiv

The Church of Our Lady of Kazan (Ukrainian: Казанська церква) is an Eastern Orthodox Church church in Chernihiv.

== Description ==
Located in Kholodni Yary on Kotsiubynsky Street 5, next to the museum-reserve of Mykhailo Kotsiubynsky. The central cubic volume is adjoined on four sides by small rooms, and on the west by a square-planned bell tower. The church is built in brick church with a cruciform plan. The central cubic volume is flanked on four sides by small rooms and, to the west, by a square-plan bell tower. It is currently an operational Orthodox church. The architecture of the temple is distinguished by its sobriety and conciseness, the successful proportional relationship between the individual elements and the holistic image of the building. The central bath of the temple has a slender silhouette and its plastered facades are emphasized by elegant wooden frames.

== History ==
The Church of the Kazan Icon of the Mother of God in Chernihiv was built in 1820-27 in honor of the victory in the Franco-Russian War of 1812. It was rebuilt in the middle of the 19th century.

In the mid-19th century the church was rebuilt. After the Bolsheviks came to power, the church was closed. After 1943, the premises of the church were used as a cinema, and later the Kazan Church housed the Ukrgolovtorgtekhnika repair and assembly plant of the Ministry of Trade. In the 1990s, the church was returned to the religious community (UOC-MP).

The church was damaged as a result of the shelling of Chernihiv by Russian troops on the evening of March 6, 2022. The fence was partially destroyed and windows were broken.

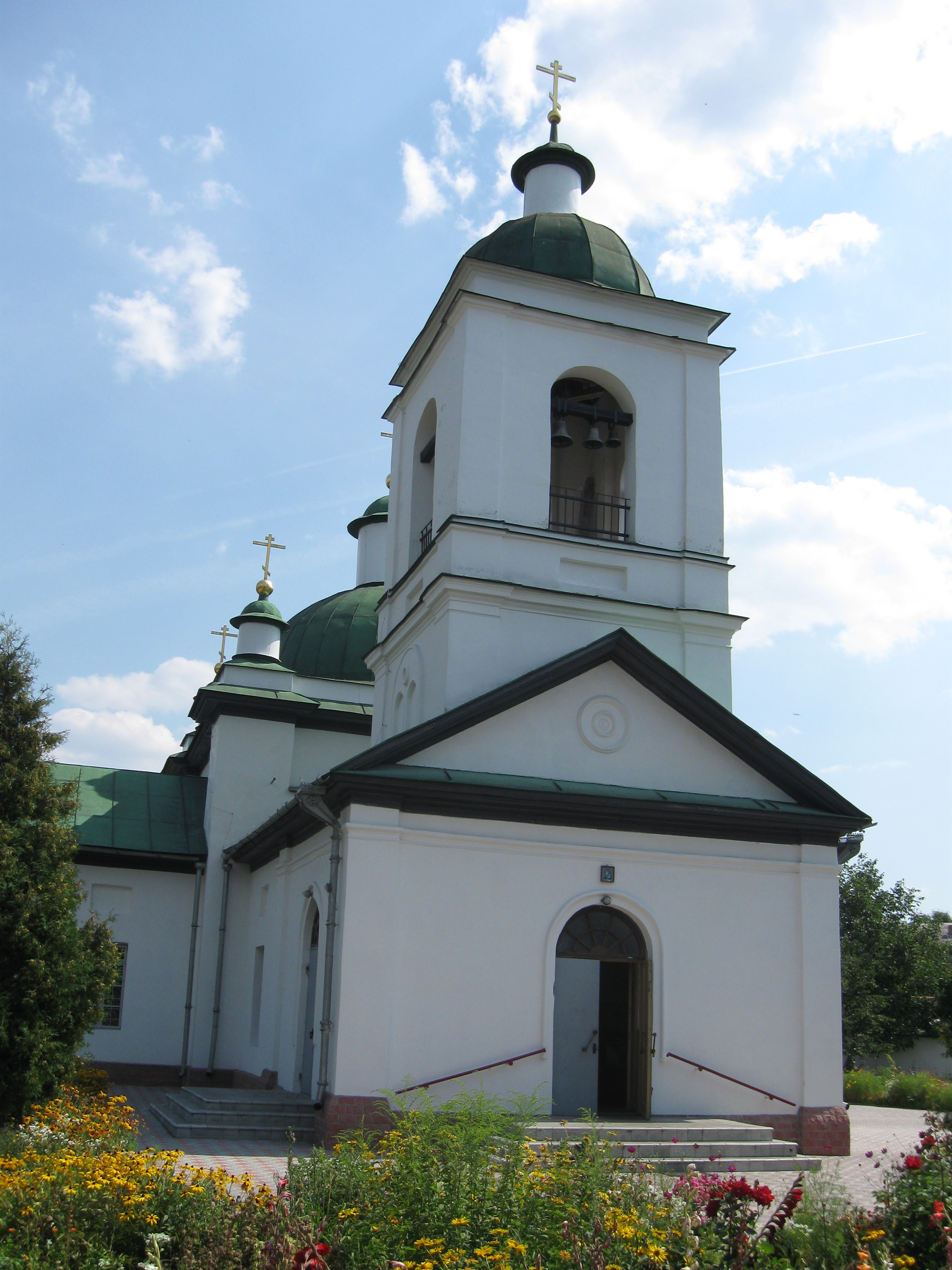

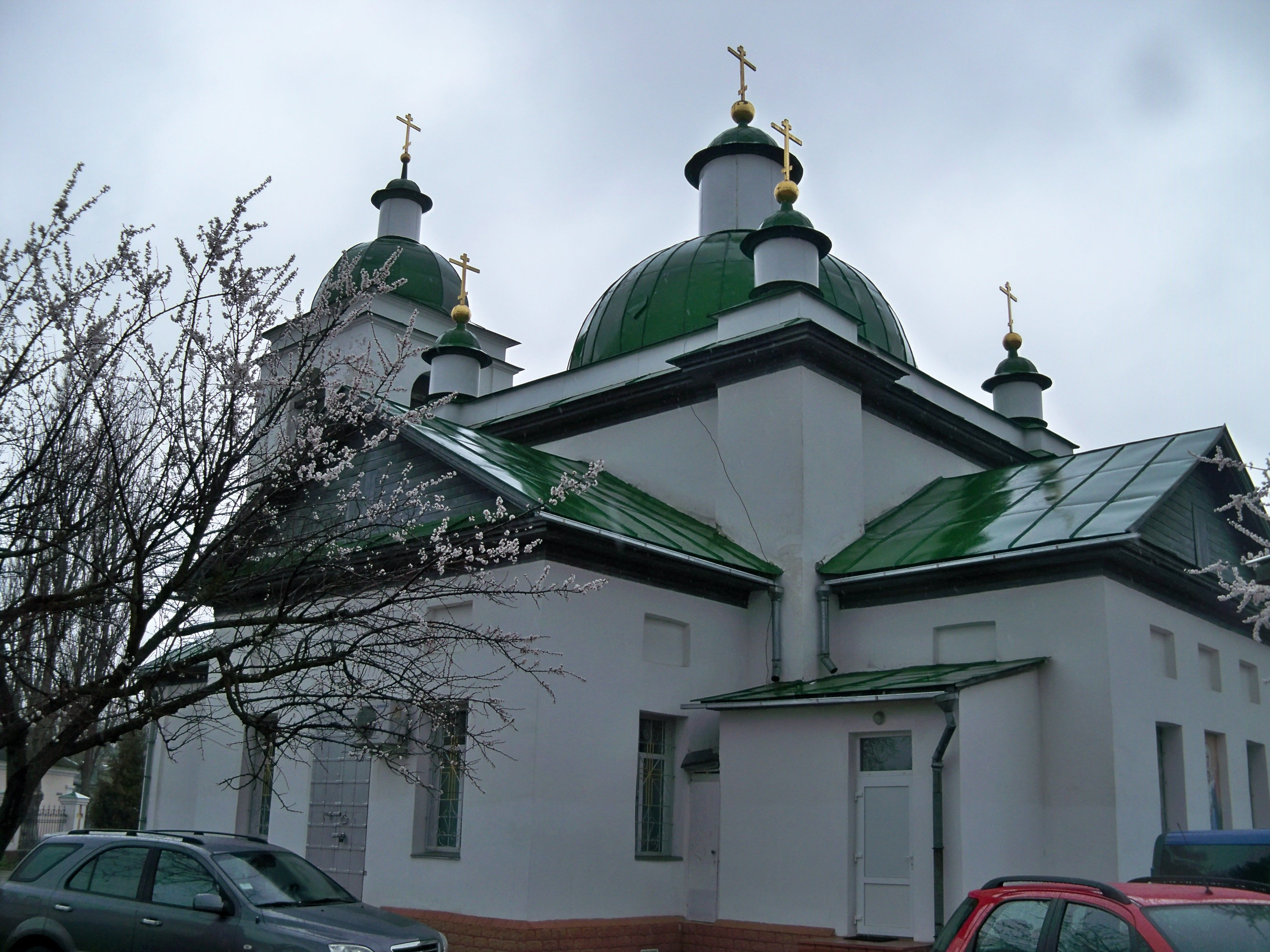

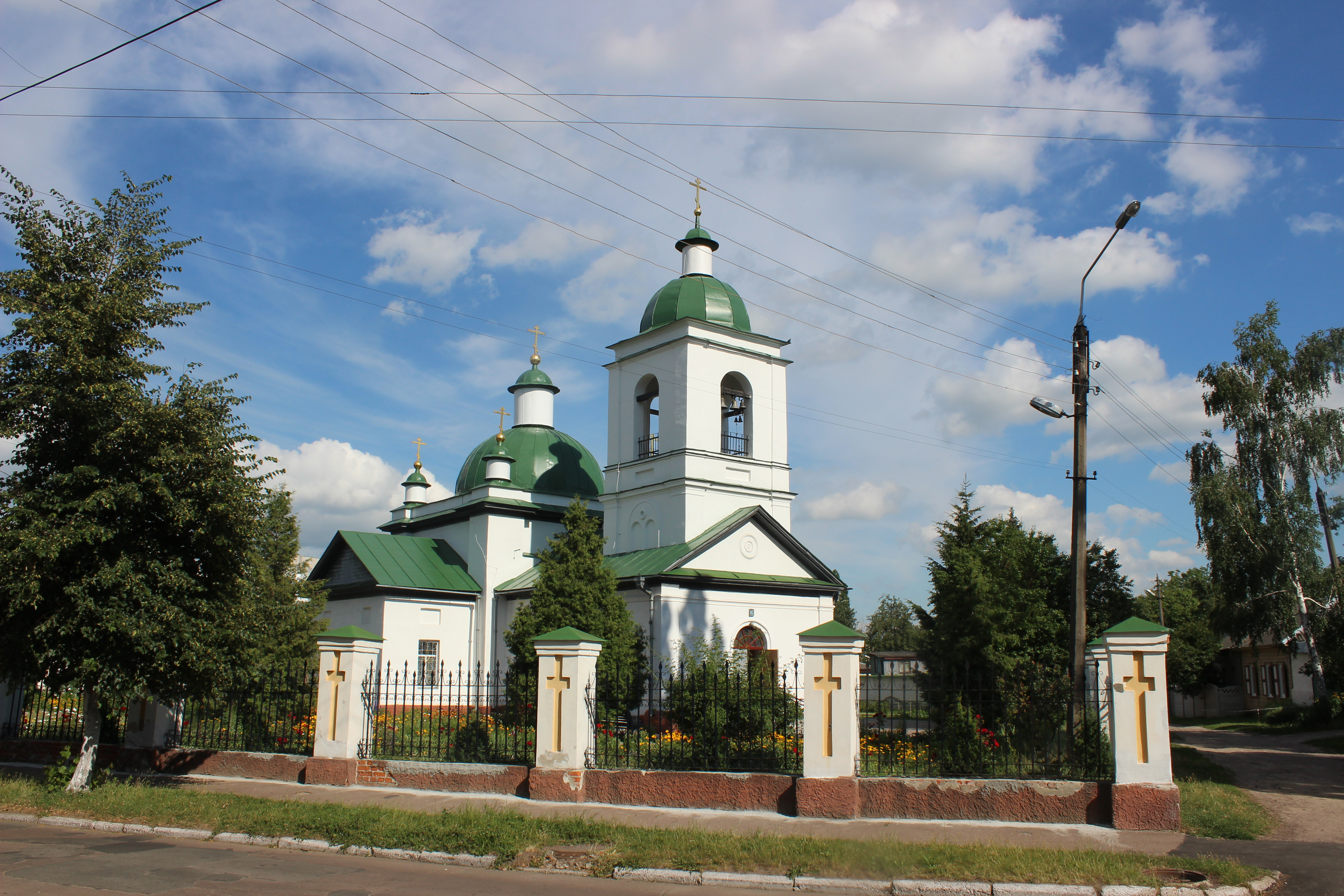

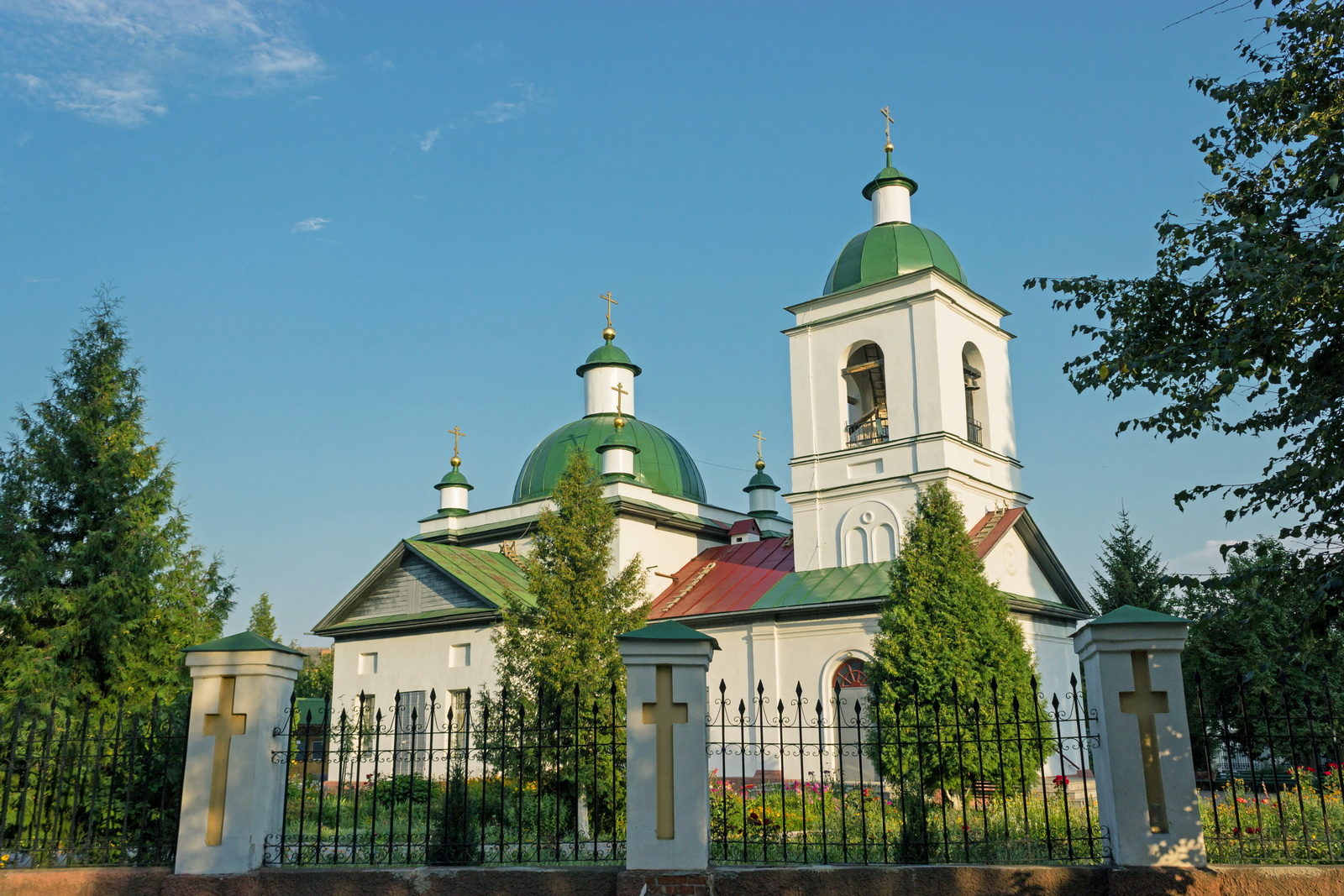

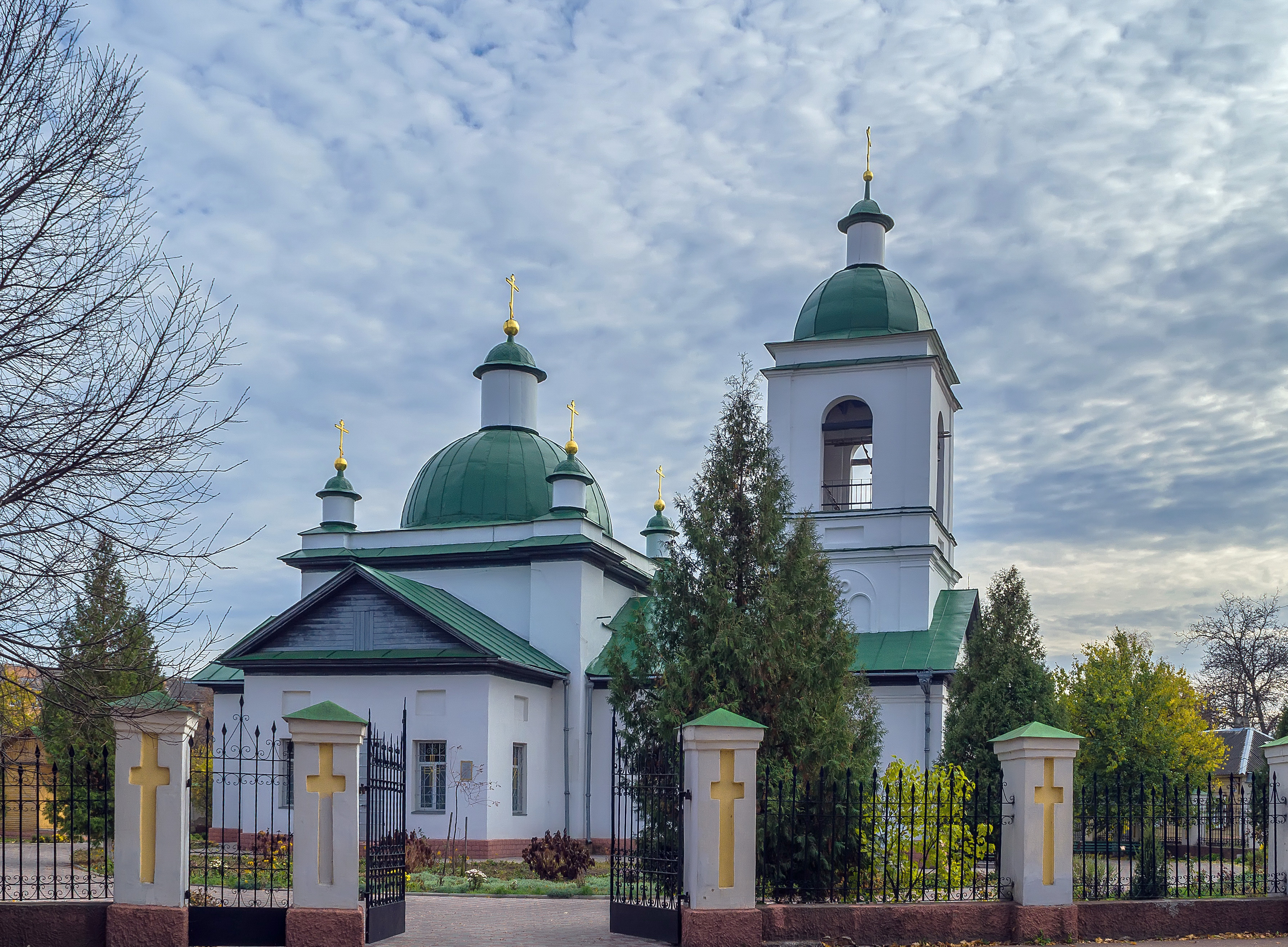

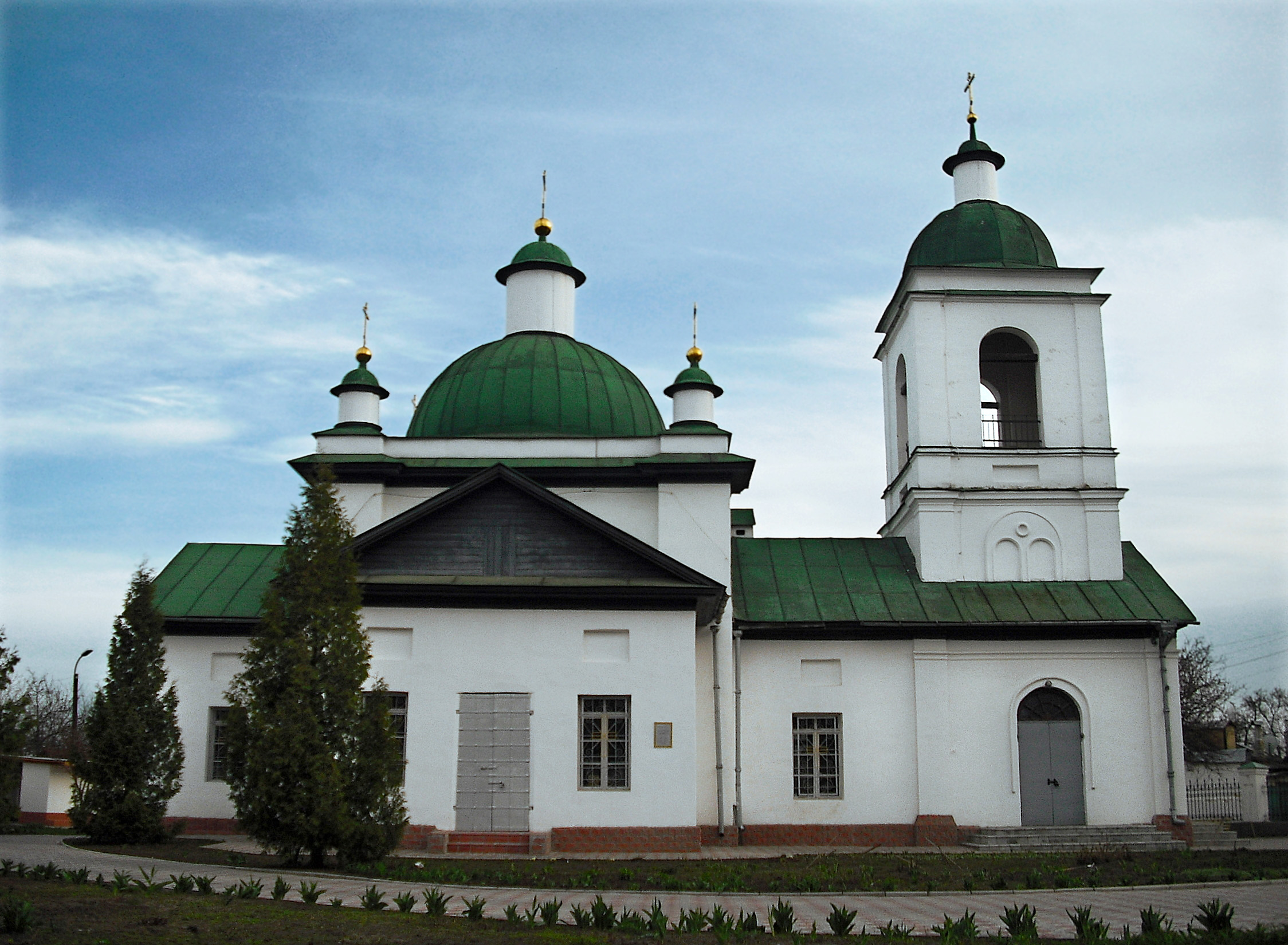

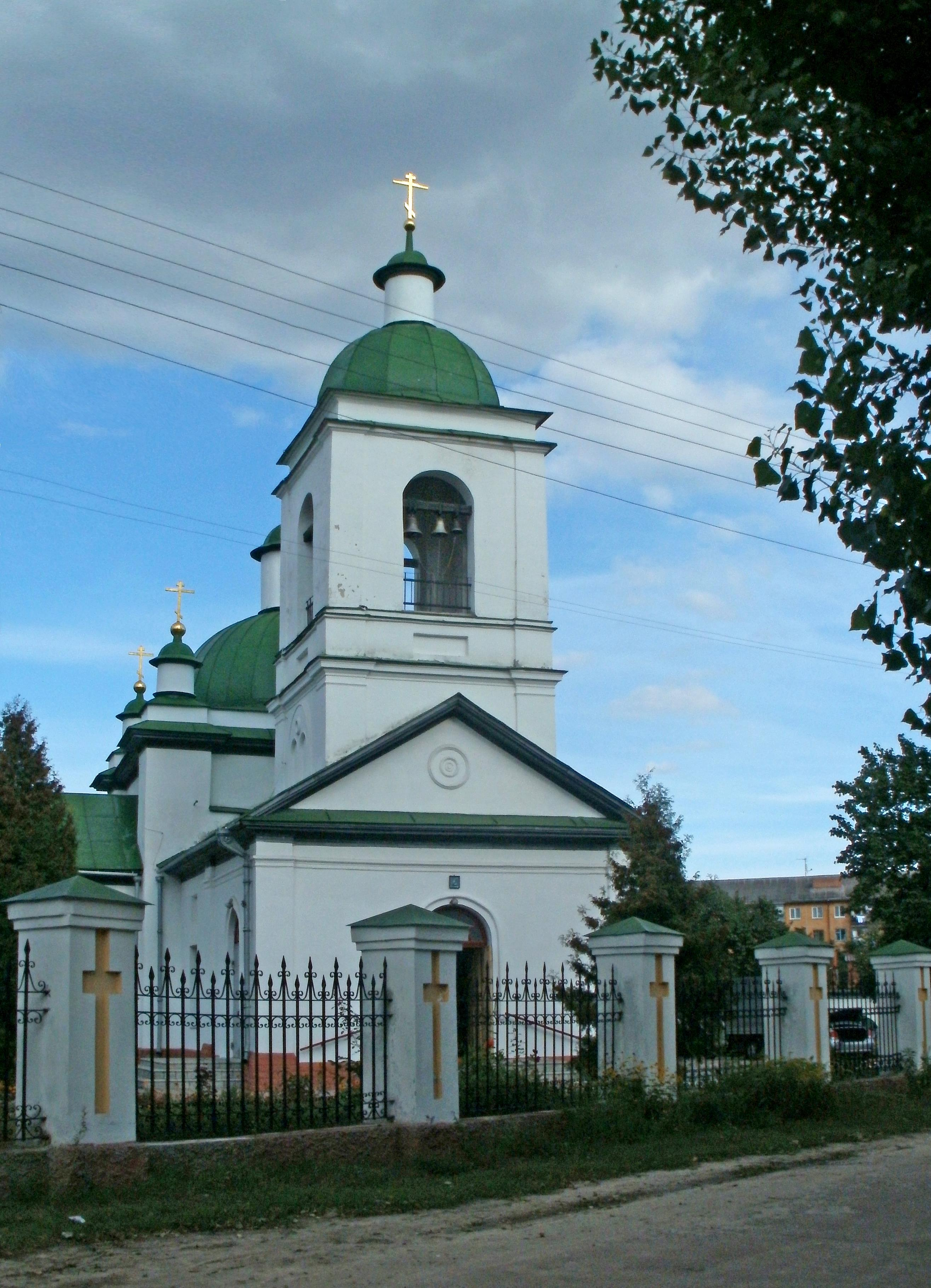

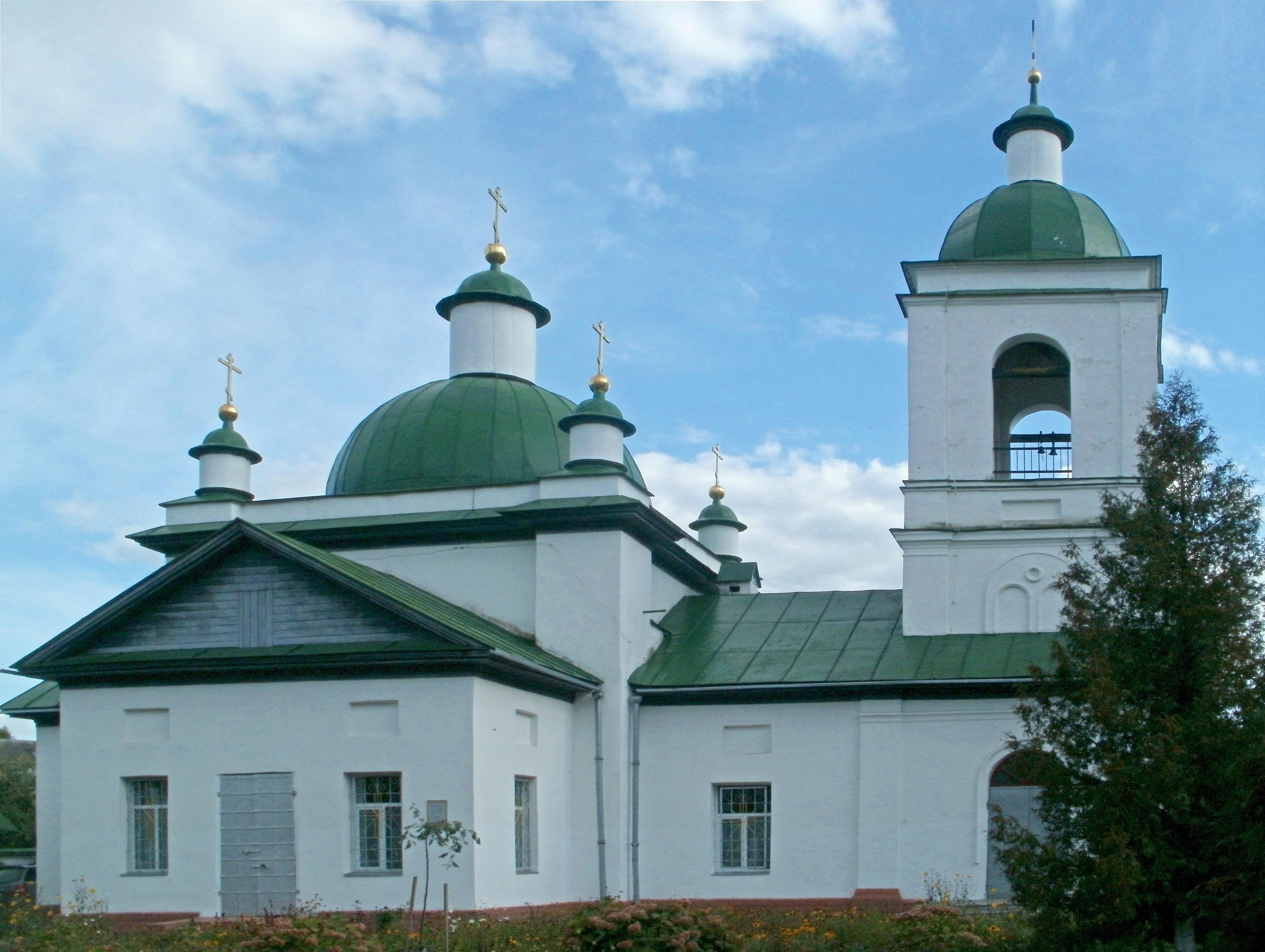

== See also ==
- List of Churches and Monasteries in Chernihiv
