= Church of Saint Michael and Saint Fedor =

Church in Chernihiv Oblast, Ukraine

- Церква Михаїла і Федора
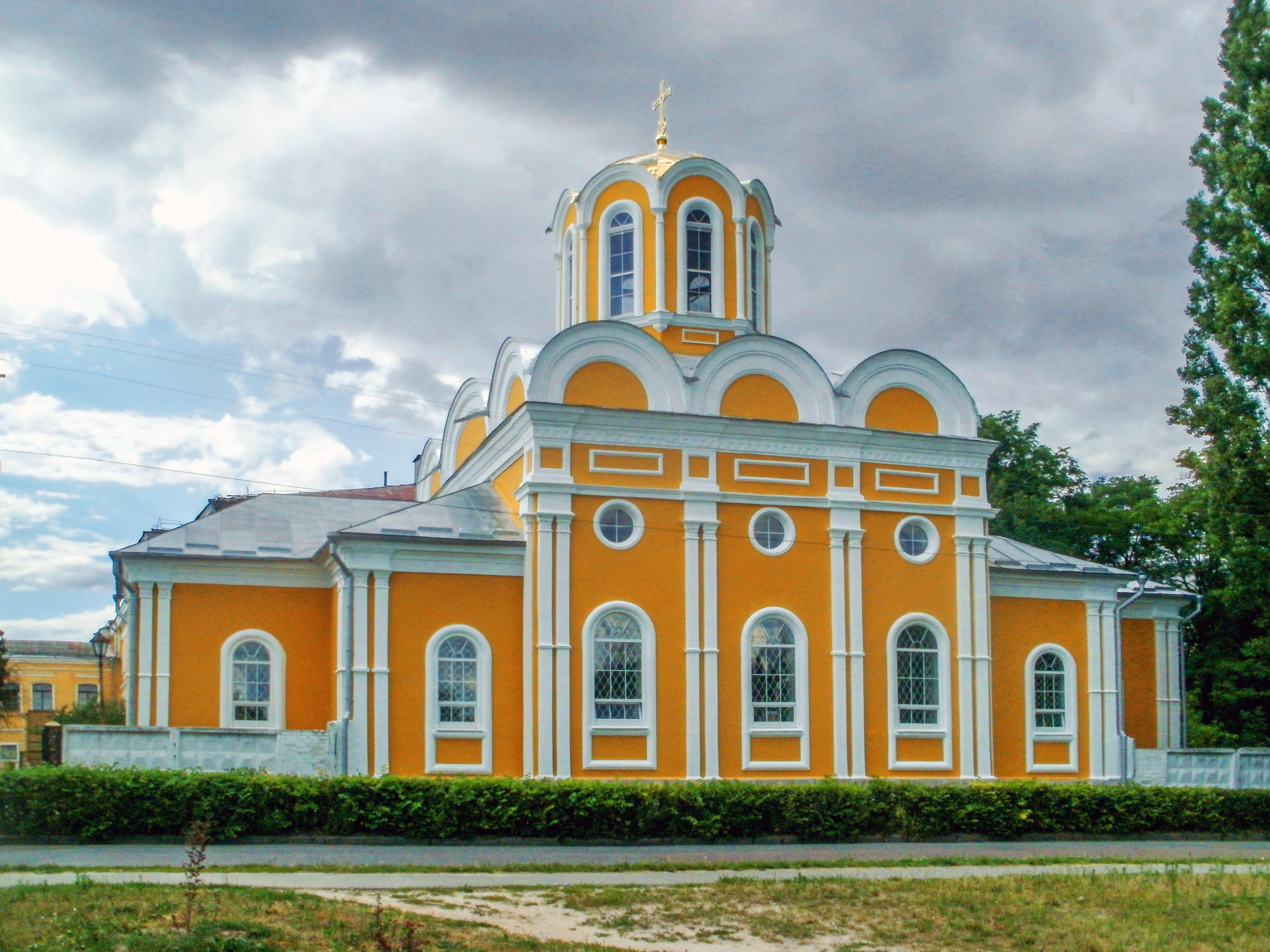
- Church of Saint Michael and Saint Fedor in Chernihiv
- Church of Saint Michael and Saint Fedor
- 51°29′54″N 31°18′34″E
- Location: Hetmana Polubotka St, 40/2 Chernihiv, Chernihiv Oblast 14030
- Country: Ukraine
- Denomination: Eastern Orthodox Church

History
- Status: Chapel

Architecture
- Functional status: Active
- Architectural type: Byzantine Revival architecture
- Years built: 1801
- Completed: 1806

Administration
- Archdiocese: Chernihiv
- Diocese: Chernihiv diocese of the OCU

The Church of Saint Michael and Saint Fedor (Ukrainian: Церква Михаїла і Федора, romanized: Tserkva Mykhaila i Fedora) is an architectural monument of local importance, the only temple in Ukraine consecrated in honor of Prince Michael of Chernigov and his boyar Fedor in Chernihiv.

== History ==
By the decision of the executive committee of the Chernihiv Oblast Council of People's Deputies of Workers dated March 26, 1984, No. 118, the status of a local architectural monument with security No. 13-Chg was assigned the title of the Complex of buildings of the hospital (former theological seminary), which includes the Complex of buildings of the hospital (former theological seminary) with security No. 13/1-Chg and the Church of Michael and Fedor with security number 13/2-Chg.

On November 12, 2015, the Chernihiv Oblast Department of Culture and Tourism, Nationalities and Religions passed resolution No. 254, adopting the name for the monument - the Complex of Buildings of the Chernihiv Theological Seminary.

It has its own "monument territory" (The complex of buildings of the theological seminary, including the seminary itself and the church of Michael and Theodore) and is located in the "complex security zone of monuments of the historical center of the city", according to the rules for building and using the territory. There is an information board at the temple.

== Description ==
The construction of the temple began in 1801 next to the house of Hetman Pavlo Polubotok. But, due to financial difficulties, the construction of the church was completed only in 1806. The consecration of the temple of Michael and Fedor took place in 1808. Since then, the church has been rebuilt several times and changed its appearance accordingly. At first it was built in the style of classicism with baroque elements. In the second half of the 19th century, as a result of reconstruction, the church received a Byzantine appearance.

Stone, plastered, one-domed, three-part (three-frame), cruciform church, with four cuts between the branches of the main volumes. The main cubic domed volume (nave) is adjoined from the east by an apse, rectangular in plan, where the altar is located, and from the west, a babinets (porch) rectangular in plan. The temple is crowned with a dome on an octagonal light drum with eight arch-like windows, which are divided by arcades in the decor. The façade of the main volume of the temple into balustrades, instead of shoulder blades, is divided by pairs of semi-columns, covered by a crowning cornice, and ends with zakomaras. The corners of the auxiliary volumes are accentuated by pairs of semi-columns. The windows are arched, on the main volume above the main windows there are small round windows. During the Soviet period, the temple was closed. The building was returned to the church in the late 1990s. In 2008, a new iconostasis in golden-white colors was created for the temple

== See also ==
- List of Churches and Monasteries in Chernihiv

== Gallery ==
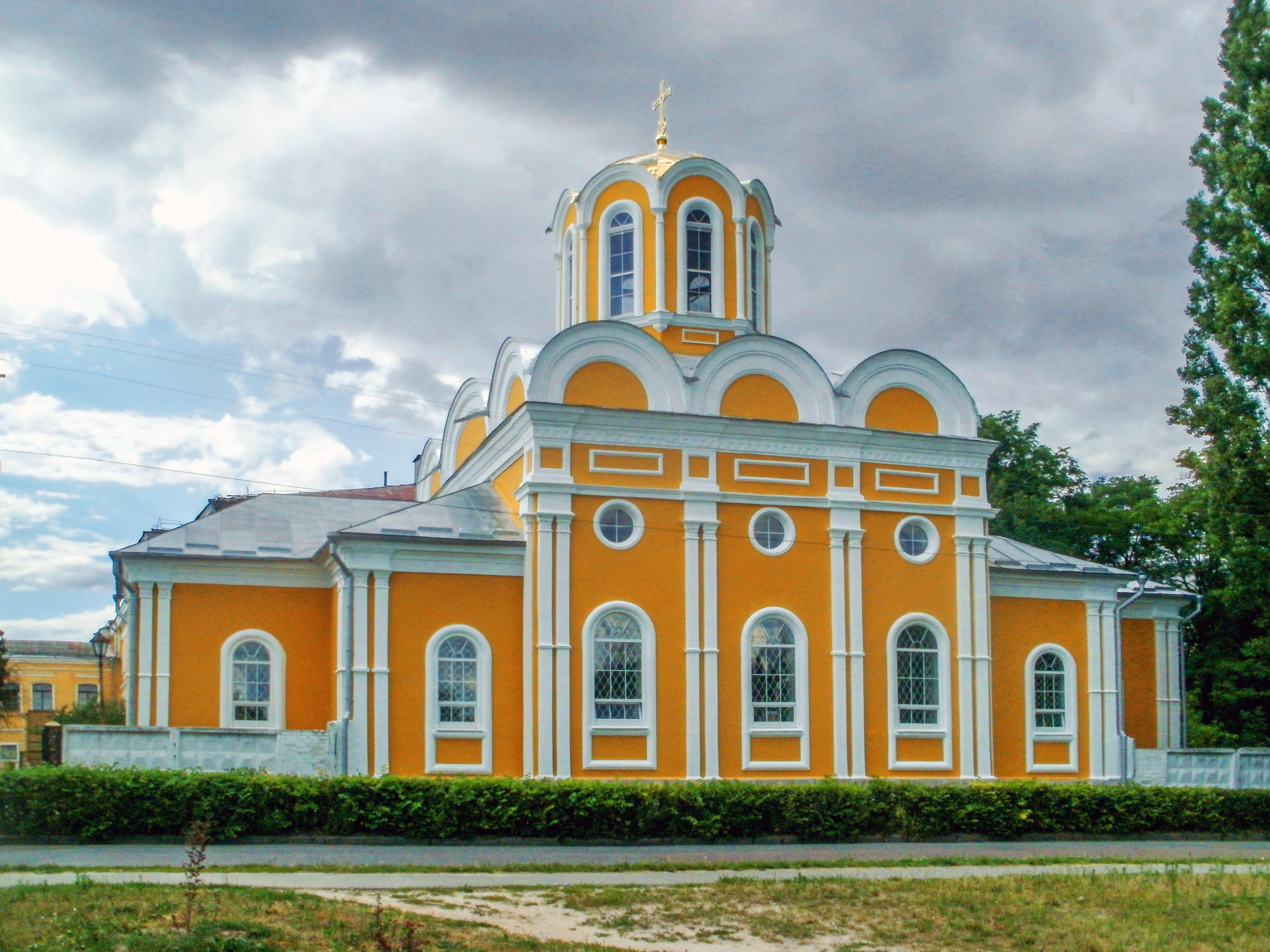

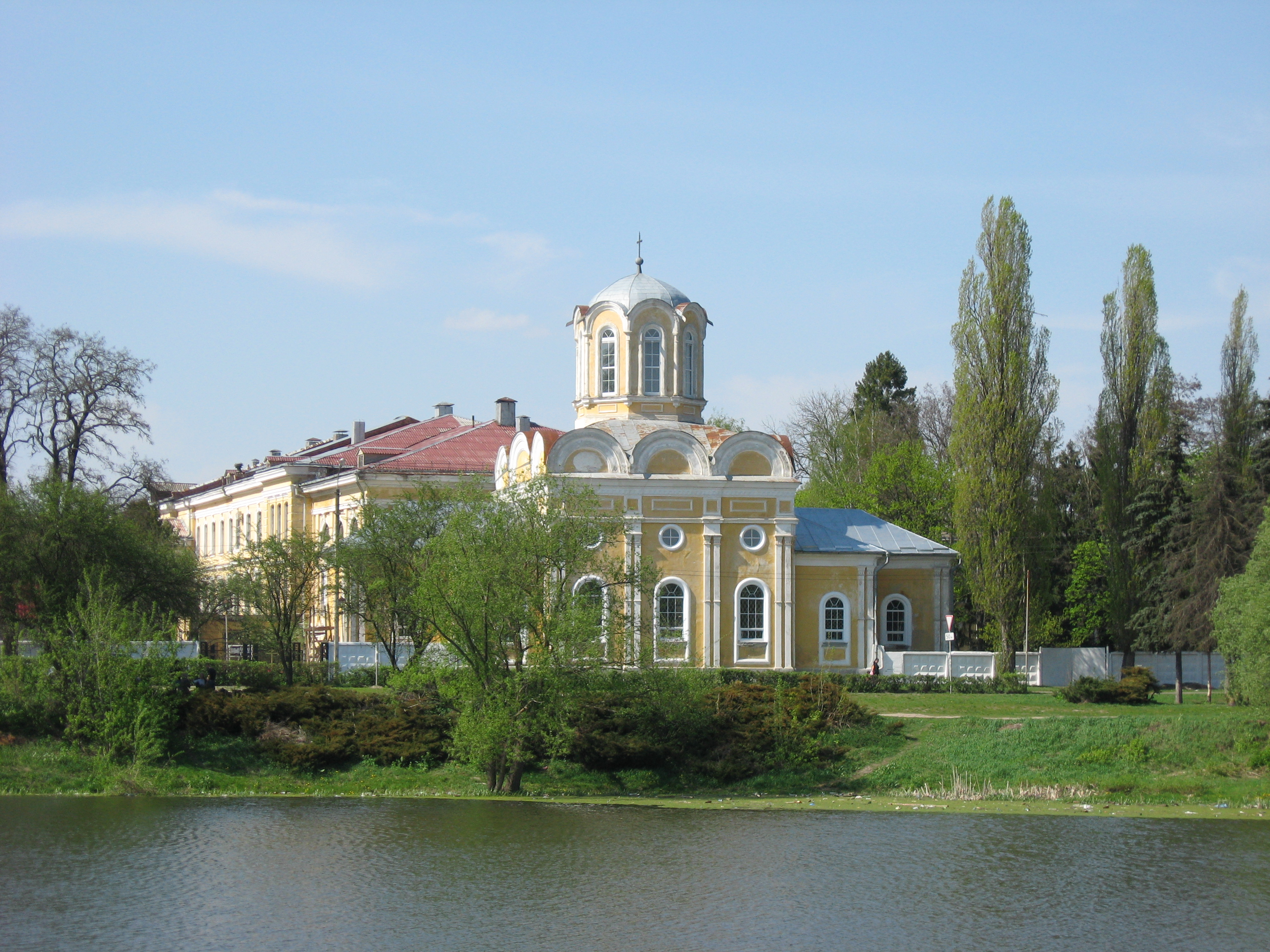
