= List of churches and monasteries in Chernihiv =

The city of Chernihiv, Ukraine, houses a number of churches and monasteries, with the oldest ones dating back to the Kievan Rus' period.

== Churches ==
Picture	Name	Location
	Catherine's Church	Myru Avenue
	Piatnytska Church	Bohdan Khmelnytskyi Garden Square
	Transfiguration Cathedral	Dytynets Park
	Church of the Archangel Michael	Myru Avenue
	Church of All Saints	Vsikhsviatska Street, 1
	Church of Saint Michael and Saint Fedor	Hetmana Polubotka St, 40/2
	Church of the Holy Spirit	Kyivska St, 20
	Church of the Resurrection	Remisnycha St, 46
	Our Lady of Kazan Church	Kotsiubynskoho Street 5
	Holy Trinity Cathedral	Trinity Monastery
	Vvedenska Church	Trinity Monastery
	Lyzohub Burial Church	Yeletskyi Monastery
	Saints Peter and Paul Church	Yeletskyi Monastery
	Church of St. Theodosius	Yatseve Cemetery Church
	Church of St. Nicholas the Wonderworker	Mykhalevycha st. Chernihiv, Ucraina, 14000
	Seventh-day Adventist Church	166A, 1st of May St.
	Bethany Church of the Holy Cross	Nezalezhnosti Street, 11
	Church of the House of the Gospel	Kotsyubyns'koho Street 2
	Church of Anastasia	Promyslova Street 38
	Church of the Nativity of the Blessed Virgin Mary	Vyacheslav Chornovola Street, 45
	Church of the 2000th Anniversary of the Nativity of Christ	Independence Street
	St. Elijah Church	St. Elijah Monastery
	Saints Borys and Hlib Cathedral	Dytynets Park

== Monasteries ==
Chernihiv is famous for its three monasteries: Yeletskyi Monastery, St. Elias Monastery, and Trinity Cathedral Monastery. The monasteries are south of the city center in the area of Boldyni Hory.

Picture	Name	Location
	Trinity Cathedral Monastery	Boldyni Hory
	Yeletskyi Dormition Monastery	via Kniazia Chornoho, 1, Chernihiv
	St. Elias Monastery	Boldyni Hory
